= Index of construction articles =

This page is a list of construction topics.

== A ==
Abated - Abrasive blasting - AC power plugs and sockets - Access mat - Accrington brick - Accropode - Acid brick - Acoustic plaster - Active daylighting - Adaptive reuse - Aerial crane - Aerosol paint - Aggregate base - Agile construction - Akmon - Alternative natural materials - Anchorage in reinforced concrete - Angle grinder - Arc welding - Artificial stone - Asbestos cement - Asbestos insulating board - Asbestos shingle - Asphalt concrete - Asphalt roll roofing - Autoclaved aerated concrete - Autonomous building - Azulejo - Australian Construction Contracts - Axe

== B ==
Backhoe - Balloon framing - Bamboo construction - Bamboo-mud wall - Bandsaw - Banksman - Barrel roof - Baseboard - Basement waterproofing - Batten - Batter board - Belt sander - Bill of quantities - Bioasphalt - Biocidal natural building material - Bituminous waterproofing - Block paving - Blowtorch - Board roof - Bochka roof - Bond beam - Boulder wall - Bowen Construction - Box crib - Breaker - Brettstapel - Brick - Brick clamp - Brick hod - Bricklayer - Brickwork - Bughole - Builder's risk insurance - Builders hardware - Builders' rites - Building - Building automation - Building code - Building construction - Building control body - Building cooperative - Building design - Building diagnostics - Building engineer - Building envelope - Building estimator - Building implosion - Building information modeling - Building information modeling in green building - Building insulation - Building insulation materials - Building-integrated photovoltaics - Building life cycle - Building maintenance unit - Building material - Building officials - Building performance - Building performance simulation - Building regulations approval - Building regulations in the United Kingdom - Building science - Building services engineering - Building typology - Bull's eye level - Bulldozer - Bundwerk - Bush hammer - Butterfly roof

== C ==
Calcium aluminate cements - Camber beam - Carpenter's axe - Carpentry - Cast in place concrete - Cast stone - Caulk - Cavity wall insulation - Cellulose insulation - Cement - Cement board - Cement-bonded wood fiber - Cement clinker - Cement kiln - Cement mill - Cement render - Cement tile - Cementing equipment - Cementitious foam insulation - Cenocell - Central heating - Centring - Ceramic building material - Ceramic tile cutter - Chaska brick - Chief Construction Adviser to UK Government - Chimney - Circular saw - Civil engineer - Civil engineering - Civil estimator - Cladding (construction) - Clerk of the Works - Climate-adaptive building shell - Climbing formwork - Clinker brick - Close studding - Coastal engineering - Coating - Cold-formed steel - Collar beam - Collyweston stone slate - Compactor - Complex Projects Contract - Composite material - Composting toilet - Compressed earth block - Computer-aided design - Concrete - Concrete degradation - Concrete densifier - Concrete finisher - Concrete float - Concrete fracture analysis - Concrete grinder - Concrete hinge - Concrete leveling - Concrete mixer - Concrete masonry unit - Concrete moisture meter - Concrete plant - Concrete pump - Concrete recycling - Concrete saw - Concrete sealer - Concrete ship - Concrete slab - Concrete slump test - Conical roof - Constructability - Constructed wetland - Constructing Excellence - Construction - Construction Alliance - Construction and renovation fires - Construction bidding - Construction buyer - Construction collaboration technology - Construction communication - Construction contract - Construction delay - Construction engineering - Construction equipment theft - Construction estimating software - Construction foreman - Construction industry of India - Construction industry of Iran - Construction industry of Japan - Construction industry of Romania - Construction industry of the United Kingdom - Construction law - Constructionline - Construction loan - Construction management - Construction paper - Construction partnering - Construction Photography - Construction Research and Innovation Strategy Panel - Construction site safety - Construction trailer - Construction waste - Construction worker - Cool pavement - Copper cladding - Cordwood construction - Core-and-veneer - Corn construction - Cornerstone - Corrosion fatigue - Corrugated galvanised iron - Cost engineering - Cost overrun - Cover meter - Crane - Crane vessel - Crawl space - Crawler excavator - Cream City brick - Creep and shrinkage of concrete - Cross bracing - Cross-laminated timber - Custom home - Cutting tool

== D ==
Damp proofing - Deck - Deconstruction - Decorative concrete - Decorative laminate - Decorative stones - Deep foundation - Deep plan - Demolition - Demolition waste - Design–bid–build - Design–build - Detailed engineering - Diagrid - Diamond grinding - Diamond grinding of pavement - Die grinder - Dimensional lumber - Directional boring - Displacement ventilation - Distribution board - Dolos - Domestic roof construction - Double envelope house - Double tee - Dragon beam - Drain (plumbing) - Drainage - Drifter drill - Drill - Drilling and blasting - Driven to refusal - Dropped ceiling - Dry mortar production line - Drywall - Drywall mechanic - Ducrete - Dump truck - Dumper - Duplex - Dutch brick - Dutch gable roof - Dutch roof tiles - Dwang

== E ==
Early skyscrapers - Earthbag construction - Earthquake engineering - Earthquake-resistant structures - Earthquake simulation - Eco-cement - Egyptian pyramid construction techniques - Electrical engineer - Electrical wiring - Electrician - Electric resistance welding - Elemental cost planning - Elevator mechanic - Encasement - Encaustic tile - Endurance time method - Energetically modified cement - Engineering - Engineered cementitious composite - Engineering brick - Engineering, procurement, and construction - Enviroboard - Environmental impact of concrete - Equivalent Concrete Performance Concept - Erosion control - Eternit - Excavator - Expanded clay aggregate - Expanded polystyrene concrete - External render - Exterior insulation finishing system - External wall insulation

== F ==
Falsework - Facade - Facade engineering - Facadism - Facility condition assessment - Fareham red brick - Fast-track construction - Fastener - Faux painting - Fédération Française du Bâtiment - Ferrocement - Fiberboard - Fiber cement siding - Fiberglass - Fiber-reinforced composite - Fiber-reinforced concrete - Fiber roll - Fibre cement - Fibre-reinforced plastic - Filigree concrete - Fill trestle - Fire brick - Fire door - Fire protection (Active fire protection / Passive fire protection) - Fire Protection Engineering - Firestopping - Fireproofing - Fire safety - Fire sprinkler system - First fix and second fix - Flashing - Flat roof - Floating raft system - Floor plan - Flux-cored arc welding - Fly ash brick - Foam concrete - Foam glass - Forge welding - Formstone - Formwork - Foundation - Framer - Framing - Frost damage - Furring

== G ==
Gable roof - Gambrel - Gas metal arc welding - Geofoam - GigaCrete - Girt - Glass brick - Glass fiber reinforced concrete - Glazier - Glazing - Glued laminated timber - Grade beam - Grader - Grating - Green building - Green building and wood - Green building in Germany - Green (certification) - Green roof - Green wall - Groundbreaking - Ground reinforcement - Grout - Grouted roof - Guastavino tile - Gypsum block - Gypsum concrete

== H ==
Hammer - Hammerbeam roof - Hammer drill - Hard hat - Harling - Harvard brick - Heat pump - Heavy equipment - Heavy equipment operator - Hempcrete - Herodotus Machine - Herringbone pattern - High-performance fiber-reinforced cementitious composites - High-rise building - High-visibility clothing - History of construction - History of structural engineering - History of the world's tallest buildings - Heating, ventilation, and air-conditioning - Hoisting - Home construction - Home improvement - Home wiring - Hot-melt adhesive - House - House painter and decorator - House raising - Housewrap - Hurricane-proof building - Hybrid masonry - Hydrodemolition - Hydrophobic concrete - Hypertufa

== I ==
I-beam - I-joist - Iberian paleochristian decorated tile - Illegal construction - Imbrex and tegula - Impact wrench - Imperial roof decoration - Industrialization of construction - Insulated glazing - Insulated siding - Insulating concrete form - Insulation materials - Integrated framing assembly - Integrated project delivery - Interior protection - International Building Code - Ironworker

== J ==
Jackhammer - Jack post - Japanese carpentry - Jettying - Jigsaw - Joinery - Joint - Joint compound - Johnson bar

== K ==
Knee wall - Knockdown texture

== L ==
Laborer - Ladder - Lakhori bricks - Laminate panel - Lath and plaster - Laser level - Launching gantry - Lean construction - Level luffing crane - Lewis (lifting appliance) - Lift slab construction - Lifting equipment - Lighting - Light tower - Lightening holes - Lime mortar - Line of thrust - Live bottom trailer - Living building material - Load-bearing wall - Loader - Log building - London stock brick - Low-energy building techniques - Low-energy house - Low-rise building - Lump sum contract - Lunarcrete - Lustron house

== M ==
Mansard roof - Marbleizing - Masonry - Masonry trowel - Masonry veneer - Mass concrete - Master builder - Material efficiency - Material passport - Mathematical tile - Mechanical connections - Mechanical, electrical, and plumbing - Mechanics lien - Medieval letter tile - Medium-density fibreboard - Megaproject - Megastructure - Metal profiles - Microtunneling - Middle-third rule - Miller Act - Millwork - Millwright - Mobile crane - Modern methods of construction - Modular addition - Modular building - Moiré tell-tale - Moling - Moment-resisting frame - Monocrete construction - Mono-pitched roof - Mortar - Mudbrick - Mudcrete - Multi-tool

== N ==
Nail gun - Nanak Shahi bricks - Nanoconcrete - NEC Engineering and Construction Contract - New Austrian tunnelling method - New-construction building commissioning - Nibbler - Non-shrink grout

== O ==
Occupancy - Offshore construction - Off-site construction - Operational bill - Opus africanum - Opus albarium - Opus craticum - Opus gallicum - Opus incertum - Opus isodomum - Opus latericium - Opus mixtum - Opus quadratum - Opus reticulatum - Opus spicatum - Opus vittatum - Oriented strand board - Oxy-fuel welding and cutting

== P ==
Painter and decorator - Painterwork - Panelling - Pantile - Papercrete - Parge coat - Particle board - Passive daylighting - Passive house - Passive survivability - Pavement - Pavement engineering - Pavement milling - Paver base - Penetrant (mechanical, electrical, or structural) - Performance bond - Permeable paving - Pierrotage - Pile cap - Pile driver - Pile splice - Pipefitter - Pipelayer - Planetary surface construction - Plank (wood) - Planning permission - Planning permission in the United Kingdom - Plasma arc welding - Plasterer - Plasterwork - Plastic lumber - Plot plan - Plug and feather - Plumb bob - Plumber - Plumbing - Plumbing drawing - Pneumatic tool - Pole building framing - Polished concrete - Polychrome brickwork - Polymer concrete - Porch collapse - Portable building - Portland cement - Portland stone - Portuguese pavement - Post in ground - Poteaux-sur-sol - Powder coating - Power concrete screed - Power shovel - Power tool - Power trowel - Precast concrete - Pre-construction services - Pre-engineered building - Prefabricated building - Prefabrication - Prestressed concrete - Prestressed structure - Primer (paint) - Project agreement (Canada) - Project delivery method - Project management - Properties of concrete - Punch list - Purlin

== Q ==
Quadruple glazing - Quantity surveyor - Quantity take-off - Quarry tile - Quarter minus

== R ==
R-value (insulation) - Radial arm saw - Radiant barrier - Radiator reflector - Rafter - Rainscreen - Raised floor - RAL colour standard - RAL colors - Rammed earth - Random orbital sander - Rapid construction - Ready-mix concrete - Real estate - Rebar - Rebar detailing - Rebar spacer - Reciprocal frame - Reciprocating saw - Red List building materials - Red rosin paper - Redevelopment - Reed mat (plastering) - Reema construction - Reglet - Reinforced concrete - Reinforced concrete structures durability - Relocatable buildings - Repointing - Resilience (engineering and construction) - Retentions in the British construction industry - Rice-hull bagwall construction - Rigger - Rigid panel - Ring crane - Rivet gun - Road - Road surface - Roller-compacted concrete - Roman cement - Roof - Roof coating - Roof edge protection - Roofer - Roof shingle - Roof tiles - Room air distribution - Rosendale cement - Rotary hammer - Roughcast - Rubberized asphalt - Rubble - Rubble trench foundation - Rubblization - Ruin value

== S ==
Saddle roof - Salt-concrete - Saltillo tile - Sander - Sandhog - Sandjacking - Sandwich panel - Sarking - Saw-tooth roof - Sawyer - Scabbling - Scaffolding - Schmidt hammer - Screed - Screw piles - Scrim and sarking - Sediment control - Segregation in concrete - Self-build - Self-cleaning floor - Self-consolidating concrete - Self-framing metal buildings - Self-leveling concrete - Septic tank - Serviceability - Sett - Settlement (structural) - Sewage treatment - Shallow foundation - Shear - Shear wall - Sheet metal - Shelf angle - Shielded metal arc welding - Shiplap - Shop drawing - Shoring - Shotcrete - Shovel - Shovel ready - Sick building syndrome - Siding - Sill plate - Site survey - Skyscraper - Skyscraper design and construction - Slate industry in Wales - Slater - Sledgehammer - Slipform stonemasonry - Slip forming - Smalley - Snecked masonry - Soft story building - Soil cement - Solid ground floor - Sorel cement - Spackling paste - Spirit level - Split-level home - Spray painting - Stack effect - Staff - Staffordshire blue brick - Staggered truss system - Staircase jig - Stair tread - Stairs - Stamped asphalt - Stamped concrete - Steam shovel - Steeplejack - Sticky rice mortar - Stonemason's hammer - Storey pole - Storm drain - Storm window - Steel building - Steel fixer - Steel frame - Steel plate construction - Stone carving - Stone sealer - Stone veneer - Storey - Strand jack - Strap footing - Straw-bale construction - Strength of materials - Strongback - Structural building components - Structural channel - Structural clay tile - Structural drawing - Structural engineering - Structural insulated panel - Structural integrity and failure - Structural material - Structural robustness - Structural steel - Structure relocation - Strut channel - Stucco - Submerged arc welding - Submittals - Subsidence - Substructure - Suction excavator - Suicide bidding - Sulfur concrete - Superadobe - Superinsulation - Superintendent - Surfaced block - Survey stakes - Sustainability in construction - Sustainable flooring - Sustainable refurbishment

== T ==
T-beam - Tabby concrete - Table saw - Tar paper - Teardown - Telescopic handler - Temperley transporter - Temporary fencing - Tented roof - Terraced house - Tetrapod - Textile-reinforced concrete - Thatching - Thermal bridge - Thermal insulation - Thinset - Thin-shell structure - Three-decker - Tie - Tie down hardware - Tile - Tilt slab - Tilt up - Timber - Timber framing - Timber framing tools - Timber pilings - Timber recycling - Timber roof truss - Tin ceiling - Tiocem - Toe board - Topping out - Townhouse - Tracked loader - Traditional Korean roof construction - Transite - Treadwheel crane - Trench shield - Trencher - Trenchless technology - Truss - Tube and clamp scaffold - Tuckpointing - Tunnel boring machine - Tunnel construction - Tunnel hole-through - Tunnel rock recycling - Twig work - Types of concrete

== U ==
Umarell - Uncertainties in building design and building energy assessment - Underfloor air distribution - Underground construction - Underpinning - Unfinished building - Uniclass - Uniformat

== V ==
Verify in field - Vertical damp proof barrier - Vibro stone column - Vinyl composition tile - Vinyl siding - Virtual design and construction - Vitrified tile - Voided biaxial slab - Volumetric concrete mixer

== W ==
Waffle slab - Walking excavator - Wall - Wall chaser - Wall footing - Wall plan - Wall stud - Water–cement ratio - Water heating - Water level - Waterproofing - Wattle and daub - Wearing course - Weathering steel - Weatherization - Weld access hole - Welded wire mesh - Welder - Welding - Welding power supply - Wheel tractor-scraper - White Card - Window capping - Window insulation film - Window well cover - Wiring closet - Wood-plastic composite - Wood shingle - Wool insulation - Wrecking ball - Wrought iron

== X ==
Xbloc

== Z ==
Zellij - Zero-energy building - Zome

== See also ==
- Outline of construction
- Glossary of British bricklaying
- Glossary of construction cost estimating
- List of building materials
- List of building types
- List of buildings
- List of construction methods
- List of construction trades
- List of roof shapes
