= Lime (material) =

Calcium oxides and/or hydroxides

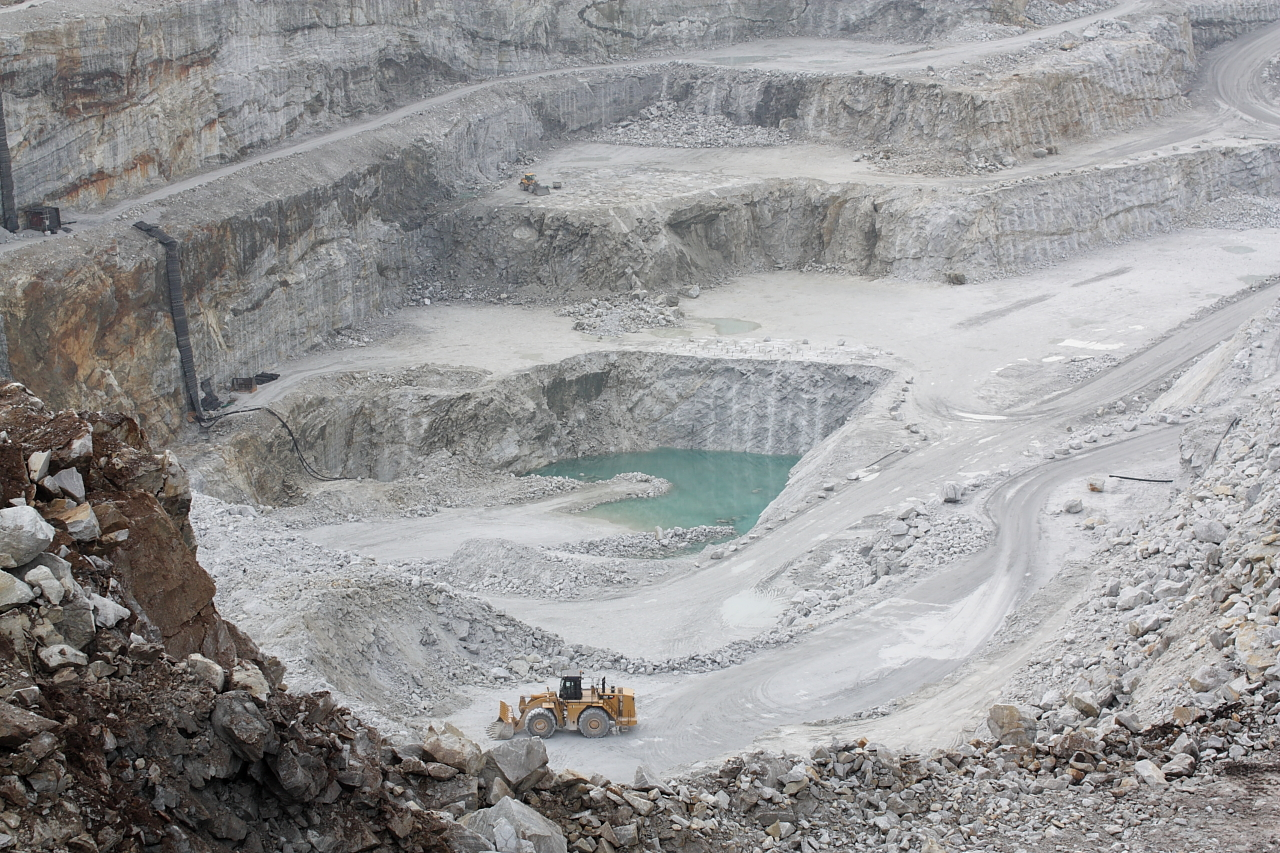
Limestone quarry in Brønnøy Municipality, Norway

Lime is an inorganic material composed primarily of calcium oxides and hydroxides. It is also the name for calcium oxide which is used as an industrial mineral and is made by heating calcium carbonate in a kiln. Calcium oxide can occur as a product of coal-seam fires and in altered limestone xenoliths in volcanic ejecta. The International Mineralogical Association recognizes lime as a mineral with the chemical formula of CaO. The word lime originates with its earliest use as building mortar and has the sense of sticking or adhering.

These materials are still used in large quantities in the manufacture of steel and as building and engineering materials (including limestone products, cement, concrete, and mortar), as chemical feedstocks, for sugar refining, and other uses. Lime industries and the use of many of the resulting products date from prehistoric times in both the Old World and the New World. Lime is used extensively for wastewater treatment with ferrous sulfate.

The rocks and minerals from which these materials are derived, typically limestone or chalk, are composed primarily of calcium carbonate. They may be cut, crushed, or pulverized and chemically altered. Burning (calcination) of calcium carbonate in a lime kiln above 900 °C (1,650 °F) converts it into the highly caustic and reactive material burnt lime, unslaked lime or quicklime (calcium oxide) and, through subsequent addition of water, into the less caustic (but still strongly alkaline) slaked lime or hydrated lime (calcium hydroxide, Ca(OH)_{2}), the process of which is called slaking of lime.

When the term lime is encountered in an agricultural context, it usually refers to agricultural lime (crushed limestone), not a product of a lime kiln. Otherwise it most commonly means slaked lime. The more reactive form is described more specifically as quicklime or burnt lime.

== Production ==
Lime production

In the lime industry, limestone is a general term for rocks that contain 80% or more of calcium or magnesium carbonate, including marble, chalk, oolite, and marl. Further classification is done by composition as high calcium, argillaceous (clayey), silicious, conglomerate, magnesian, dolomite, and other limestones. Uncommon sources of lime include coral, sea shells, calcite and ankerite.

Limestone is extracted from quarries or mines. Part of the extracted stone, selected according to its chemical composition and optical granulometry, is calcinated at about 900 °C (1,650 °F) in lime kilns to produce quicklime according to the reaction:

$$\ce{\overset{calcium~carbonate}{CaCO3} ->[][\text{heat}] \overset{calcium~oxide}{CaO} + \overset{carbon~dioxide}{CO2}}$$

Before use, quicklime is hydrated (combined with water, slaking). Hydrated lime is also known as slaked lime, and is produced according to the reaction:

$$\ce{{CaO} + \overset{water}{H2O} -> \overset{calcium~hydroxide}{Ca(OH)2}}$$

Dry slaking is slaking quicklime with just enough water to hydrate the quicklime, but to keep it as a powder; it is referred to as hydrated lime. In wet slaking, a slight excess of water is added to hydrate the quicklime to a form referred to as lime putty.

Lime is commonly used as a binding mortar in masonry due to its adhesive properties with bricks and stones. It is also used in whitewashing as a wall-coat to allow the whitewash to adhere the wall.

== Cycle ==
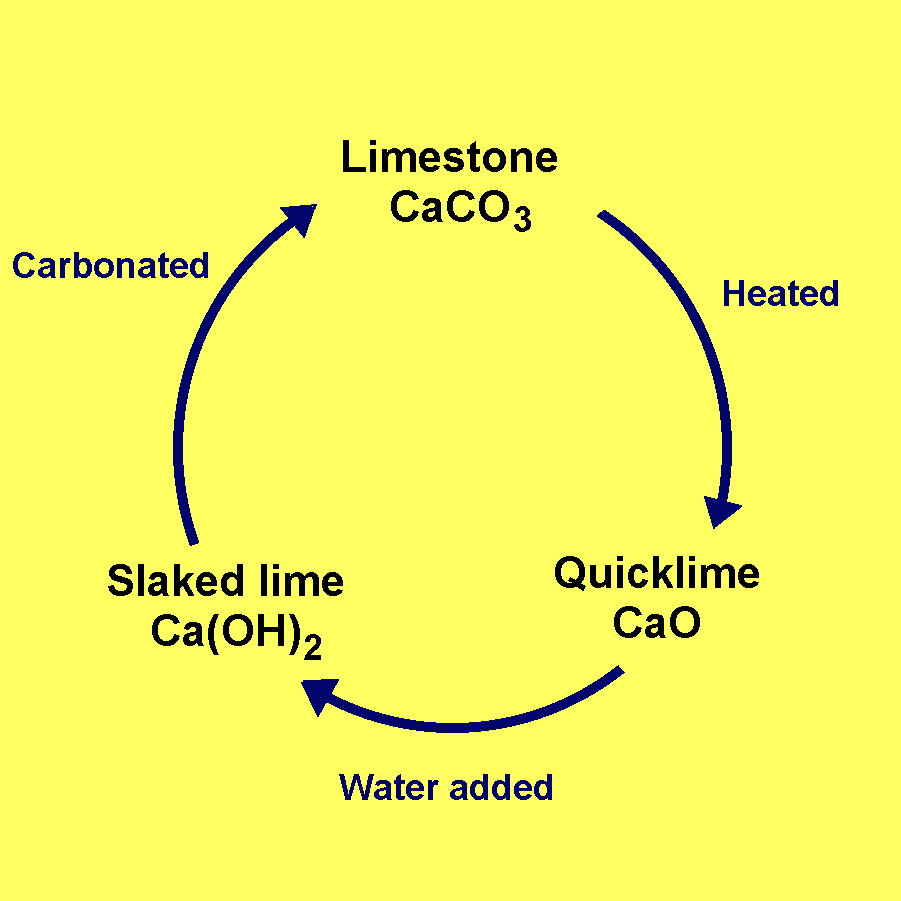
The lime cycle for high-calcium lime

The process by which limestone (calcium carbonate) is converted to quicklime by heating, then to slaked lime by hydration, and naturally reverts to calcium carbonate by carbonation is called the lime cycle. The conditions and compounds present during each step of the lime cycle have a strong influence of the end product, thus the complex and varied physical nature of lime products.

An example is when slaked lime (calcium hydroxide) is mixed into a thick slurry with sand and water to form mortar for building purposes. When the masonry has been laid, the slaked lime in the mortar slowly begins to react with carbon dioxide to form calcium carbonate (limestone) according to the reaction:

Ca(OH)_{2} + CO_{2} → CaCO_{3} + H_{2}O.

The carbon dioxide that takes part in this reaction is principally available in the air or dissolved in rainwater so pure lime mortar will not recarbonate under water or inside a thick masonry wall.

The lime cycle for dolomitic and magnesium lime is not well understood and more complex because the magnesium compounds also slake to periclase which slake more slowly than calcium oxide and when hydrated produce several other compounds. Thus, these limes contain inclusions of portlandite, brucite, magnesite, and other magnesium hydroxycarbonate compounds. These magnesium compounds have very limited, contradictory research which questions whether they "...may be significantly reactive with acid rain, which could lead to the formation of magnesium sulfate salts." Magnesium sulfate salts may damage the mortar when they dry and recrystallize due to expansion of the crystals as they form, which is known as sulfate attack.

== Building materials ==
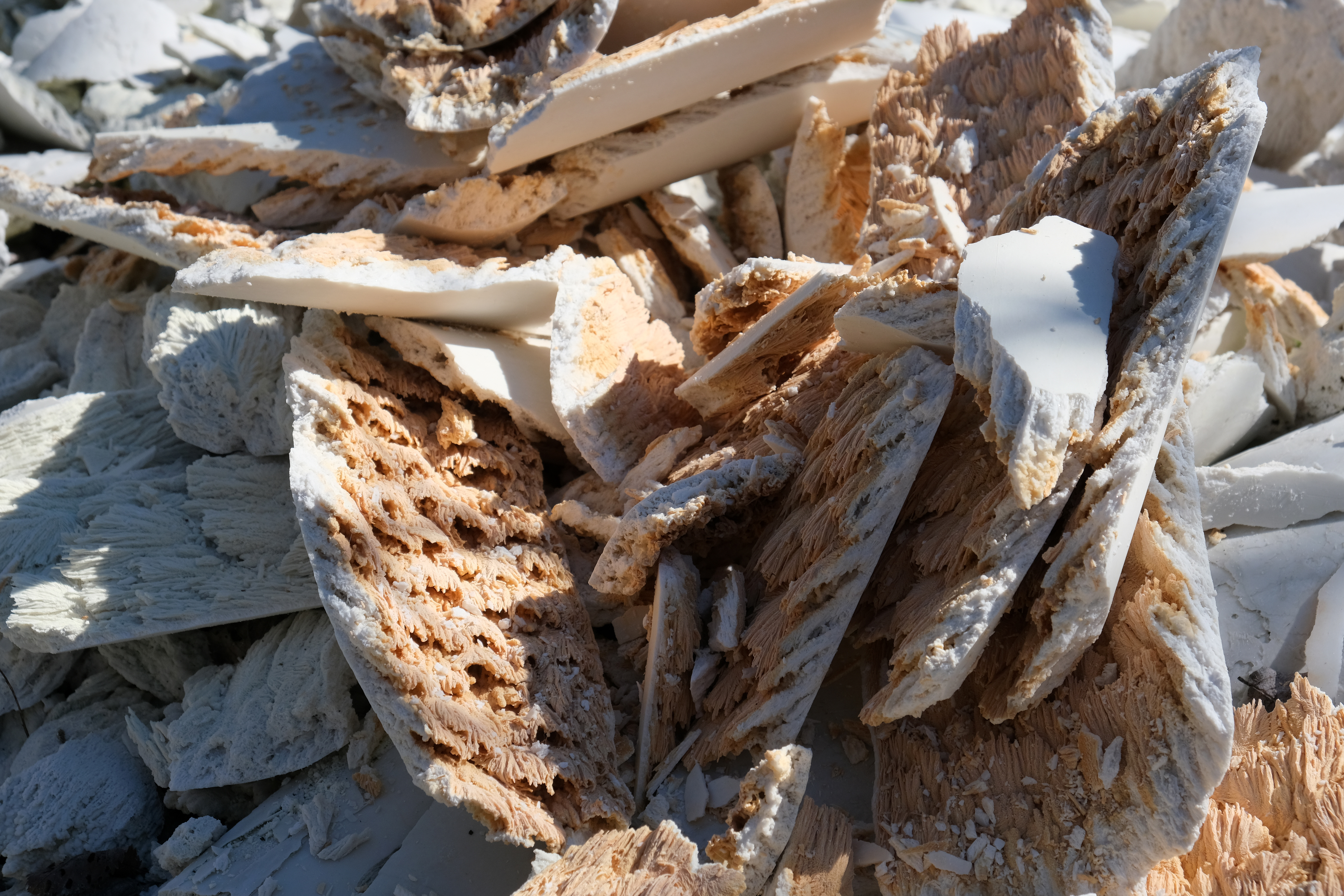
Lime formed to piping bringing thermal water to Katlanovo spa, North Macedonia.

Lime used in building materials is broadly classified as "pure", "hydraulic", and "poor" lime; can be natural or artificial; and may be further identified by its magnesium content such as dolomitic or magnesium lime. Uses include lime mortar, lime plaster, lime render, lime-ash floors, tabby concrete, whitewash, silicate mineral paint, and limestone blocks which may be of many types. The qualities of the many types of processed lime affect how they are used. The Romans used two types of lime mortar to make Roman concrete, which allowed them to revolutionize architecture, sometimes called the Concrete revolution.

Lime has many complex qualities as a building product including workability which includes cohesion, adhesion, air content, water content, crystal shape, board-life, spreadability, and flowability; bond strength; comprehensive strength; setting time; sand-carrying capacity; hydraulicity; free lime content; vapor permeability; flexibility; and resistance to sulfates. These qualities are affected by many factors during each step of manufacturing and installation, including the original ingredients of the source of lime; added ingredients before and during firing including inclusion of compounds from the fuel exhaust; firing temperature and duration; method of slaking including a hot mix (quicklime added to sand and water to make mortar), dry slaking and wet slaking; ratio of the mixture with aggregates and water; the sizes and types of aggregate; contaminants in the mixing water; workmanship; and rate of drying during curing.

Pure lime is also known as rich, common, air, slaked, slack, pickling, hydrated, and high calcium lime. It consists primarily of calcium hydroxide which is derived by slaking quicklime (calcium oxide), and may contain up to 5% of other ingredients. Pure lime sets very slowly through contact with carbon dioxide in the air and moisture; it is not a hydraulic lime so it will not set under water. Pure lime is pure white and can be used for whitewash, plaster, and mortar. Pure lime is soluble in water containing carbonic acid, a natural, weak acid which is a solution of carbon dioxide in water and acid rain so it will slowly wash away, but this characteristic also produces autogenous or self-healing process where the dissolved lime can flow into cracks in the material and be redeposited, automatically repairing the crack.

Semi-hydraulic lime, also called partially hydraulic and grey lime, sets initially with water and then continues to set with air. This lime is similar to hydraulic lime but has less soluble silica (usually minimum 6%) and aluminates, and will set under water but will never harden.

Hydraulic lime is also called water lime. Hydraulic lime contains lime with silica or alumina and sets with exposure to water and can set under water. Natural hydraulic lime (NHL) is made from a limestone which naturally contains some clay. Artificial hydraulic lime is made by adding forms of silica or alumina such as clay to the limestone during firing, or by adding a pozzolana to pure lime. Hydraulic limes are classified by their strength: feebly, moderately and eminently hydraulic lime. Feebly hydraulic lime contains 5-10% clay, slakes in minutes, and sets in about three weeks. It is used for less expensive work and in mild climates. Moderately hydraulic lime contains 11-20% clay, slakes in one to two hours, and sets in approximately one week. It is used for better quality work and exterior walls in freezing climates. Eminently hydraulic lime contains 21-30% clay, slakes very slowly, and sets in approximately a day. It is used in harsh environments such as damp locations and near saltwater. Hydraulic lime is off-white in color. "The degree of hydraulicity of mortars will affect many characteristics. By selecting an appropriate ratio of clay to limestone mortars that carbonate or set hydraulically to varying extents can be designed for particular application requirements such as setting time, strength, colour, durability, frost resistance, workability, speed of set in the presence of water, vapour permeability etc."

Poor lime is also known as lean or meager lime. Poor lime sets and cures very slowly and has weak bonding. Poor lime is grey in color.

Magnesium lime contains more than 5% magnesium oxide (BS 6100) or 5-35% magnesium carbonate (ASTM C 59-91). Dolomitic lime has a high magnesium content of 35-46% magnesium carbonate (ASTM C 59-91). Dolomitic lime is named for the Dolomite Mountains in the Italian and Austrian Alps.

In the United States the most commonly used masonry lime is Type S hydrated lime which is intended to be added to Portland cement to improve plasticity, water retention and other qualities. The S in type S stands for special which distinguishes it from Type N hydrated lime where the N stands for normal. The special attributes of Type S are its "...ability to develop high, early plasticity and higher water retentivity and by a limitation on its unhydrated oxide content." The term Type S originated in 1946 in ASTM C 207 Hydrated Lime for Masonry Purposes. Type S lime is almost always dolomitic lime, hydrated under heat and pressure in an autoclave, and used in mortar, render, stucco, and plaster. Type S lime is not considered reliable as a pure binder in mortar due to high burning temperatures during production.

Kankar lime, a lime made from kankar which is a form of calcium carbonate.

Selenitic lime, also known as Scotts' cement after Henry Young Darracott Scott, is a cement of grey chalk or similar lime, such as in the Lias Group, with about 5% added gypsum plaster (calcined gypsum). Selenite is a type of gypsum, but selenitic cement may be made using any form of sulfate or sulfuric acid. Sulfate arrests slaking, causes the cement to set quickly and stronger.

=== Roman concrete ===
The Romans made concrete by mixing lime and volcanic ash to create a pozzolanic reaction. When this was mixed with volcanic tuff and placed under seawater, the seawater hydrated the lime in an exothermic reaction that solidified the mixture.

== See also ==
- Agricultural lime and liming (soil)
- Calcisol (soil type)
- Eco-cement
- Hide glue
- Limelight
- Lime mortar
- Lime softening (water treatment)
- Limewater
- Liming (leather processing)
- Plasterwork
- Sascab: a building and paving material (Central America)
- Soda–lime glass
- Nixtamalization: a food processing method (Mexico)
