= Moisture meter =

Instrument used to measure moisture content

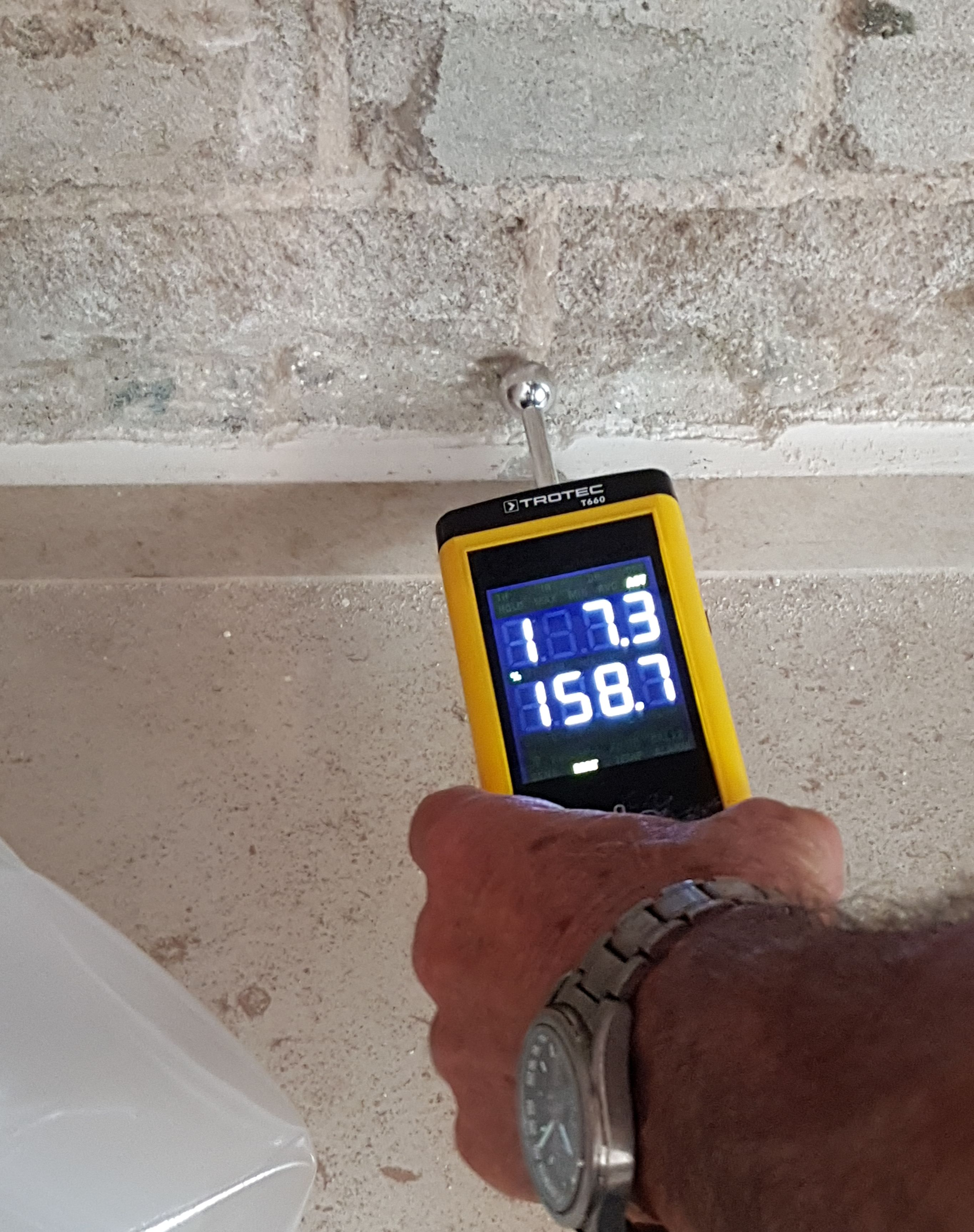
Measuring water leakage in exterior wall with Trotec T660 Moisture Measuring Device, using dielectric measurement method (indicative).

Moisture meters are measuring instruments used to measure the percentage of water in a given substance, as physical properties are strongly affected by moisture content and high moisture content for a period of time may progressively degrade a material. Meters exist for various substances, including wood, building materials, concrete, and soil.

Direct gravimetric measurement of free moisture requires removing, drying, and weighing of a sample, so moisture sensors measure the volumetric water content indirectly by using some other property of the substrate, such as electrical resistance or dielectric constant.

Moisture content can be used to determine if the material is ready for use, unexpectedly wet or dry, or otherwise in need of further inspection. Wood and paper products are very sensitive to their moisture content. Physical properties are strongly affected by moisture content and high moisture content for a period of time may progressively degrade a material.

== Meters by measuring substance ==
=== Wood ===
Newly-cut logs can have a moisture content (MC) of 80% or more, depending on species. Since wood shrinks, and can also split, twist or otherwise change shape as it dries, most wood is dried before being used. This is most often done using a kiln, but may use the air drying method, which is much slower. In most parts of the United States, the minimum moisture content that can be generally obtained in air drying is about 12 to 15 percent. Most air-dried material is usually closer to 20 percent moisture content when used.

In-kiln drying is usually monitored by some type of moisture meter. Moisture meters are used to measure the amount of water in the wood so that the woodworker can determine if it is suitable for the intended purpose. Building inspectors and many more, carpenters, hobbyists, and other woodworkers often are required to have moisture meters. Wood flooring installers, for example, have to verify that the MC of the wood matches the relative humidity in the air of the building. If this step is skipped, a vast array of problems may present itself: cracking, cupping, crowning, buckling, sunken joints, and cracked finishes.

The problems caused by varying degrees of moisture content in wood go beyond simple shrinkage in the dimensions of wood parts. Problems with distortions in the shape of the wood, such as twisting, warping and cupping, occur because of the difference in the degree of dimensional change in wood cells tangentially (perpendicular to the grain and parallel to the growth rings) versus radially (perpendicular to the growth rings).

A moisture meter gives a reading of the approximate moisture content of wood. The reading helps in determining whether the wood is suitably dry for its intended purpose. The moisture content reading can also assist in planning a project design that will accommodate future changes in dimension caused by changes in relative humidity. The amount of overall shrinkage lumber will undergo in the drying process varies from wood species to wood species. The difference between radial and tangential shrinkage also varies from species to species. Woods with a low ratio of tangential to radial shrinkage, such as teak and mahogany, are less prone to distortion due to changes in moisture content than woods with a high ratio, such as eastern white pine and certain species of oak. Species with both low overall shrinkage and a low tangential/radial shrinkage ratio are more stable and will react better to changes in moisture content.

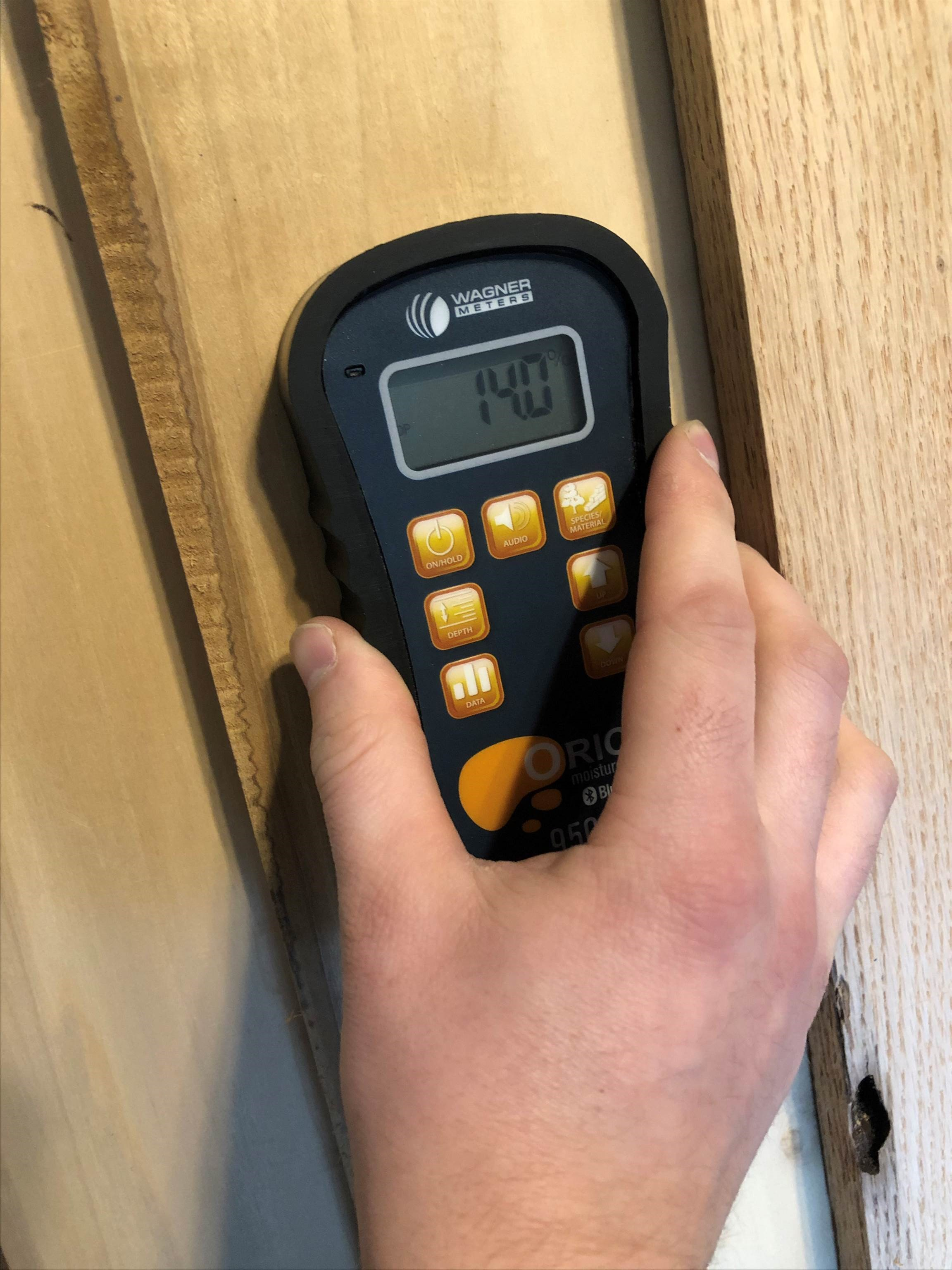
Taking a quantitative reading with a Wagner Meters Orion 950 wood moisture meter.

For wood that is to be used in making furniture, for wood floors, in construction or for any building project, the ideal state is one of equilibrium moisture content (EMC). EMC means that the wood is in balance with the relative humidity it surrounding environment, and is therefore neither gaining or losing in moisture content. In reality, however, it is extremely rare for an environment to maintain a constant fixed relative humidity, and some degree of dimensional change along with seasonal changes in relative humidity is to be expected.

==== Electrical resistance ====
For typical woodworking operations, two basic types of moisture meters are available. Depending in the brand, pin-type meters measure the electrical resistance, termed resistivity, or its reciprocal, conductance, of the wood substrate. Water freely conducts electricity; consequently, increasing water content correlates to increased conductance. Pin-type meters incorporate two pin electrodes which are driven into the wood fibers and directly measure electrical resistance or conductivity. Each brand of moisture meter utilizes proprietary calculations and displays the final moisture content as a percentage.

==== Dielectric ====
The second type of moisture meter relies on the dielectric properties of wood. The meter incorporates two pads which serve as rubber electrodes that transmit and receive a signal when pressed into the wood substrate. The pad type moisture meter is non-invasive in nature and requires only surface contact with the wood to obtain a reading. The non-invasive meter creates a low-frequency electrical wave between the two pads and measures the electrical properties of the wood, similar to the invasive pin-type meter.

=== Building materials ===
Moisture meters may also be utilized by building-industry professionals and water damage restoration consultants to ascertain precise moisture content of a wide range of materials found in the built environment, such as gypsum board drywall or interior finish plaster. Locating high moisture within buildings is essential in locating leaks that may not be visible to the eye. Moisture content is measured in the same manner as wood and displayed in Wood Moisture Equivalent, or WME. WME is the theoretical moisture content that the substrate would contain if it were wood. This ability to locate and measure moisture anomalies can help manage and control indoor air quality by locating and preventing hidden mold growth within buildings.

== See also ==
- Humidity indicator
- Wetness indicator
- Moisture analysis
