= Equivalent Concrete Performance Concept =

According to the Equivalent Concrete Performance Concept a concrete composition, deviating from the EN 206-1, can still be accepted, provided that certain conditions are fulfilled.

== Conditions ==
A concrete composition not composed by the standard EN 206–1, can be acknowledged, only if the new concrete shows a performance equal to the standardized concrete concerning environmental classes. Cement content and water-cement ratio are important elements hereby. The comparison with standardized concrete is tested according to the following properties:

- Compressive strength
- Resistance to carbonatation
- Chloride migration
- Freeze-thaw resistance
- Other possible requirements

When the new concrete scores equally or better, a certificate of utilization can be obtained from certificating organizations.

== Standardization ==
The valid standards concerning concrete are:

- EN 206-1: determines minimum requirements of concrete composition for different environmental classes.
- NBN B15-100: Belgian annex
- CUR recommendation 48: Dutch annex

These national annexes serve to elaborate the functional description of the Equivalent Concrete Performance Concept.

== Concrete composition ==
Standardized concrete is a highly durable material, predominantly thanks to the increasing amount of cement at stricter environmental classes. But cement is a costly component and has a relatively powerful impact on the environment.
Partly because of this, alternative binders such as fly ashes and slags are applied in the concrete sector. As a result, the content of Portland cement can be reduced in many cases. Other recycled raw materials can also contribute to a more economic or less environmental polluting concrete composition.
1. Usage of residual products from the concrete industry, for example stone dust (from crushing aggregates), concrete slurry (from washing mixers) or concrete waste
2. Usage of residual products from other industries, for example fly ash from coal plants and slags from the metallurgical industry
3. Usage of new types of cement with reduced environmental impact (mineralized cement, limestone addition, waste-derived fuels)

== Durability ==
To respect the Kyoto Protocol, the CO_{2}-emission should be reduced. Green concrete exists out of recycling or is composed is such a manner, that it is as environmental-friendly as possible. A few conditions before the term green concrete may be used:

- CO_{2}-emission by concrete manufacturing is reduced by 30%
- Concrete contains at least 20% residual products, used as aggregates
- New residual products, previously disposed of, are used in concrete production
- CO_{2}-neutral: waste-derived fuels replace at least 10% of the fossile fuels in cement production
