= Batter board =

Batter boards (or battle boards, Sometimes mispronounced as "battle/butter boards") are temporary frames, set beyond the corners of a planned foundation at precise elevations. These batter boards are then used to hold layout lines (construction twine) to indicate the limits (edges and corners) of the foundation.

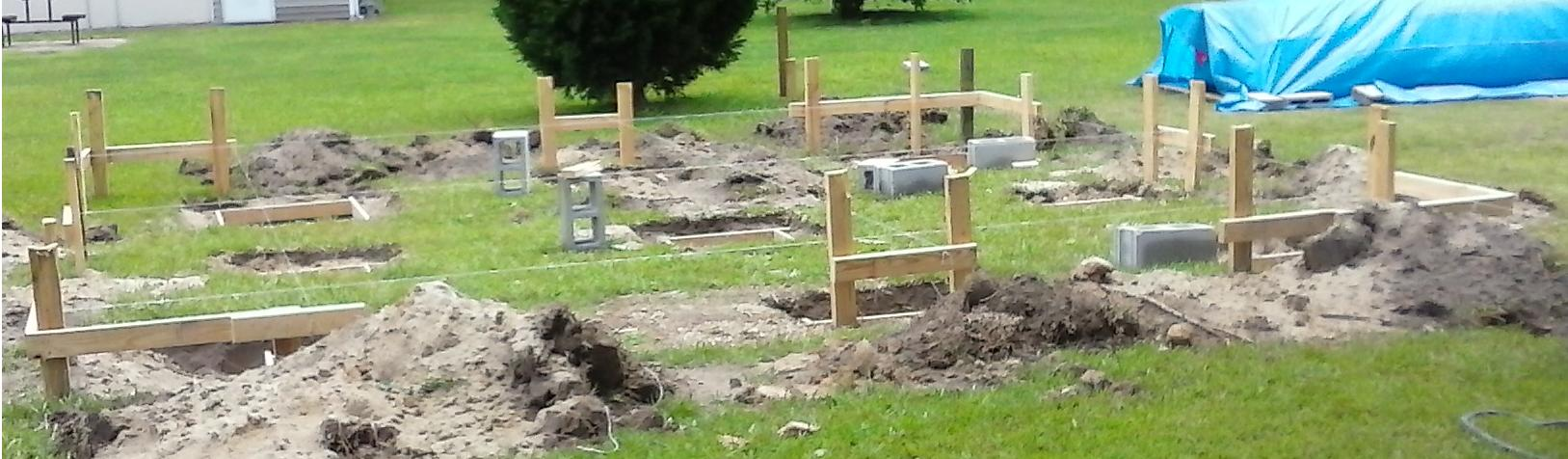
Batter Boards for a 16' x 16' foundation

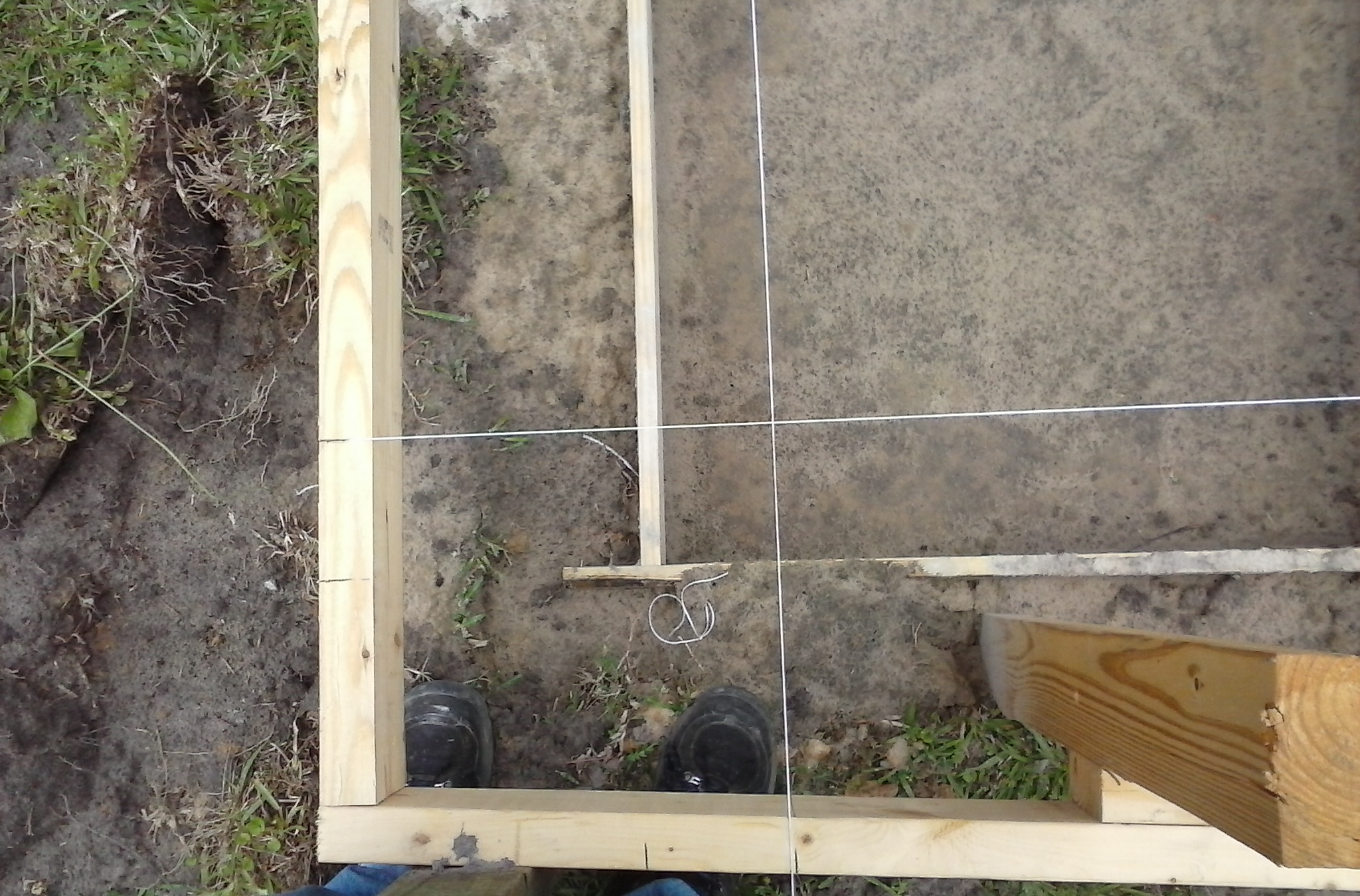
View of crossed strings at batter boards. indicating corner of foundation.
