= Rebar detailing =

Rebar detailing is the discipline of preparing 'shop/placing' or 'fabrication' drawings or shop drawings of steel reinforcement for construction.

Engineers prepare 'design drawings' that develop required strengths by applying rebar size, spacing, location, anchoring details and lap and/or splicing of steel. The depth of concrete cover is also standard part of rebar detail drawing.

By contrast, 'shop/placing drawings' or 'fabrication drawings' apply the intent of the 'design drawings' for the ironworker. These designs specify the quantity, description, placement, bending shapes with dimensions and laps of the reinforcing steel. Various applications are used to produce bar bending schedules which can be directly fed into CNC machines that cut and bend the rebar to the desired shapes.

The fabrication of the bars is scheduled and the placing/fixing sequence indicated, adding the elements required to support those bars during construction.

'Shop/placing drawings' are submitted to the engineer for review of compliance with design drawings before construction can proceed. These drawings must be detailed using the ACI & CRSI Specifications (United States), ACI & RSIC Specifications (Canada), or BS Specifications (United Kingdom).

Rebar detailing is usually assigned to in-house rebar fabricators or rebar detailing companies. The great majority of rebar detailing companies are stationed in The Middle East and India. The salary of a rebar detailer in the United States ranges from $45,000 to $75,000, but outsourcing is common due to substantially lower wages overseas.
