= Construction industry in Romania =

Construction activity (about 10% of GDP) has increased due to recent tax incentives. Romania has become an increasingly popular choice for British property investors, according to recent research from Currencies Direct. The latest Global Emerging Markets Index from the foreign exchange company shows that Romania has made the top ten for the first time, reaching number nine. The monthly index is based on the number of foreign exchange transfers undertaken by the firm to emerging market regions for property purchases. According to Currencies Direct, Romania has seen significant increases in house prices in recent years and its interest rate has dropped from a level of 154 per cent in 1997 to 8.9 per cent in 2005.

The construction industry in Romania contributed an estimated 5.95% in 2006 to the country's gross domestic product (GDP). Business Monitor International released Romania Infrastructure Report Q2 2007 in which they forecast an average industry growth rate of 6.84% over the 2007-2011 period.

The construction industry has been receiving funds from foreign institutions including European Bank for Reconstruction and Development (EBRD) and European Investment Bank (EIB). Furthermore, the Romanian Ministry of Environment and Water Management is making efforts to align the Romanian environment standards with the European standards. One of the ongoing projects in the country is the construction work on the various sections of the Bucharest-Brasov motorway. An increasing number of foreign companies are showing interest in electrical production capacities in the country. Companies include Germany's Siemens, U.S-based AES Corporation and Geneva-based Societe Bancaire Private.

However, the construction industry is subject to a number of risks, which can affect its growth. The rising budgetary deficit, for example, has had an increasingly adverse impact on the availability of funds for the infrastructure sector.

Despite the drawbacks, BMI ranked Romania 12th out of the 13 states included from the Emerging Europe for the infrastructure business environment. The construction industry is forecast to reach a value of RON36.2 billion (US$13.41 billion) by 2011, from an estimated RON20.88 billion (US$7.43 billion) in 2006.

Prior to the start of the crisis, the Romanian construction industry was one of the most vibrant in the European Union, but this changed dramatically in 2009, when construction output fell by 15%, with a similar reduction following in 2010. In 2011 Romanian construction market should finally lead to a measure of stabilisation on the market, but growth is not likely to return before 2012. PMR Ltd released "Construction sector in Romania 2011- Development forecasts for 2011–2013" report in which they forecast stabilisation and return to the overall construction market in 2012.

Romanian civil engineering construction has registered considerably better performance in 2011 compared to the residential and non-residential segments, which posted decreases. The reason behind this is increased capital expenditure on infrastructure projects, particularly road and railway construction. Despite the strong economic downturn Romania experienced in 2009 and 2010, the value of civil engineering works has not decreased greatly, compared to the decreases in non-residential and residential construction. According to the latest PMR report, entitled Construction sector in Romania 2012 - Development forecasts for 2012–2014, civil engineering increased by nearly 16% in 2011, reaching RON 35 billion (€8.3 billion).
