= Project agreement (Canada) =

A project agreement is an agreement between the owner/developer of a construction project and the construction trade unions that will perform that construction work. A project agreement modifies the terms of otherwise applicable construction collective agreements for purposes of a specific construction project or a defined set of construction projects. Without exception, Project Agreements provide that there will be no strikes or lockouts on the covered construction project or projects, thereby removing a significant source of risk to the owner/developers of these projects. Project agreements typically replicate the principal economic terms of the otherwise applicable construction collective agreements, although there may be specific modifications to those terms.

Labour relations statutes in most Canadian jurisdictions contain provisions that specifically allow for the negotiation of project agreements. This is in contrast with the United States (see Project Labor Agreements) where there is no specific provisions pertaining to project labor agreements in the National Labor Relations Act. In Ontario, the Conservative Government amended the Labour Relations Act (Bill 139) to facilitate the adoption of Project Agreements that cover multiple projects as well as projects initiated subsequent to the commencement of a Project Agreement.

The Canadian statutory tradition of supporting and facilitating project agreements has led to their adoption in a wide range of circumstances in both the public and private sector. Major construction projects that were completed under the terms of project agreements include: various private sector industrial projects (e.g., Hudson Bay Mining Improvement Project in Flin Flon, Tembec Paper Mill Expansion in Pine Falls, and Co-op Oil Refinery in Regina), major public sector projects (Highway 407 Construction in Ontario, Confederation Bridge project in Prince Edward Island, and multiple projects undertaken by various provincial hydro-electric authorities.) Had the City of Toronto won its bid to host the Olympics, construction related to the Olympics would have been carried out under the terms of a Project Agreement.

Governments, in their capacity as owner/developers of construction projects, have used project agreements to secure training and employment opportunities for groups that might otherwise not have access to skilled construction work. For example, the Project Agreement governing the construction of the Vancouver Island Highway provided for explicit employment equity hiring focused on women and members of First Nations.
