= Modular addition =

Prefabricated housing addition

Modular additions are usually side and second-story additions to homes that are pre-fabricated at the facilities. General characteristics of a modular home apply. For a second-story modular addition the existing house should have a sound structure as modular rooms are 30%+ heavier than the same stick-built. Modular additions are built in the facility, brought to the site and “dropped” by crane on the new location.

Even though it is assumed that modular additions are less expensive than traditional stick built this is rarely true when compared by square footage. The buyer would generally get more wood and better insulation plus benefits of controlled environment but total cost of the contract would be about the same.

== See also ==
- Prefabricated home
- Manufactured housing
- Stick-built home
