= Fill trestle =

Temporary construction trestle

A fill trestle or filling trestle is a temporary construction trestle that is built to provide a scaffolding for the placement of fill or an earthen dam. Typically, the trestle is built across the valley and a railway is laid across the trestle. Specially designed side-dumping railroad cars filled with earth or gravel are pushed onto it and dumped, burying the trestle. Typically, a fill trestle is constructed out of wood which remains buried in the fill and eventually decomposes. Advances in construction technology, particularly the development of the dump truck, have rendered the fill trestle technique obsolete.
