= Driven to refusal =

Engineering/surveying term used in pile-driving

This is an engineering term for describing how far to drive piles. It is also used in surveying when driving metal posts and monuments that are to be used as bench marks (ie. the elevation of which will be established to a high degree of accuracy). When a very high degree of stability is required the post will be inside an oil filled outer casing to protect it against movement of the surrounding ground usually because of the frost.

A rod or pile has been "driven to refusal" when five more blows of an adequate hammer will not budge the rod or pile.
