= Dry mortar production line =

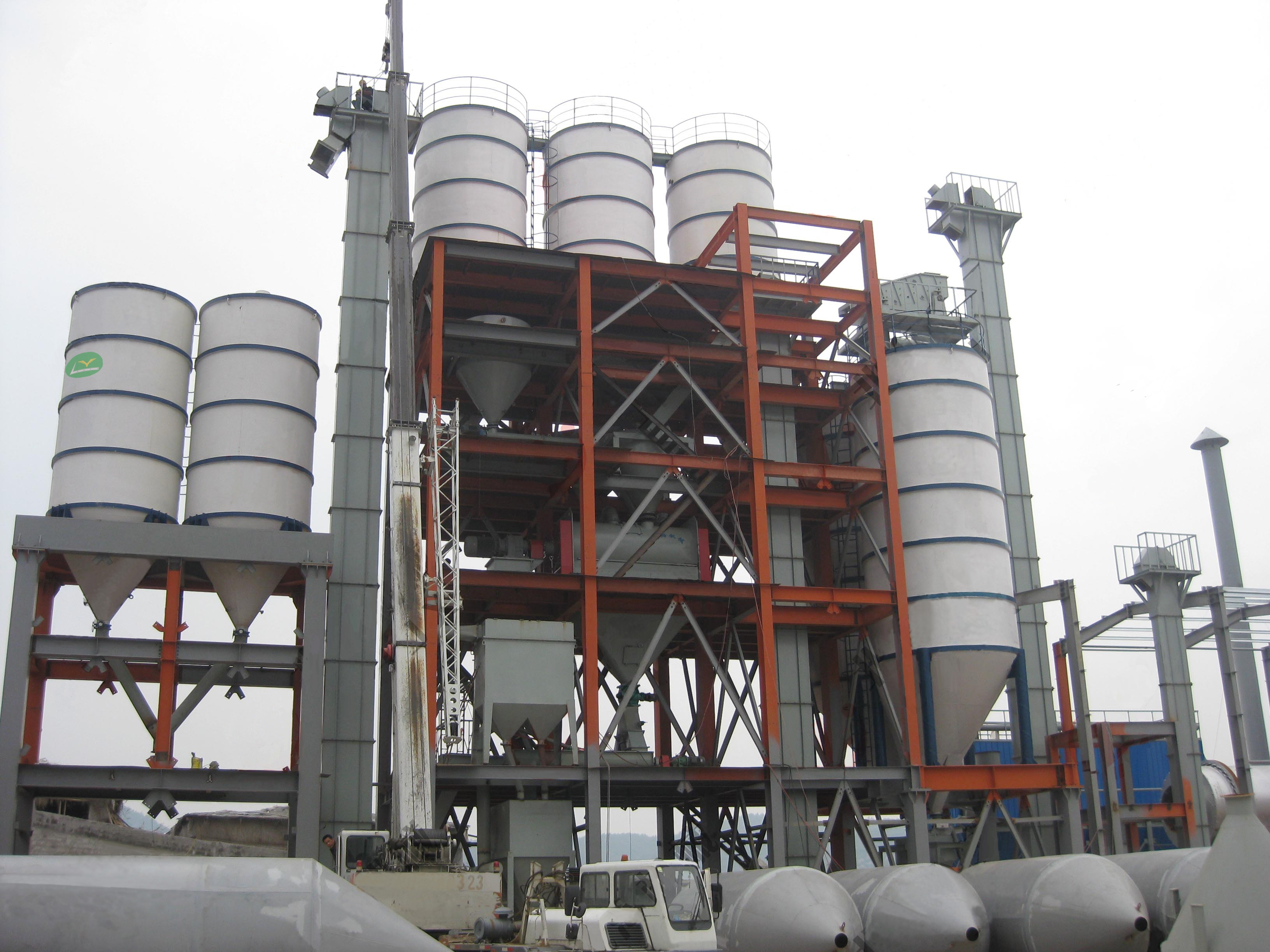
Dry mortar production line at work site.

Dry mortar production line (or dry mortar machine) is a set of machinery that produces dry mortar (also known as dry premixed mortar or hydraulicity cement mortar) for construction industry and other uses. It is mainly composed of elevator, premix bin, stock bin, mixing engine, finished product warehouse, automatic packing machine, dust collector and electric control cabinet. Dry mortar mixer can be vertical or horizontal type and there are many models for choosing according to customer's actual conditions.

== Mechanical principle ==
The paddles carried by a pair of counter-rotating spindles throw the aggregates up and cause zero gravity phenomenon. The aggregates get mixed into each other, and form a fluidized zero gravity zone. Swirling air generates surround the spindles and moves the aggregates for uniform mixing. Final mixture is transferred to storage bin through pneumatic gate.

== Classifications ==
According to the structure, the dry mortar production line can be classified as four different types: Tower type, Stair type, Block type and Flat type. According to the operating mode, the dry mortar production line can be classified as manual type, auto-manual type, auto type.

According to the output size, it can be divided into simple dry mortar production line and automatic dry mortar plant. The output of simple line is generally 1-8t per hour, and the output of automatic line is generally more than 15t per hour. The solution can be customized according to the customer's site and budget.

== Application ==
The dry mortar production line can be adopted in production processes of regular dry masonry mortar, plastering mortar, thermal mortar, anti-crack mortar, self-leveling mortar and decorative mortar etc.

== Advantages of dry mix mortar production line ==
High efficiency, low cost, easy operation and high quality;

Easy to install and maintain;

Low noise and energy consumption;

Dry mix mortar production line has wide application, which can be used to produce varieties of mortars.

== See also ==
- Mortar (masonry)
