= Nanoconcrete =

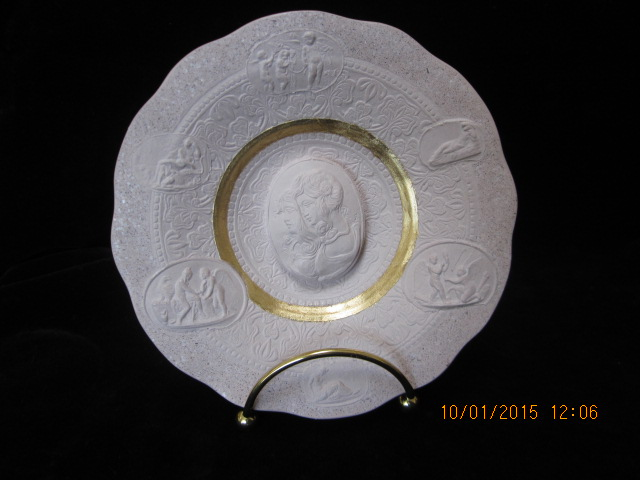
Decorative plate made of Nano concrete with High-Energy Mixing (HEM)

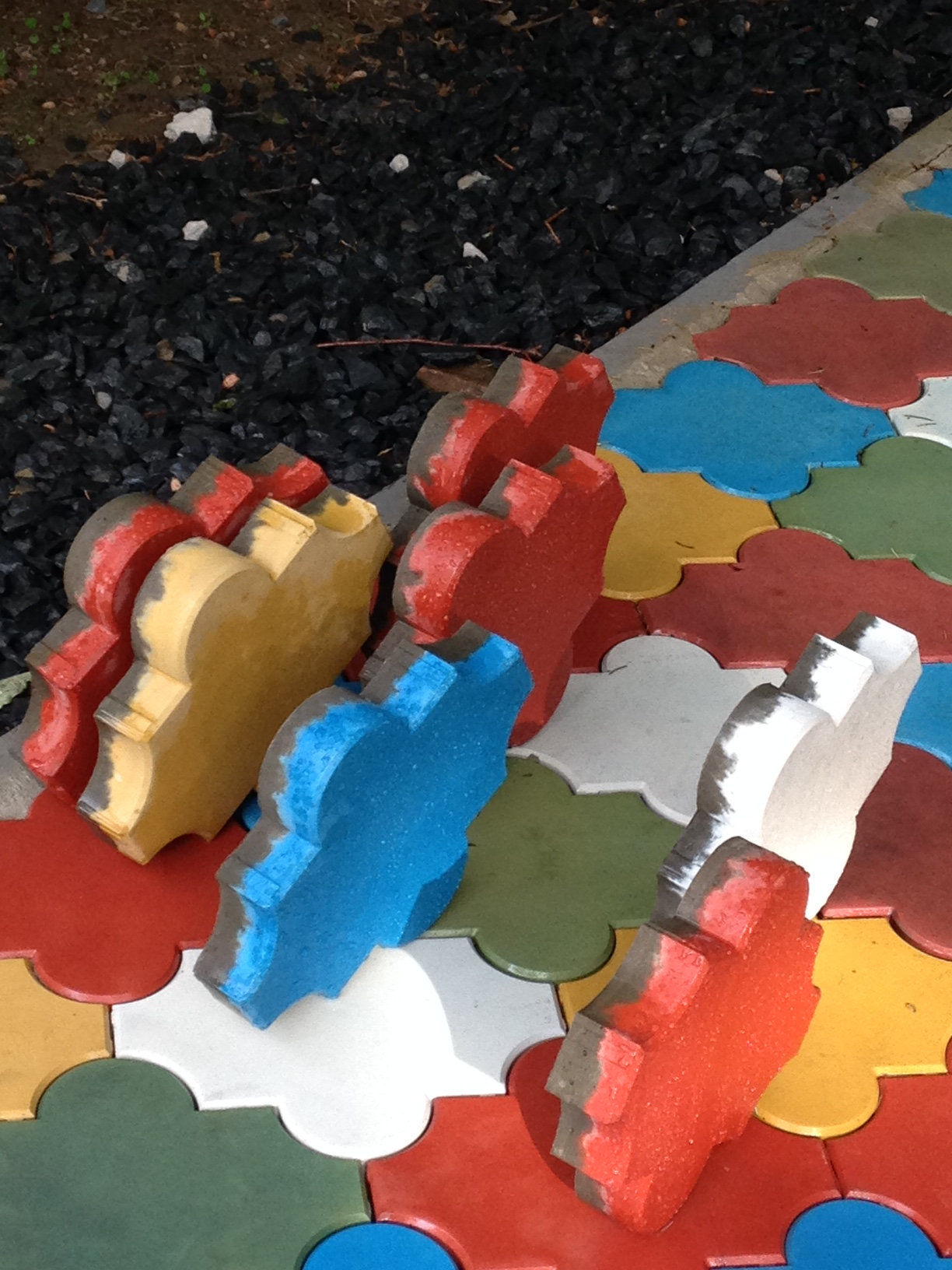
Two-layered pavers, pigmented top layer made of HEM nanoconcrete

Nanoconcrete (also spelled nano concrete or nano-concrete) is a form of concrete that contains Portland cement particles that are no greater than 100 μm and particles of silica no greater than 500 μm, which fill voids that would otherwise occur in normal concrete, thereby substantially increasing the material's strength. It is also a product of high-energy mixing (HEM) of conventional cement, sand and water which is a bottom-up approach of nano technology.

== Role of nano particles ==
Incorporating ultra-fine particles into a Portland-cement paste within a concrete mixture in accordance with top-down approach of nano technology reduces the void space between the cement and aggregate in the cured concrete. This improves strength, durability, shrinkage and bonding to steel reinforcing bars.

Recent studies have explored the use of computer vision techniques for detecting structural changes in lightweight concrete modified with nanoparticles. These approaches enable non-destructive assessment of microstructural heterogeneity and degradation processes in advanced cement-based materials.

== Manufacture ==
To ensure the mixing is thorough enough to create nanoconcrete, the mixer must apply a total mixing power to the mixture of 30–600 watts per kilogram of the mix. This mixing must continue long enough to yield a net specific energy expended upon the mix of at least 5000 joules per kilogram of the mix. and may be increased to 30–80 kJ per kilogram. A superplasticizer is then added to the activated mixture which can later be mixed with aggregates in a conventional concrete mixer. In the HEM process, the intense mixing of cement and water with or without sand in conditions of quasi-laminar flow, Reynolds number 20-800 provides dissipation and absorption of energy by the mixture and increases shear stresses on the surface of cement particles. As a result, the temperature of the mixture increases by 20–25 and more degrees Celsius. This intense mixing serves to deepen hydration process inside the cement particles. The nano-sized colloid Calcium Silicate Hydrate (C-S-H) formation increased several times compared with conventional mixing. Thus, the ordinary concrete transforms to nanoconcrete. The initial natural process of cement hydration with formation of colloidal globules about 5 nm in diameter spreads into the entire volume of cement–water matrix as the energy expended upon the mix. The liquid activated mixture can be used by itself for casting small architectural details and decorative items, or expanded with gas-forming admixture for making Aerated HEM Nanoconcrete as a lightweight concrete. HEM Nanoconcrete hardens in low and subzero temperature conditions because the liquid phase inside the nano-pores of C-S-H gel doesn't freeze at temperatures from −8 to −42 degrees Celsius. The increased volume of gel reduces capillarity in solid and porous materials.
