= EN 206+A2 =

European standard on concrete

EN 206+A2 Concrete – Part 1: Specification, performance, production and conformity (formerly EN 206 and EN 206-1 and EN 206+A1) is a European standard elaborated by the CEN/TC 104 "Concrete and related products" technical committee.

== See also ==
- List of EN standards
- European Committee for Standardization
- EN 197-1: Cement – Part 1 : Composition, specifications and conformity criteria for common cements
- EN 197-2: Cement – Part 2 : Conformity evaluation
- EN 1992 Eurocode 2: Design of concrete structures
