= Quarter minus =

Crushed rock aggregate

Quarter minus is a type of construction aggregate that is usually made from crushed basalt (but can be made of other rock types) from which the crushed rock product is not any bigger than 1/4" in diameter. The quarter minus rock size can consist of rock in diameter as big as 1/4" in size and "fines" (anything smaller than the maximum allowable rock size (which in this case is 1/4), even as small as stone dust). Any aggregate with the name "minus" can contain up to 80% fines. Quarter minus is mostly used as filler aggregate for bigger aggregate, empty space between two different sized aggregate, vehicle parking grade, and landscape surfaces. A positive of using quarter minus as a landscape aggregate is that it does not provide a home for pests and does not decompose like other landscape aggregates like wood-chips, for example.
