= Johnson bar =

A Johnson bar (also Johnson corrugated bar) is a type of corrugated high-carbon steel rebar used to reinforce concrete.

The Johnson bar was invented by A.L. Johnson of the St. Louis Expanded Metal Company. Its specific efficacy comes from having "alternate elevations and depressions to grip the concrete," with the shoulders of the corrugations having "an inclination with the axis of the bar" to prevent slipping between the bar and the concrete. The pattern of elevations and depressions aids in the stability of the structure; even if a Johnson bar no longer is bonded to the concrete (due to vibrations, for instance, or being smeared with oil as may happen during careless construction, reducing the adhesion significantly), it will have a hold on the concrete stronger than a plain smooth-sided bar.
