= Bowen Construction =

Company of Ireland

- Industry: Construction
- Defunct: 2011
- Fate: Liquidation
- Headquarters: Ireland

Bowen Construction was Ireland's sixth largest construction company and formed a core part of the broader Bowen Group which once had annual revenues approaching €350 million during Ireland's building boom. The Group had operations throughout the island of Ireland and the UK with main offices in Cork, Dublin and London (through its subsidiary Bowen PLC) as well as smaller regional offices in Limerick, Belfast and Waterford.

The Bowen Group was headed up by Chairman & Chief Executive John R. Bowen and is headquartered in Cork, Ireland.

On 25 July 2011 Bowen Construction was put into liquidation with the loss of at least 76 direct jobs. This followed Bowen UK being placed into administration earlier that month.

== Projects ==
Some of the company's major projects included:

1. Opera Avenue, Cork (€100m retail & residential scheme in Cork city centre)
2. Old Bailey Office Complex, London (Stg£30m 90,000sq ft office building)
3. Luas Light Rail Project - Sandyford to Cherrywood, Dublin (€75m light rail scheme)
4. M7 Motorway Nenagh to Castletown (€60m National Motorway)
5. Douglas Village Shopping Centre, Cork (€80m retail centre extension)
6. Mahon Point Shopping Center, Cork
