= Bamboo-mud wall =

Wall construction method

Bamboo-mud wall (編竹夾泥牆, also known as Bamboo-net clay wall, Taiwanese wattle, and daub) is a composite wall construction method largely used in Taiwan under Japanese rule in the early 20th century. Derived from Japanese wattle and daub (木舞, 小舞), Bamboo-mud wall differs from Japanese processor in its materiality, using bamboo instead of wood for woven lattice.

== History ==
In conjunction of modernization, the Japanese built large concrete public buildings throughout Taiwan, at the same time, Japanese officials and government employees from mainland Japan demanded a significant amount of housing. To solve this need, the Government-General in Taiwan issued Standard Building Drawings of Officer’s Residences in 1922, and thus built a large number of standard housings based on traditional Japanese wood structures. Non governmental houses followed this technique soon afterwards. The transformation from Japanese wattle and daub to Taiwanese Bamboo-mud wall, is due to the fundamental difference of climate and flora between two regions.

Although largely built on the island of Taiwan, some are torn down during the World War II to prevent wildfire among wood structures during Allies's heavy raid on Taipei and other cities.

These houses applying Bamboo-mudwall flourished until 1945, when the Allies took over Taiwan from Japan's reign. Republic of China (Taiwan) soon retreated from the Chinese Civil War and relocated the government to Taiwan, houses built for Japanese officials served the new government's officials seamlessly, as a result, many of the houses are kept intact and taken care of.

== Description ==
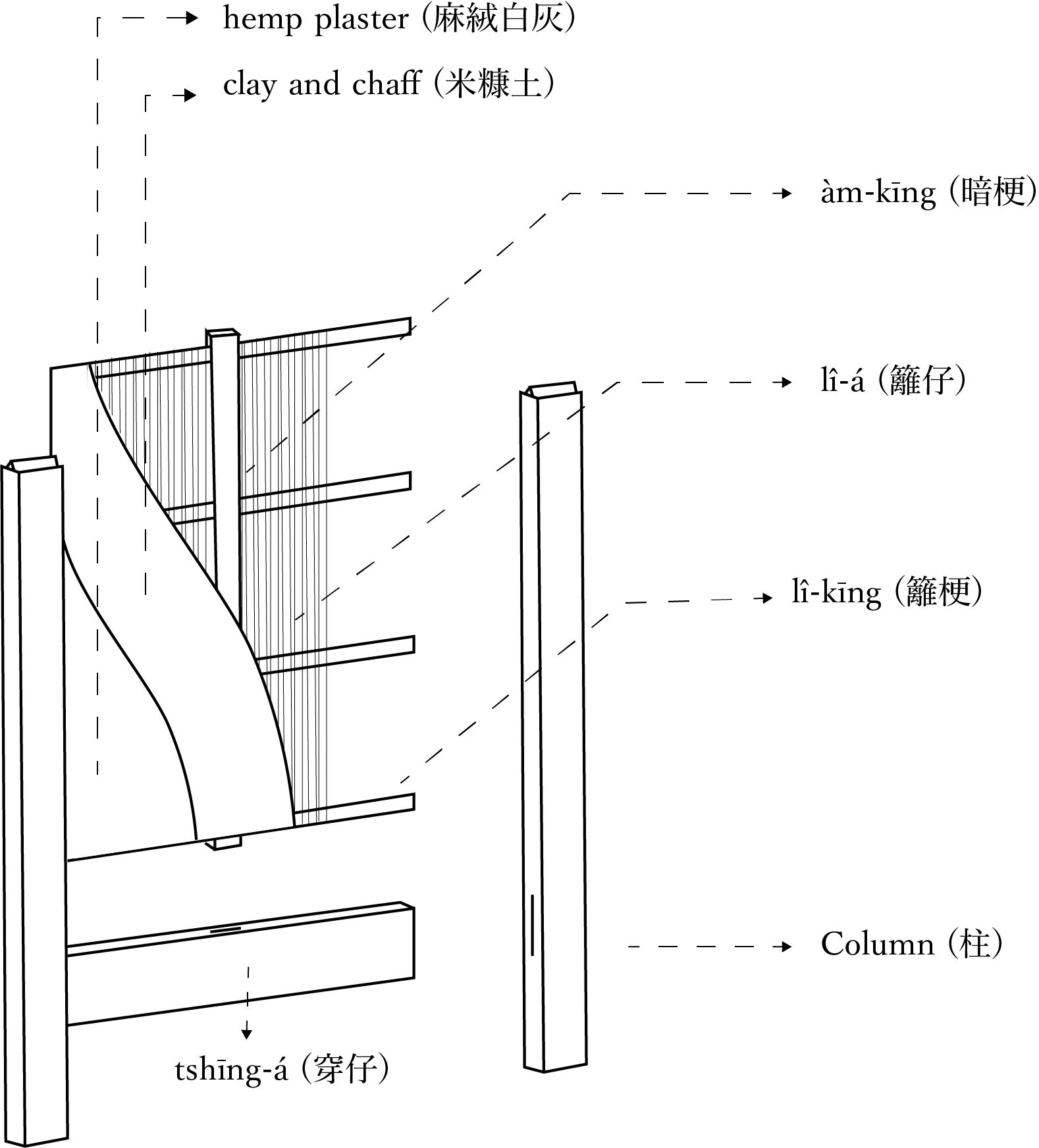
Isometric sectional construction view of bamboo-mud wall.

Bamboo-mud wall is a common filling in wood frame walls found in Taiwan. Bamboo wattle reinforce mud wall structure by weaving themselves together, including thicker, wider horizontal strips called lî-kīng (籬梗) and thinner, narrower horizontal strips called lî-á (籬仔). For larger walls, builders add timber strips, about 6 cm in width, called àm-kīng (暗梗) between vertical frame edge columns to facilitate adhesion of mud to the housing structure. Similarly to àm-kīng, there are sometimes horizontal reinforcing timber strips locked on the columns called tshīng-á (穿仔).

Generally speaking, lî-kīngs are 24 –30 cm apart from one another, and àm-kīngs are added for spans over 45 cm.

Mud is cured compound composed with clay and chaff, daubed onto the bamboo wattle on both sides, roughly 3.5 to 4.5 cm thick altogether. Hemp plaster daubed last for finish layer.

== Conservation ==
1. Light intervention: reapplying hemp plaster and surface clay and chaff.
2. Medium intervention: reapplying hemp plaster and most of the clay and chaff, but not the bamboo strips.
3. Deep intervention: involving new bamboo strips and reweaving thoroughly.

Before the conservation, an evaluation on timber frame integrity and load path continuity is necessary. And if new bamboo strips are to be used, they should have anticorrosive and fireproof treatment beforehand.

During conservation, should apply same weaving pattern of bamboo strips to prevent structural alteration; if there are pipelines in the wall, a layer of hemp net should apply on the pipes to reinforce the adhesion; and the contraction of clay should be calculated and refined after drying.

After conservation, many examples in Taiwan left a half-opened wall to demonstrate the traditional technology for educational purposes.

== Examples ==
- Qidong Street Japanese Houses
- Kishu An Forest of Literature
- Japanese Dormitory of Nancaiyuan
- CNPC Wang Hongyi housing complex south
