= Filigree concrete =

The Filigree Wideslab method is a process for construction of concrete floor decks from two interconnected concrete placements, one precast in a factory, and the other done in the field. The method was developed during the late 1960s by Harry H. Wise as a more efficient and economic construction process than conventional cast-in-place technologies.

== Description ==
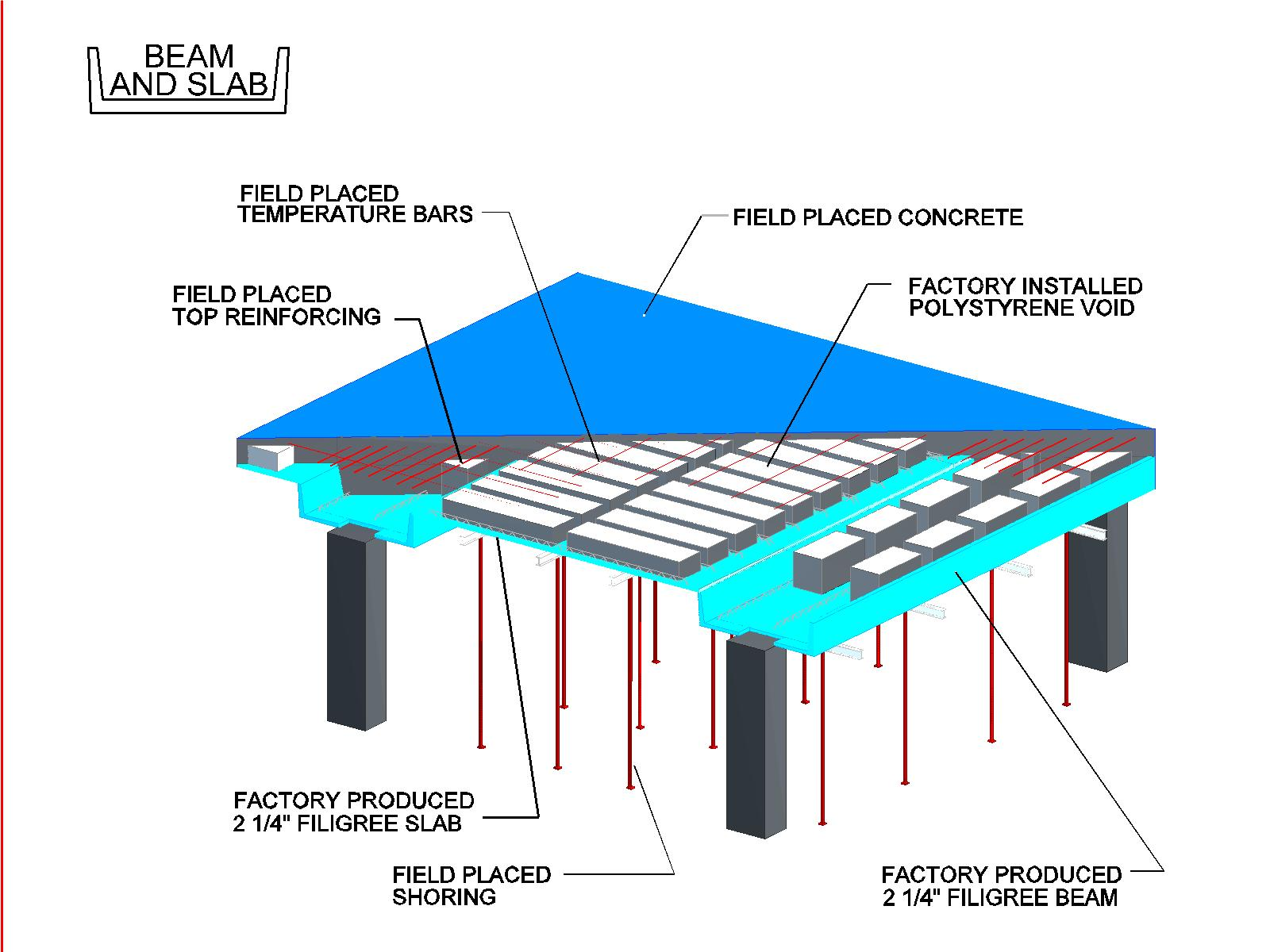
Detail of construction

The process begins by manufacturing thin precast concrete panels, typically 2.25" thick, with the deck's bottom reinforcement included. The panels are then shipped to a jobsite and erected on temporary shoring. Subsequently, the deck's top reinforcing steel is placed on top of the precast panels at the site, and concrete is poured over the entire assembly to achieve the final thickness of the deck.

This process effectively accelerates the construction of structures by eliminating the need for costly and time-consuming field forming, and the placing of bottom reinforcement. Polystyrene blocks are often incorporated into the panels during their manufacture in order to create voids, reducing both the quantity and cost of concrete added in the field, and the overall weight of the structure, which further reduces the costs of columns and foundations.

The soffits of the panels have a smooth uniform finish as a result of casting them in polished steel molds. This reduces the labor cost and time typically required to grind and patch the soffits of cast-in-place concrete decks to achieve an acceptable aesthetic finish.

The method of deck construction can be applied anywhere conventionally poured-in-place concrete is specified, such as flat plate, beam and slab, and wall-bearing structures.

== See also ==
- Voided biaxial slab – Type of reinforced concrete slab
