= Ground reinforcement =

Ground reinforcement is a reinforcing element placed on a flat surface in order to increase accessibility for vehicles and ensure proper rainwater drainage in addition to protection. The reinforcing element, usually in the form of grids, is used beneath grass, asphalt, concrete in roads, parking lots, driveways and paths.

== Materials ==
The materials used for ground reinforcement include iron, plywood and recycled plastic Recycled plastic possesses the desirable properties of water resistance and recycling opportunities, in addition to the sustainability.

== Installation ==
Iron plates, being heavy, are generally installed using a crane while plywood and plastic reinforcements are placed by hand. Ground reinforcement grids are installed by preparing a suitable depth of sub base material, overlaid with a screed layer of fine gravel or sharp sand to create a level followed by geotextile membrane before final assembly and in-filling of the final grid surface. Typical ground reinforcement systems involve gravel stabilization and grass reinforcement. These systems reinforce the surface to enable use by vehicles.
