= Acid brick =

Bricks designed to be resistant to acid

Acid brick or acid resistant brick is a specially made form of masonry brick that is chemically resistant and thermally durable. Acid brick is created from high silica shale and fired at higher temperatures than those used for conventional brick. Some manufacturers create the brick by baking it for over a week. It has an average compressive strength of approximately 23,000 PSI.

The ASTM specification C-279 creates specifications for acid brick properties. Acid brick is not resistant against hydrofluoric acid or strong alkali.

== Varieties ==
Acid brick comes in multiple varieties. The most frequently used variety is red shale. Others include fireclay, silica brick, and carbon brick.
