= Scabbling =

Process in masonry

Example of a compact scabbler machine. Video.

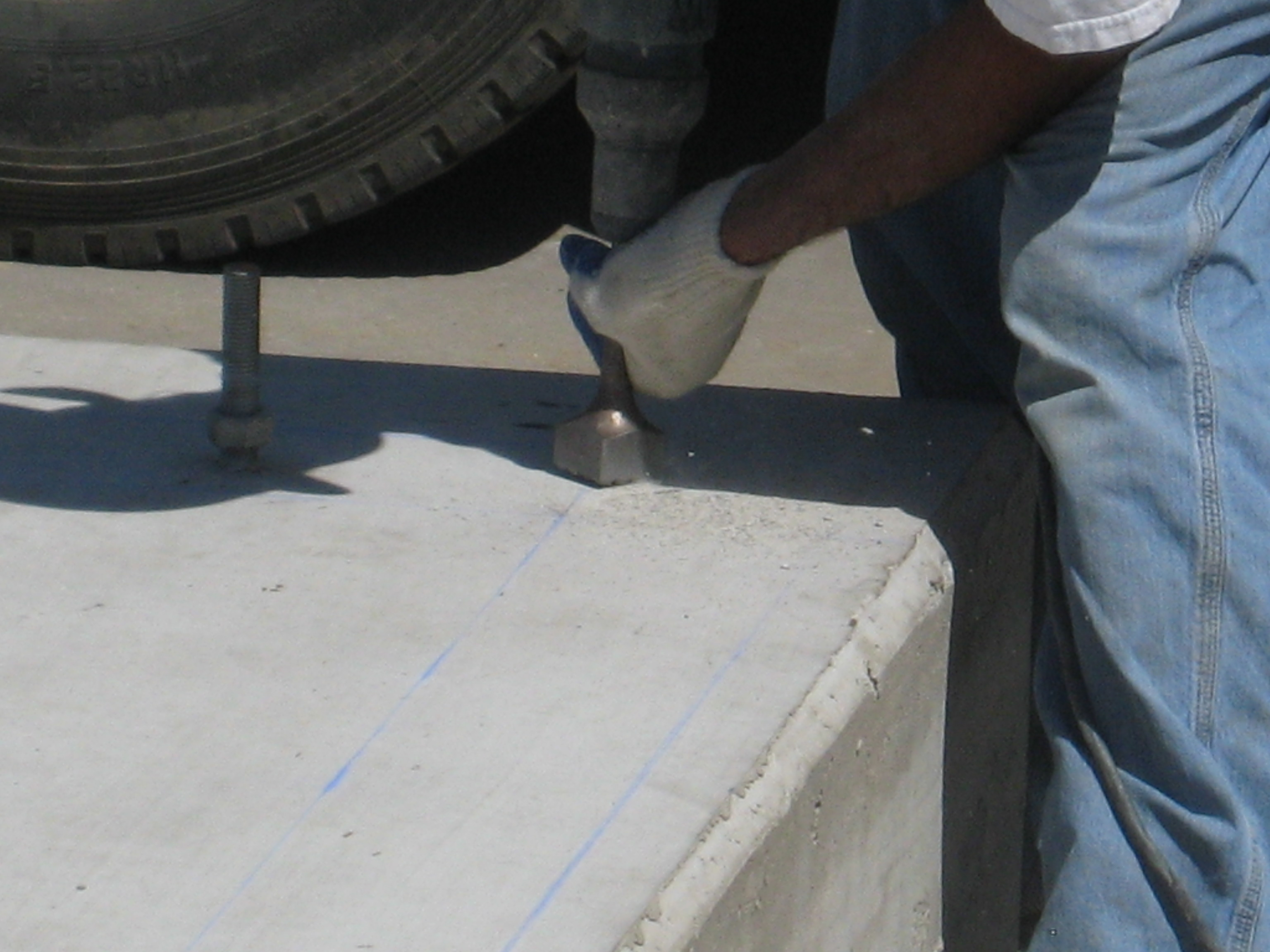
A worker beginning to scabble a concrete foundation prior to installing grout for an equipment skid.

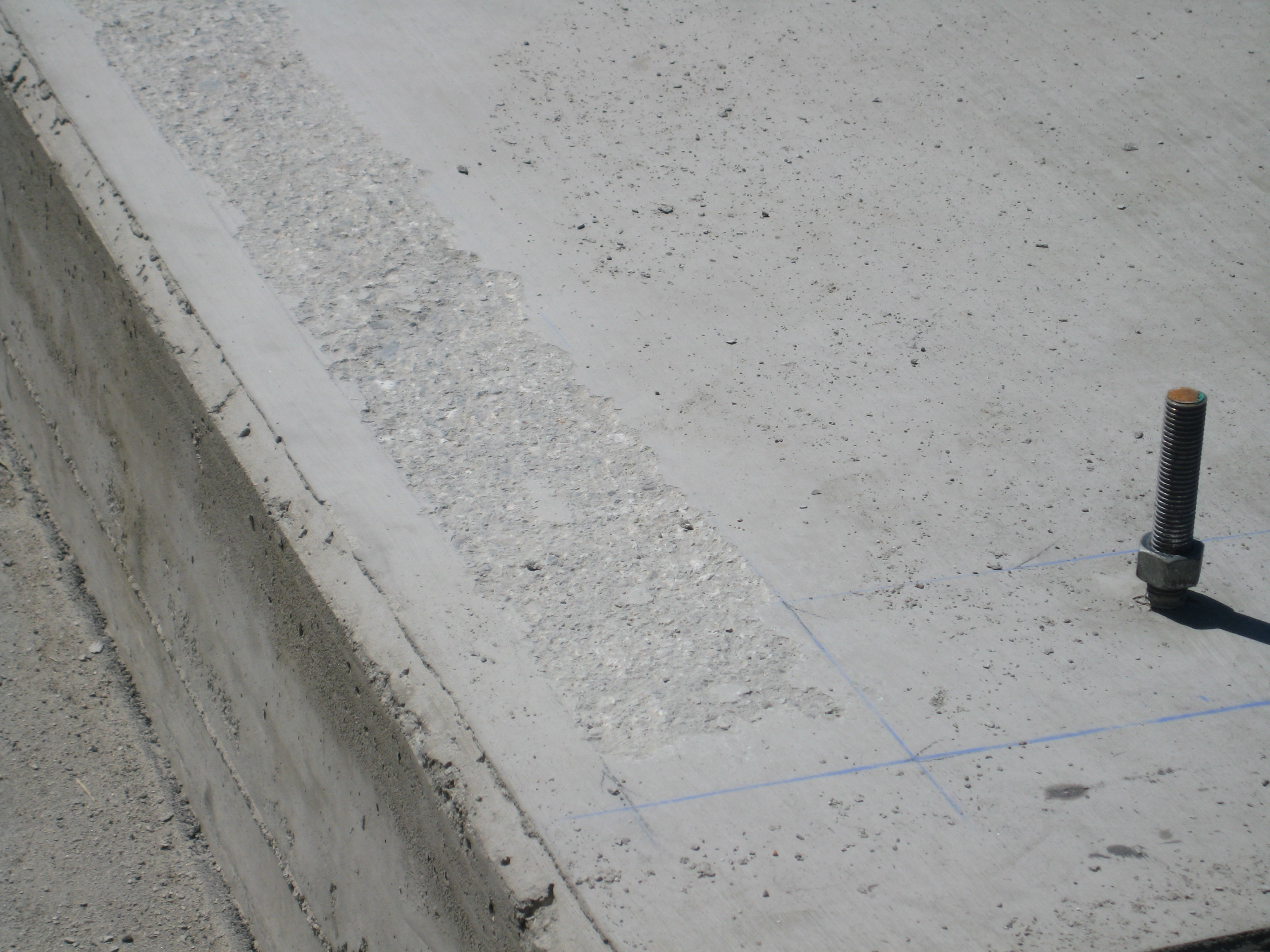
Closeup of scabbled concrete during the process of preparing a foundation for grouting under a new equipment skid.

Scabbling—also called scappling—is the process of reducing stone or concrete. In masonry, it refers to shaping a stone to a rough square by use of an axe or hammer. In Kent, rag-stone masons call this "knobbling". It was similarly used to shape grindstones.

In modern construction, scabbling is a mechanical process of removing a thin layer of concrete from a structure, typically achieved by compressed air powered machines. A typical scabbling machine uses several heads, each with several carbide or steel tips that peck at the concrete. It operates by pounding a number of tipped rods down onto the concrete surface in rapid succession. It takes several passes with the machine to achieve the desired depth.

Scabbling is used to remove road markings, surface contamination (used in the nuclear industry), to add a decorative or textured pattern to concrete, or to prepare a concrete surface prior to the installation of grout.

Scarifying machines with flails attached to a drum cage are sometimes referred to as rotary scabblers. These walk behind machines are also referred to as concrete planers.

== See also ==
- Bush hammer – Masonry tool used to texturize stone and concrete
