= Voided biaxial slab =

Type of reinforced concrete slab

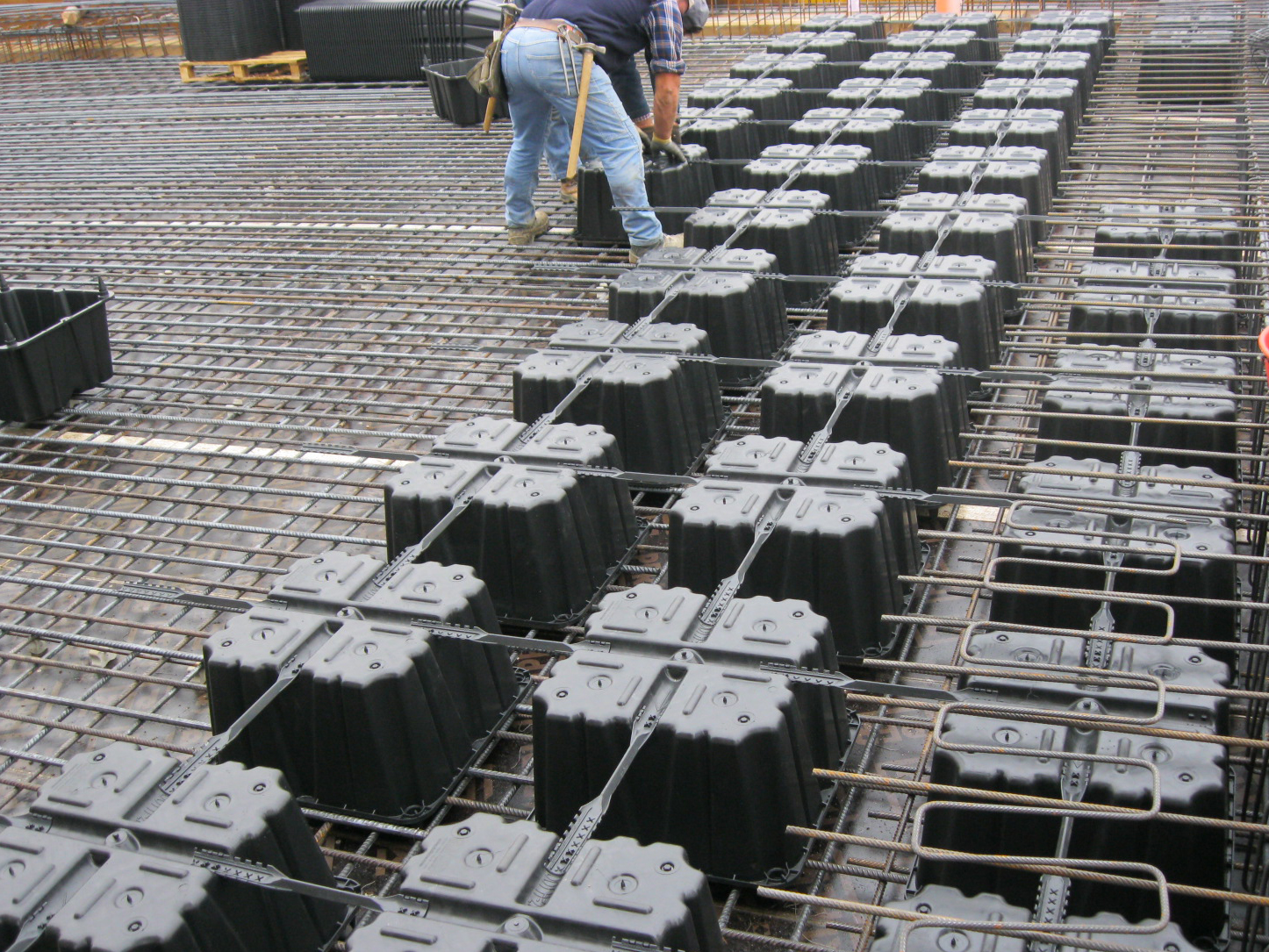
Concrete is poured around these plastic forms to create internal voids in the slab

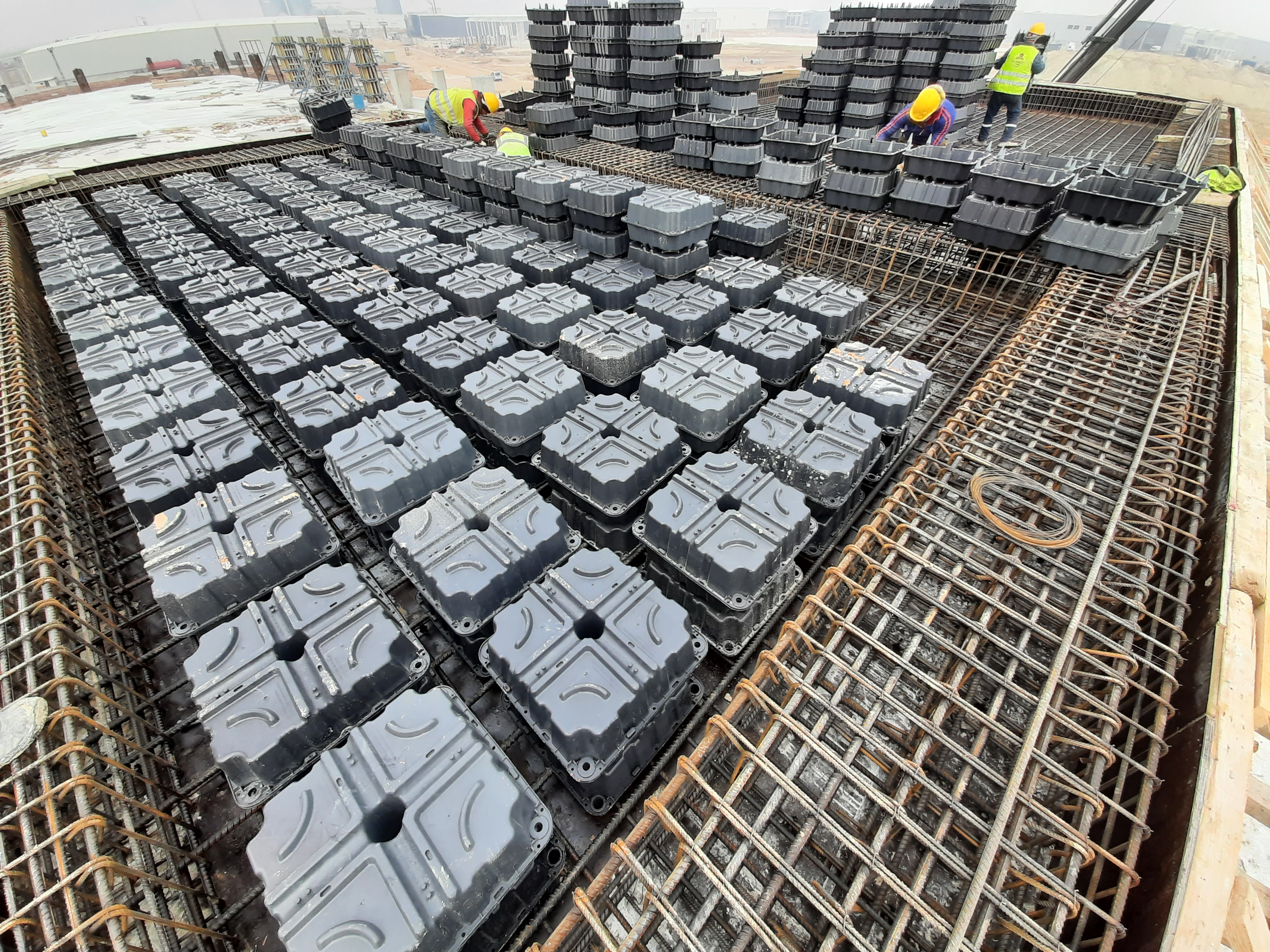
A voided biaxial slab installation in Turkey

Voided biaxial slabs, sometimes called biaxial slabs or voided slabs, are a type of reinforced concrete slab which incorporates air-filled voids to reduce the volume of concrete required. These voids enable cheaper construction and less environmental impact. Another major benefit of the system is its reduction in slab weight compared with regular solid decks. Up to 50% of the slab volume may be removed in voids, resulting in less load on structural members. This also allows increased weight and/or span, since the self-weight of the slab contributes less to the overall load.

== Theory ==
Concrete has numerous applications in building construction, but its use for horizontal slabs is limited by its relatively high density which reduces the maximum span. The usual method of rectifying this disadvantage is to incorporate some kind of reinforcement, which enables concrete slabs to be used for a broad range of spans and loading conditions. Traditional approaches to structural reinforcement involve embedding another material inside the concrete, however, biaxial slabs provide an alternative solution in the form of a two-way slab which incorporates orthogonal concrete "beams" within the slab. This allows greater support in both horizontal directions in order to transfer weight to a vertical member.

The general concept of voided biaxial slabs relies on voids created within the concrete at the time of casting. This creates an internal array of hollow boxes in the slab, which acts as grid of horizontal supports for the flat surface on top. Another advantage is the reduction in weight, achieved by removing mass which does not directly transfer weight to a vertical member. Typical solid slabs have a loading capacity of around one-third of their own weight, which can create problems for long spans and high loadings. By reducing the weight of the slab without compromising its structural strength, it is possible to create a thicker slab to support more weight over a longer span.

Hollow-core slabs, also known as voided slabs, initially appeared as one-way elements in Europe during the 1950s, and are still commonly manufactured in precast form for applications where fast construction and low self-weight are required. Waffle slabs are a common type of hollow-core slab which use the same principle as voided biaxial slabs. However, their voids are placed on the underside of the slab rather than embedded within the slab, leading to lower shear strength and fire resistance. There has been a range of proprietary implementations of voided biaxial slabs, including the use of polystyrene blocks as a filler material in the voids. However, many implementations have suffered from flexural cracking and lack of shear resistance.

== Structure ==
Cross-sectional diagram of a typical voided biaxial slab

All voided biaxial slabs incorporate an array of rigid void formers which contain air within the voids. These void formers are most commonly made of plastic such as high-density polyethylene, and may use recycled materials. The void formers are produced in a variety of shapes depending on the design of the slab. Common designs include spheres, boxes, ellipsoids and toroids.

The voids are usually placed in a grid-like arrangement, temporarily supported by a framework which is eventually enveloped in concrete. This framework has been implemented in various ways, but the most efficient method uses a steel mesh in order to reduce material use and create an optimal geometric proportion between concrete, reinforcement, and voids.

The voids are positioned in the middle of the cross section, where concrete is least beneficial to the structure. The integrity of the solid layers is maintained, as the top and bottom of the slab can experience particularly high stresses. This enables the slab to effectively resist both positive and negative bending moments.

Since the underside of the slab is flat it may be finished to create an interior ceiling, in contrast to the contoured underside of waffle slabs.

== Construction ==
=== Prefabricated systems ===
Some vendors of voided biaxial slabs supply prefabricated components which are quicker to install onsite. Prefabricated slabs also have the advantage of a smooth underside suitable for use as a ceiling without further finishing. Varying degrees of prefabrication are available, including entire slabs. Prefabricated modules commonly consist of a fully cast piece of slab, including all components encased in concrete. This technique consists of a "bubble-reinforced sandwich" of reinforcing mesh and voids cast in concrete. A contiguous layer of smooth finish concrete is then poured onsite, along with the addition of structural anchoring to fix the modules together.

=== Cast in site systems ===
Voided biaxial slabs cast onsite take longer to construct than prefabricated slabs, but are sometimes cheaper. In a typical casting procedure, a decking of formwork is constructed out of metal or wood. This provides temporary support for the voids and the curing concrete. After the decking is constructed, reinforcing mesh is installed to support the voids. Alternatively, the voids and mesh may be supplied as a prefabricated module. Since the air in the voids is of lower density than the surrounding concrete, it tends to float to the surface of the concrete. To ameliorate this, the slab may be cast in multiple layers so that the mesh is initially anchored and is then able to restrain the voids from floating upwards in later pours.

=== Failures ===
In 2017 the BubbleDeck system caused controversy due to the collapse of a parking garage at Eindhoven airport in the Netherlands. This was due to insufficient shear strength at the interface between the precast concrete slabs, potentially caused by high temperatures during construction. After the incident an investigation was started among buildings using the same flooring system, leading to the closure of several buildings in the Netherlands, including one at the University of Rotterdam and a school building under construction in Hoeven.

== Comparison to other slab types ==
Investigations according to Eurocodes have concluded that voided biaxial slabs may be modelled like solid slabs. To which degree depends on the shape of the voids. This is considered an advantage over one-way ribbed slabs, which must be calculated as an array of beams.

Compared to traditional solid slabs, the reduced self-weight of biaxial slabs allows for longer spans and/or reduced deck thickness. The overall mass of concrete can be reduced by 35–50% depending on the design, as a consequence of reduced slab mass, as well as lower requirements for vertical structure and foundations. Biaxial slabs commonly span up to 20 metres at a thickness of around 500 mm. The added strength also reduces the acoustic transmittance of the slab for low frequencies.

The reduced mass of biaxial slabs also results in a more environmentally friendly product which produces less CO_{2} emissions both in its construction and indirectly through the reduction of surrounding structural support. Total carbon emissions may be reduced by up to 41%. Slabs are one of the greatest consumers of concrete in many buildings, so reducing the slab mass can make a relatively large difference to the environmental impact of a building's construction.

Biaxial slabs may be marginally cheaper than solid slabs, partly due to the lower mass. If using prefabricated versions, labor can also be significantly reduced, resulting in faster and cheaper construction. This can yield time savings of up to 40% compared with traditional solid slabs. However, this is heavily dependent on the particular system, and systems relying on onsite placement of void formers requires much more labor than solid slabs.

Compared to one-way hollow-core slabs, biaxial slabs are more resistant to seismic disturbance. One-way decks are supported by a combination of walls and beams, leading to a relatively rigid structure which increases the risk of progressive collapse.

One of the most significant differences between solid slabs and voided biaxial slabs is their resistance to shear force. Due to a lower volume of concrete, the shear resistance is also reduced. For slabs using spherical voids, the shear resistance is approximately proportional to the volume of concrete, as the geometry of the voids causes efficient transfer of force to load-bearing parts, enabling all the concrete to be effective. Other shapes of voids, with flat or flattened surfaces, will result in more concrete and/or less strength. This relates especially to shear capacity, where the capacity of a slab with boxes can be 40% lower than for a slab of identical height using spherical voids. For punching shear, the capacity of a slab with spherical voids can be 600% higher than for a box slab. In some cases where greater shear resistance is required in a localised area (such as junctions with piers or walls), the voids may be omitted, leading to a partially solid slab.

== See also ==
- Concrete
- Reinforced concrete
- Building construction
- Construction engineering
- Structural engineering
- Filigree concrete
- Rebar
