= Wall plan =

A wall plan is a drawing which consists of complete details with dimensions (with an accuracy of an inch) about all four sides and ceiling of each and every room in a building. It is drawn with the help of a floor plan as the basic input.

The main contents in a Wall Plan are:

- Electrical points (like Switch Board Position, Light Position, etc.)
- Doors and windows (like position of doors and windows in the wall, etc.)
- Wardrobes and shelves (like size and position, etc.)
- Plumbing points (like faucet position, toilet position, sink position, etc.)
- Electronic points (like cable television points, telephone points, LAN points, etc.)
- Household items (like where to put where)
- Aesthetic items (like wall painting, clock, mirror, photos, etc.)
- Kitchen items (like positioning of microwave oven, water purifier, chimney, etc.)
