= Concrete hinge =

concrete hinge

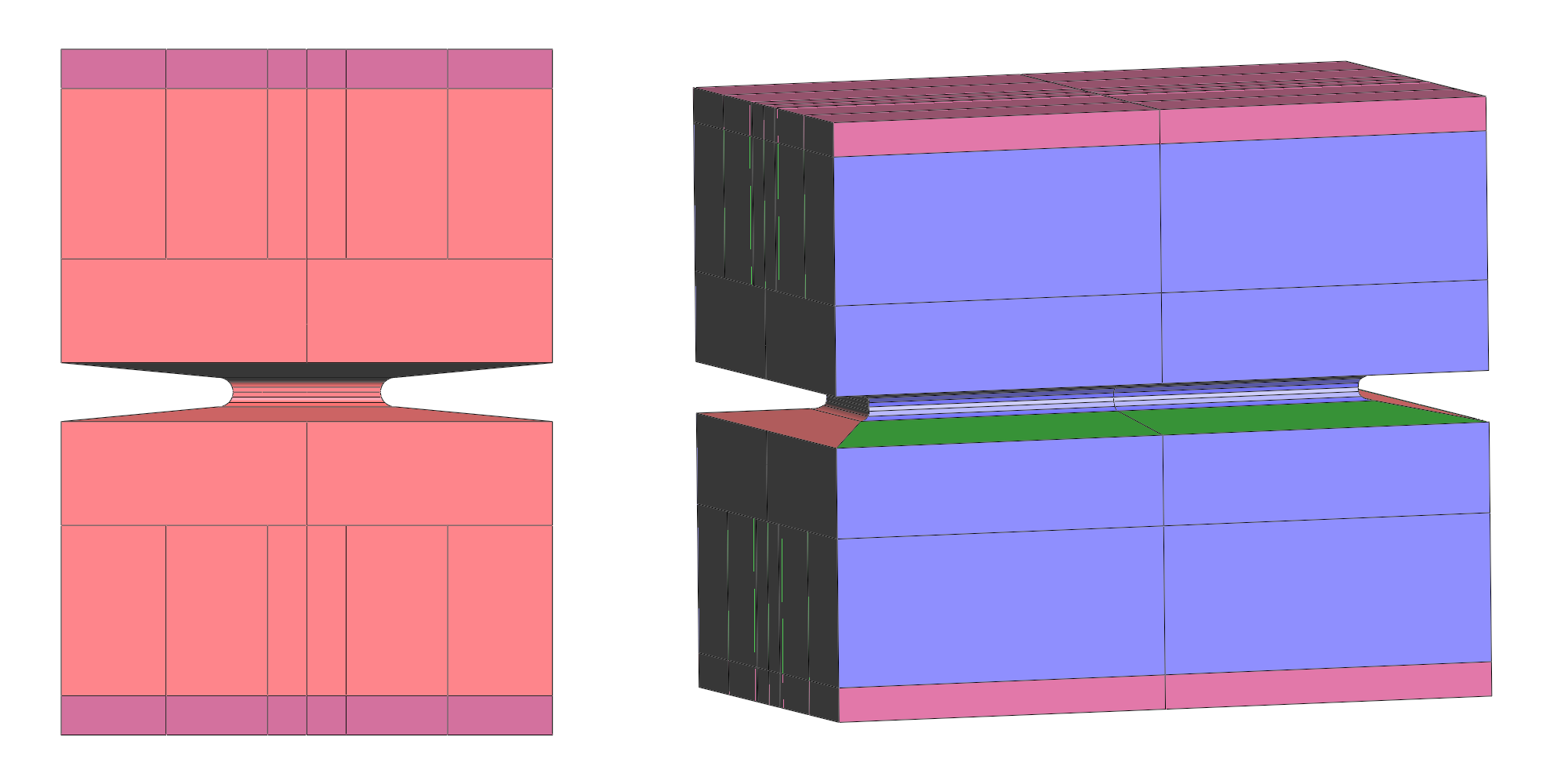
concrete hinge with front side notches

Concrete hinges are hinges produced out of concrete, with little or no steel in the hinge neck, which allows a rotation without a significant bending moment. The high rotations result from controlled tensile cracks as well as creep. Concrete hinges are mostly used in bridge engineering as monolithic, simple, economic alternative to steel hinges, which would need regular maintenance. Concrete hinges are also used in tunnel engineering. A concrete hinge consist of the hinge neck, which has a reduced cross section and of the hinge heads, which have a strong reinforcement.

== History and guidelines ==
Freyssinet invented the concrete hinges. Leonhardt introduced guidelines in the 1960s which are still used till the 2010s. Janßen introduced the application of concrete hinges in tunnel engineering. Gladwell developed another guideline for narrowing cross sections, which predicts a stiffer behaviour than the Leonhardt/Janßen-model Marx and Schacht translated Leonhardts guidelines for the first time in the nowadays used semipropablistic safteyconcept. Schlappal, Kalliauer and coworkers introduced for the first time both limit caces (service-limit-states (SLS) and ultimate-limite-states (ULS)). Kaufmann, Markić und Bimschas did further studies on concrete hinges.

== Stresses, rotational capacity, bearing capacity ==
normal stesses in loading direction

normal stresses in thickness direction

normal stresses in side direction

Due to triaxial compression, strength in the neck region is much higher than for uniaxial compression, because lateral expansion is restricted. Eurocode 2 suggests for typical dimensions a compressive strength equal to about twice of the unixalial compressive strength. Also the concrete hinge neck has no, or almost no reinforcement, but the concrete hinge heads need a dense reinforcement cache, because of tensile splitting.

== Literature ==
- Fritz Leonhardt: Vorlesungen über Massivbau - Teil 2 Sonderfälle der Bemessung im Stahlbetonbau. [Concrete hinges: test report, recommendations for structural design. Critical stress states of concrete under multiaxial static short-term loading Springer-Verlag, Berlin 1986, ISBN 3-540-16746-3, S. 123–132. (in German)
- VPI: Der Prüfingenieur. Ausgabe April 2010, S. 15–26, (bvpi.de PDF; 2,3 MB). (in German)
