= Concrete moisture meter =

Measurement tool

A concrete moisture meter is a type of moisture meter used by installers of flooring to measure the moisture levels of concrete. These meters have been used for decades to measure the moisture content in different materials and substances. Concrete meters have evolved from the successful wood moisture meter as flooring contractors tried to use their wood meters to measure the moisture in concrete.

Concrete moisture meters are designed to detect moisture to a depth of 1 inch (25 mm) of a concrete slab in order to avoid the rebar reinforcement below the surface. They are designed to be used as a relative test. The meters are used to "'Spot check' the top surface at one particular location on the slab." The results can determine the best place to put a concrete relative humidity test.

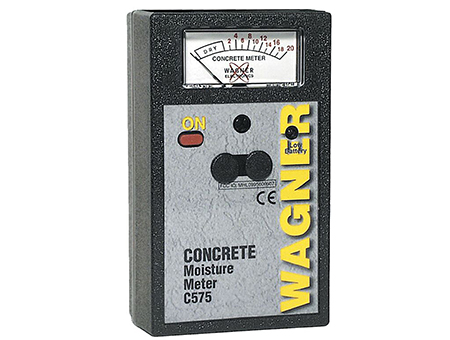
Wagner Electronics Discontinued Concrete Moisture Meter

== Limitations ==
There is no ASTM standard for using a concrete moisture meter to determine a final moisture content reading.

Concrete moisture meters, either non-pin or pin meters are affected by what it sees in the concrete. This can be anything from the density of the concrete and aggregate size to the chemical properties of the slab.

Uncovered concrete dries from the top down. Concrete moisture meters measure only the top inch at most and this area is drier than the concrete further down. Once a floor covering has been installed the moisture in the slab equilibrates. In order to ensure the equilibrated moisture will be a safe level for a floor covering, a relative humidity sensor must be drilled and placed at 40% of the depth of the slab. This depth has been proven to be the relative humidity percentage, that the slab will equilibrate once the top has been covered by a floor covering.
