= Iberian paleochristian decorated tile =

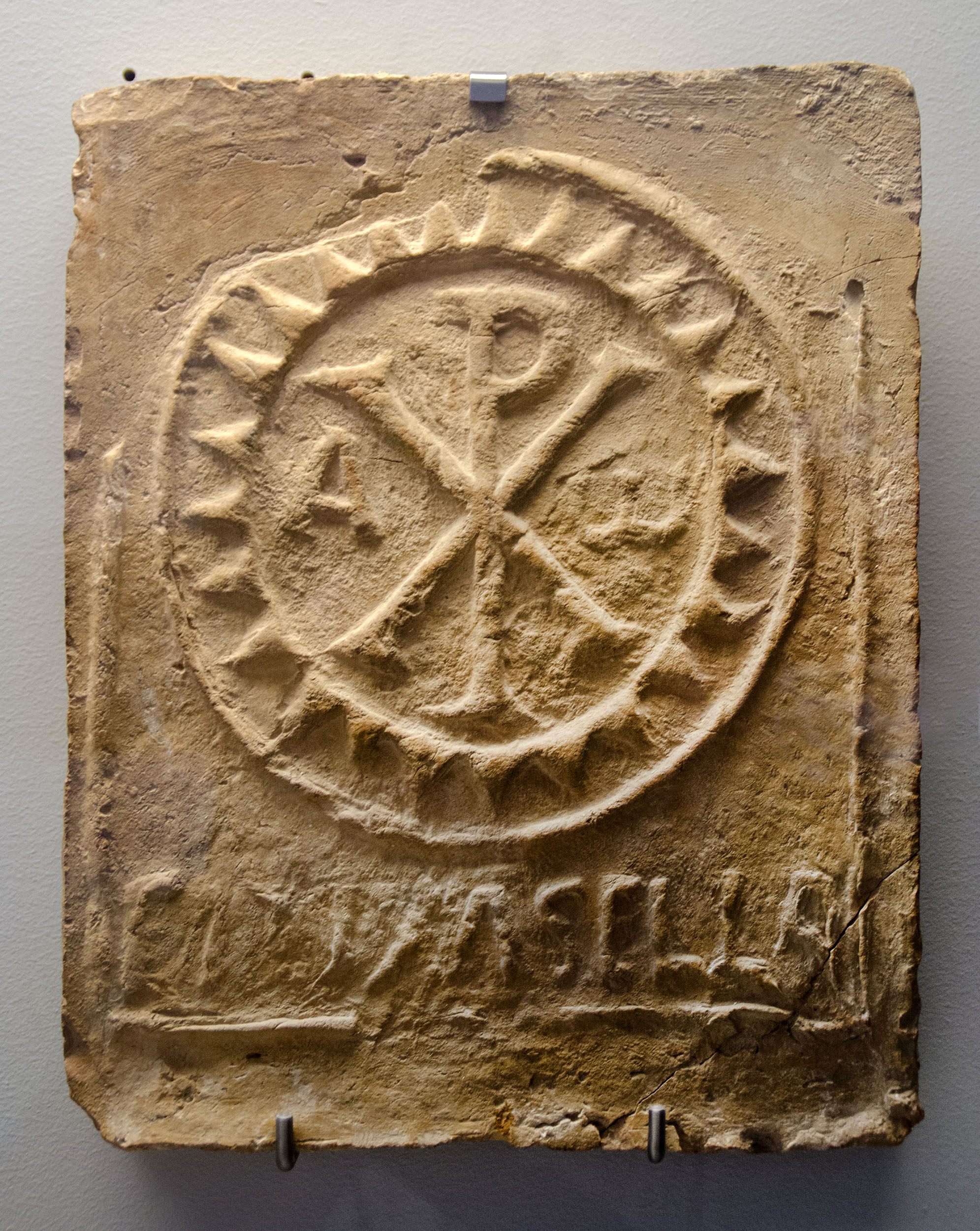
Tile with Chi Rho from Andalusia, Museo Arqueológico de Córdoba

Decorated ceramic tiles are paleochristian ceramic bricks with relief designs made by molding, used in the architecture of Late Antiquity in the south of the Iberian Peninsula, with two production centres identified in the valley of the Guadalquivir. The decorative motifs are mostly religious (in particular, the Chi Rho), although there are also zoomorphic and vegetal examples. Their function is not known, although use as funerary or, more recently, as ornamental elements in ceilings have been proposed .
