= Self-framing metal buildings =

Self-framing metal buildings are a form of pre-engineered building which utilizes roll formed roof and wall panel diaphragms as significant parts of the structural supporting system. Additional structural elements may include mill or cold-formed elements to stiffen the diaphragm perimeters, transfer forces between diaphragms and provide appropriate. As with most pre-engineered buildings, each building will be supplied with all necessary component parts to form a complete building system.

== Design criteria ==
Regardless of project site location, buildings must be designed in accordance with appropriate engineering due diligence. Buildings should be designed for all applicable loads including the following:

- Dead (self-weight) loads including mechanical and electrical components.
- Vertical live load of the building will be not less than (per local code) pounds per square foot applied on the horizontal projection of the roof.
- Wind load of the building will not be less than (per local code) miles per hour and will be distributed and applied in accordance with Chapter 16 of the International Building Code.
- All combining and distribution of auxiliary equipment loads imposed on the building system will be done in accordance with Chapter 16 of the "International Building Code".
- Seismic force magnitudes are not normally the controlling forces but North American building codes, require seismic analysis and assembly details to meet specific requirements regardless of force levels.

== In the United States ==
Engineered structural design must comply with the applicable sections of the latest edition of the "Specification for Structural Steel Buildings" of the American Institute of Steel Construction (AISC) and the "Specification for the Design of Cold Formed Steel Structural Members" of the American Iron and Steel Institute (AISI).

Many areas of the United States require the use of state or local building codes which may differ from the "International Building Code". Building codes such as the "International Building Code" and Uniform Building Code (UBC) are markedly different from each other and are often revised at the local level.

== In Canada ==
Self-framing buildings are within the scope of the National Building Code of Canada (NBCC) as adopted and modified by each Province and Territory. For steel structures, NBCC references CAN/CSA S16 Design of Steel Structures and CAN/CSA S136 North American Specification for the Design of Cold-Formed Steel Structural Members.

Manufacturers are required to be certified in accordance with CSA A660 Certification of Manufacturers of Steel Building Systems. Among other requirements, the manufacturer must supply drawings and documents sealed by a professional engineer licensed in the province or territory of the project site. A Certificate of Design and Manufacturing Conformance, duly completed by an engineer knowledgeable with the design and manufacturing, must be provided to the owner and submitted to the Authority Having Jurisdiction (AHJ) with the permit application.

The building code requires documents to be adequate to allow a review of the structural competence of the building (e.g. NBCC Part 4). The Authority Having Jurisdiction (AHJ) will usually require drawings expressing architectural aspects (e.g. Parts 3, 5 and 11). Due to the limited complexity and size of self-framed buildings, the manufacturer's drawings are frequently accepted for this purpose but the owner should be aware that this may not always be the case.

== Roof and wall panels ==
Exterior roof panels are usually a single continuous length from eave to ridge line for gable style buildings or from low eave to high eave on single slope or shed style buildings. Many manufacturers provide minimum 24 gauge (nominal: 0.0239 inch; 0.61 mm) thick sheet steel in self-framing roof designs.

Exterior wall panels are usually a single continuous length from the base channel to the eave of the building except where interrupted by wall openings. Many manufacturers provide minimum 24 gauge (nominal: 0.0239 inch; 0.61 mm) thick sheet steel in self-framing wall designs.

Diaphragm or racking strength of the wall and roof systems are dependent on issues such as the manufacturer's panel lap seam assembly and should be qualified by full-scale testing. Openings reduce the local structural capacity of the wall or roof assembly and should be considered in the original structural design. the manufacturer may provide guidance for limited field modifications for additional openings.

== Dimensions ==
Building width: 3 m (10' +/-) to 10 m (32' +/-) is common. Width is primarily limited by the capability of the roof panel to support the applied gravity loads (e.g. self-weight, snow) and wind uplift loads. In taller buildings, the wall panel may be a limiting factor to width due to buckling of the unsupported wall panel length.

Building length: 3 m (10' +/-) to 10 m (32' +/-) is common. Length is primarily limited by the ability of the load path to transfer loads to a vertical brace system (e.g. gable endwall). Building length can be extended with added discrete brace systems (e.g. roof level horizontal brace, portal frame, diagonal brace, interior partition shear wall).

Building height: 2.5 m (8' +/-) to 7.5 m (24' +/-) is common. Height is primarily limited by the capability of the wall panel to support the wind load. Height may be limited in narrow buildings due to shear capacity limit in the gable endwalls.

Many manufacturers publish tables relating loads to building dimensions and limitations (e.g. ratio of partial height panels to full height panels where wall openings are required).

== Delivery ==
Typically, self-framed buildings will be shipped to site in knocked-down condition with all parts and hardware. Smaller self-framed buildings may be fully assembled at the manufacturer's facility and transported to site.

== Project professionals and manufacturer-designed buildings ==
The project architect, sometimes called the Architect of Record, is typically responsible for aspects such as aesthetic, dimensional, occupant comfort and fire safety. When a pre-engineered building is selected for a project, the architect accepts conditions inherent in the manufacturer's product offerings for aspects such as materials, colours, structural form, dimensional modularity, etc. Despite the existence of the manufacturer's standard assembly details, the Architect remains responsible to ensure that the manufacturer's product and assembly is consistent with the building code requirements (e.g. continuity of air/vapour retarders, insulation, rain screen; size and location of exits; fire rated assemblies) and occupant or owner expectations.

Many jurisdictions recognize the distinction between the project engineer, sometimes called the Engineer of Record, and the manufacturer's employee or subcontract engineer, sometimes called a specialty engineer. The principal differences between these two entities on a project are the limits of commercial obligation, professional responsibility and liability.

The structural Engineer of Record is responsible to specify the design parameters for the project (e.g. materials, loads, design standards, service limits) and to ensure that the element and assembly designs by others are consistent in the global context of the finished building.

The specialty engineer is responsible to design only those elements which the manufacturer is commercially obligated to supply (e.g. by contract) and to communicate the assembly procedures, design assumptions and responses, to the extent that the design relies on or affects work by others, to the Engineer of Record – usually described in the manufacturer's erection drawings and assembly manuals. The manufacturer produces an engineered product but does not typically provide engineering services to the project.

In the context described, the Architect and Engineer of Record are the designers of the building and bear ultimate responsibility for the performance of the completed work. A buyer should be aware of the project professional distinctions when developing the project plan.

== See also ==
- Nissen hut
