= Eco-cement =

Construction material

Eco-Cement is a brand name for a type of cement which incorporates reactive magnesium oxide, another hydraulic cement such as Portland cement, and optionally pozzolans and industrial byproducts, to reduce the environmental impact of cement production. One problem with the commercialization of this cement, other than the conservatism of the building industry, is that the feedstock magnesite is rarely mined.

== Aspects ==
=== Energy requirements ===
Ordinary Portland cement requires a kiln temperature of around 1450 °C. The reactive magnesia in Eco-Cement requires a lower kiln temperature of 750 °C, which lowers the energy requirements, and thus carbon dioxide emissions even if fossil fuels are used.

=== Carbon dioxide sequestration ===
Eco-Cement sets and hardens by sequestering carbon dioxide from the atmosphere and is recyclable. The rate of absorption of carbon dioxide varies with the degree of porosity and the amount of magnesium oxide. Carbonation occurs quickly at first and more slowly towards completion. A typical Eco-Cement concrete block would be expected to fully carbonate within a year.

=== Waste utilization ===
Eco-Cement is able to incorporate a greater number of industrial waste products as aggregate than Portland cement as it is less alkaline. This reduces the incidence of alkali-aggregate reactions which cause damage to hardened concrete. Eco-Cement also has the ability to be almost fully recycled back into cement, should a concrete structure become obsolete.

== Types ==
=== Zero-carbon cement ===
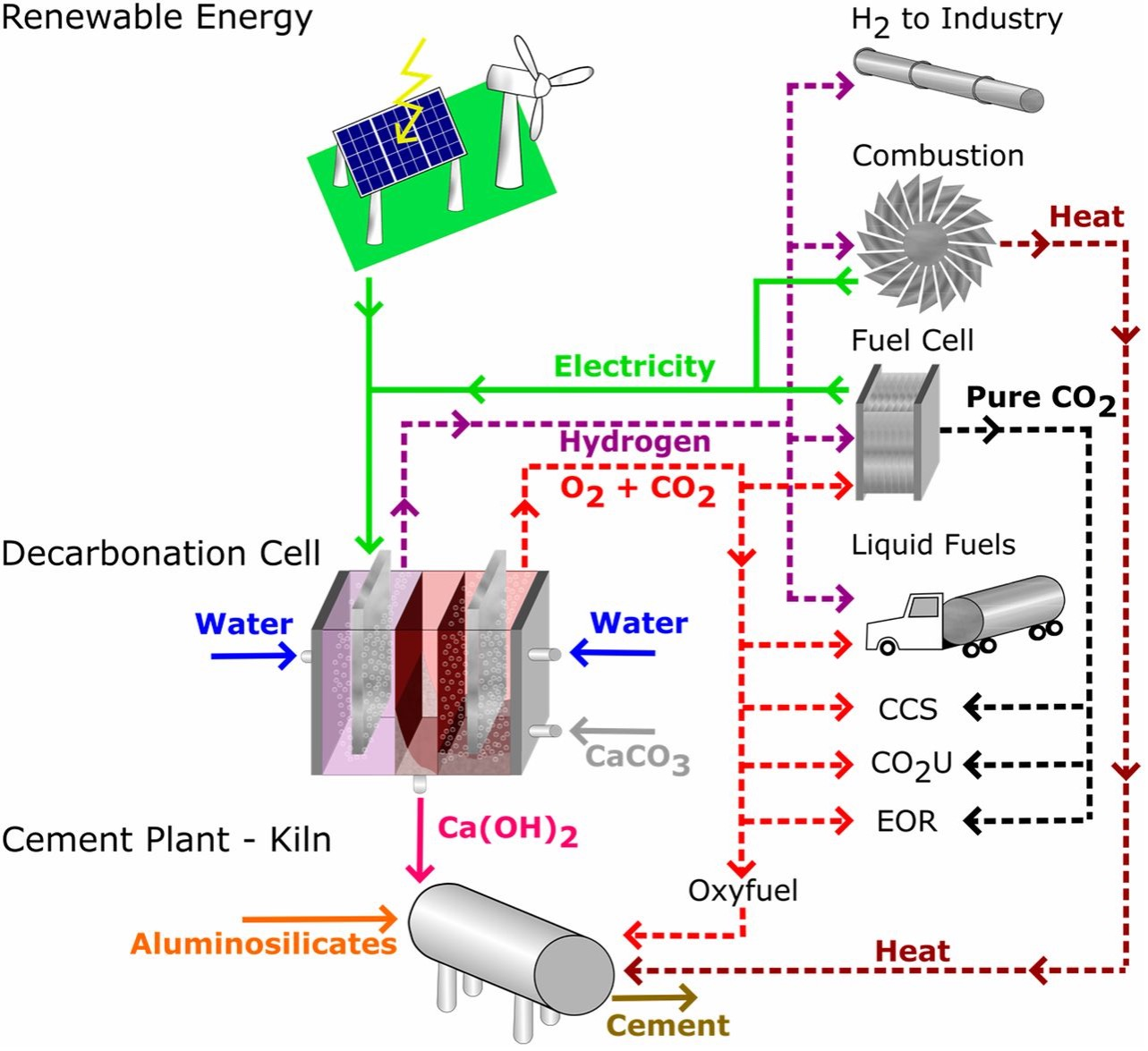
Scheme for a low-emission, electrochemically based cement plant

Researches at MIT have developed an alternative cement manufacturing process using renewable energy, which aims to reduce pollutant emissions. Crushed limestone is dissolved in acid at one electrode, releasing high-purity carbon dioxide, while calcium hydroxide precipitates at the other electrode, the overall reaction being

2 CaCO_{3} + 4 H_{2}O → 2 Ca(OH)_{2} + 2 H_{2} + O_{2} + 2 CO_{2}

Calcium hydroxide is then processed to produce cement, while the remaining high-purity gases can be easily captured. Carbon dioxide can be used to for value-added products, while hydrogen can be used for fuel, including powering the kiln. As a side benefit, hydrogen combustion results in reduced water consumption, as half the water used in the production of calcium hydroxide is recovered.

=== Rechargeable concrete battery ===
A research team from Chalmers University of Technology in Sweden has developed a working prototype of a concrete-based rechargeable battery, which could allow the use of buildings for energy storage. They based the design on what is called an Edison or nickel–iron battery, using nickel(III) oxide-hydroxide for positive plates, iron for negative plates, and replacing potassium hydroxide with conductive carbon fibers to act as the electrolyte. In addition, the researchers identified the following metals are suitable for rechargeable concrete batteries. Iron and zinc can be used as anode materials. Both materials will be reduced during charging and oxidized during discharging. The cell half-reactions of iron and zinc are the following:

Fe(OH)_{2} + 2 e^{−} → Fe + 2 OH^{−} (E_{0}= −0.89 V)
Zn(OH)^{2−}_{4} + 2 e^{−} → Zn + 4 OH^{−} (E_{0}= −1.2 V)

Nickel-based oxides can be used as anode materials, the half-reaction being:

NiOOH + H_{2}O + e^{−} → Ni(OH)_{2} + OH^{−} (E_{0}= +0.52 V)

This device has been proven capable of charging and discharging. In order to become competitive with commercial batteries however, concrete batteries need to overcome issues with comparatively lower battery life and energy density.

=== Thermoelectric energy harvesting using cement-based composites ===
The thermoelectric effect is a phenomenon in which the electrons (holes) in the heated object move from the high temperature area to the low temperature area by the temperature gradient. Equipment based on thermoelectric materials does not emit carbon dioxide during operation. Thus, extensive use of thermoelectric-based cement structures is a reliable way to solve environmental problems. Thermoelectric-based cement structures can harvest energy from the temperature difference between the outdoor and indoor surfaces of the cement structure in the building.

Generally, cement exhibits slight electron movements because of the presence of n-type conductivity. Therefore, with the addition of p-type conductive admixtures, hole movements are present, which eventually develops electron–hole distribution in cement composites. Thus, a voltage difference is attained and TEP is generated. The conductivity of the cement-based matrix can be enhanced even when admixtures are added below the percolation threshold. The admixtures currently reported that can be used to enhance the thermoelectric properties of cement composites include: carbon fiber-reinforced concrete, steel fiber composites and metallic oxide composites.
