= Marine biology =

Scientific study of ocean life

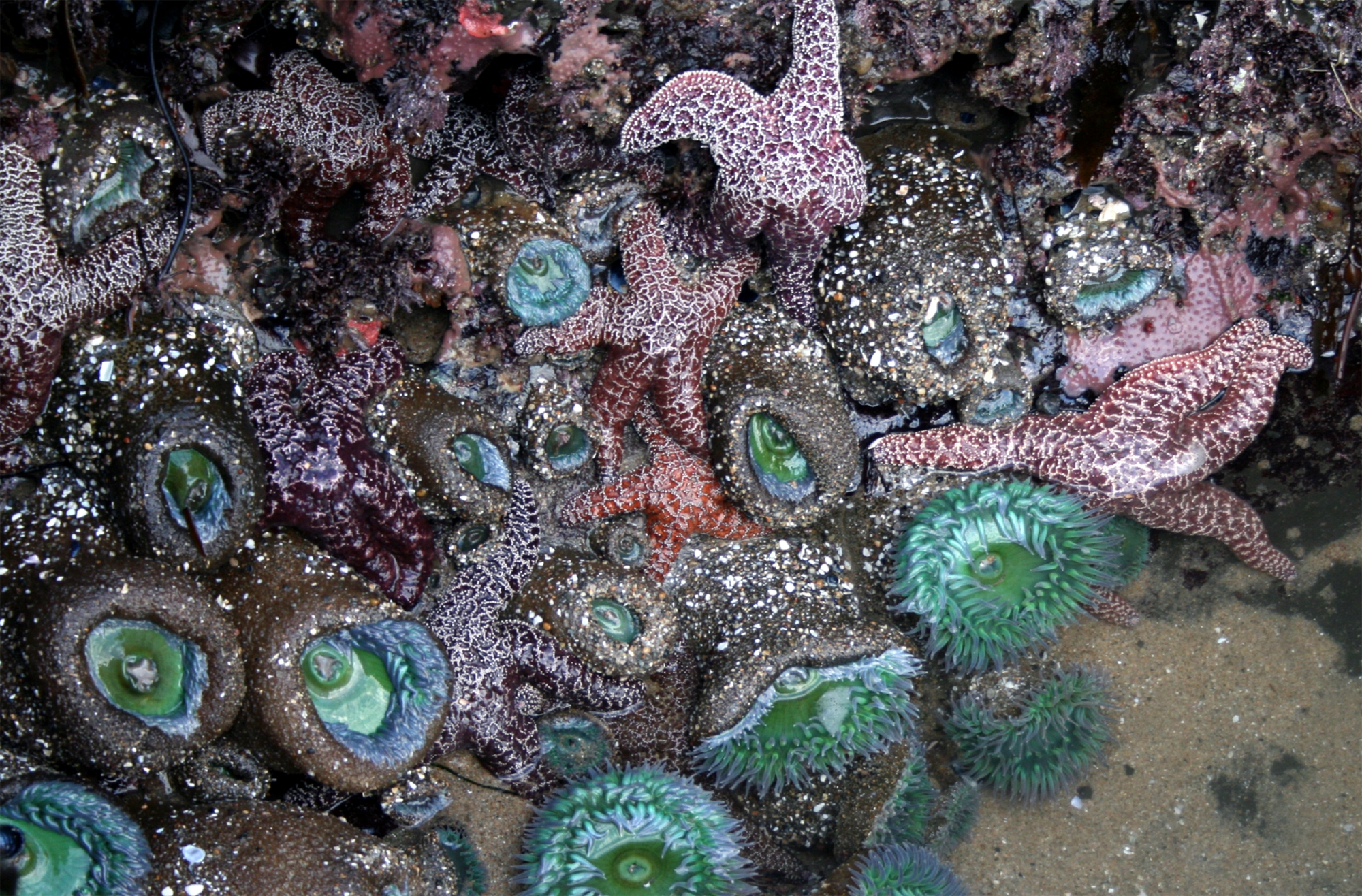
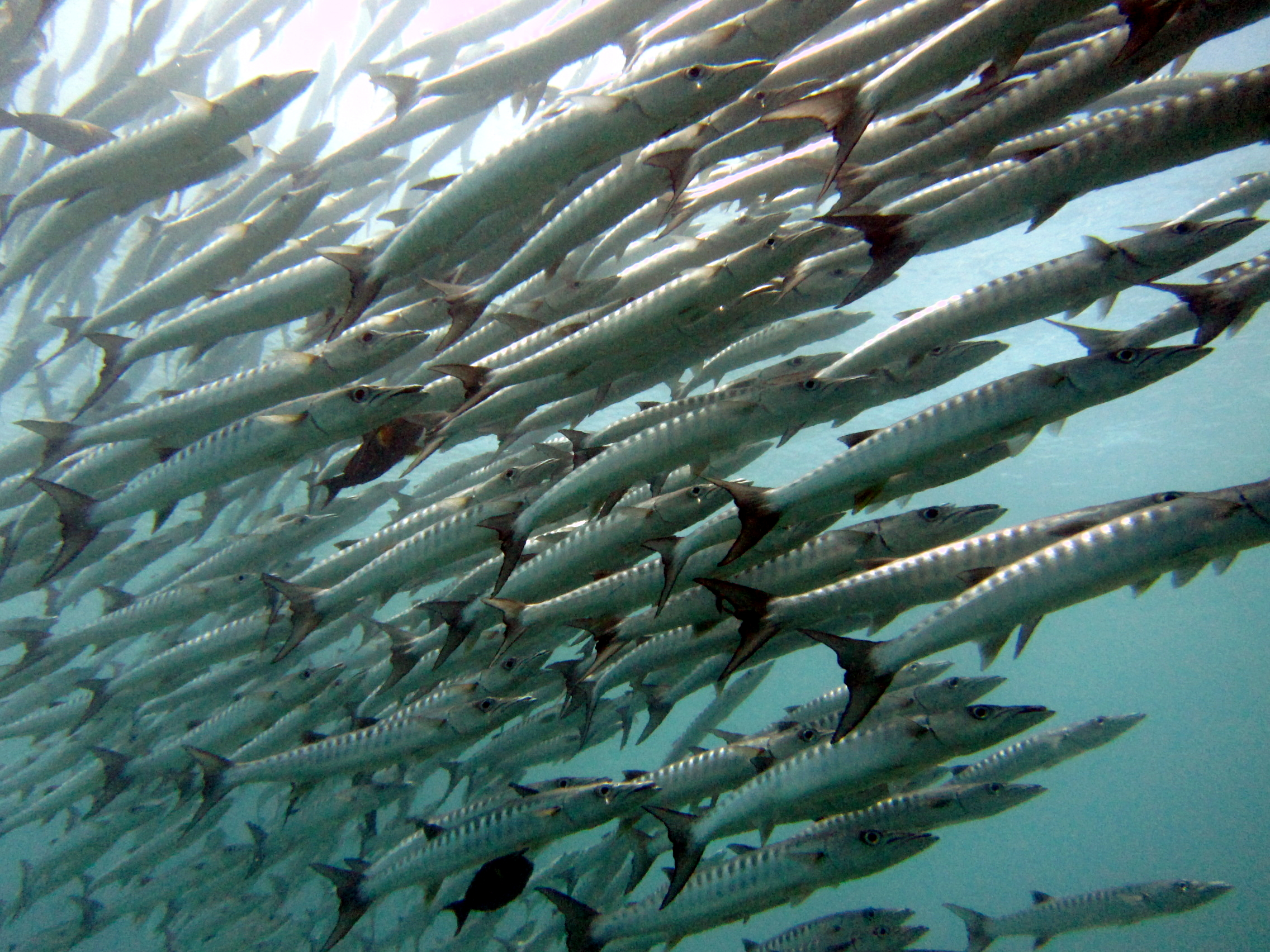
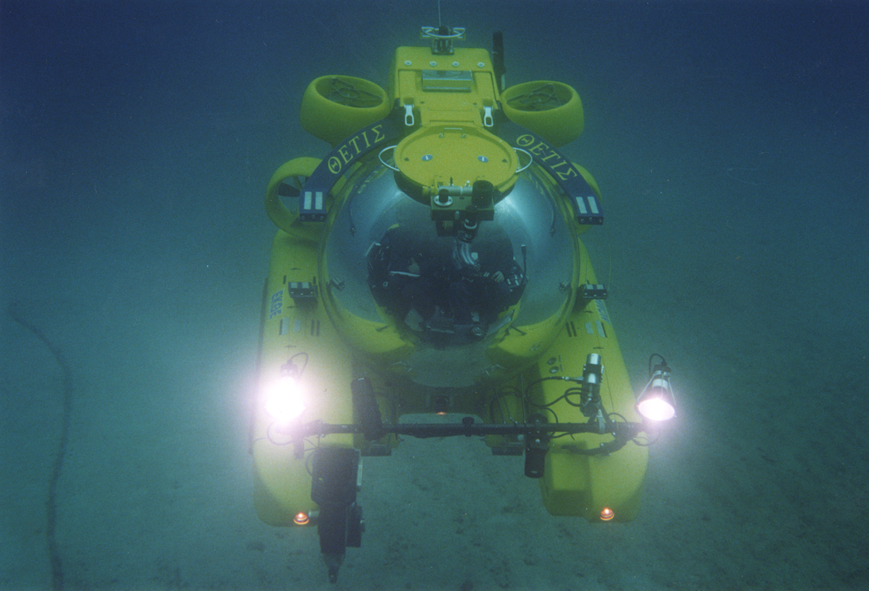
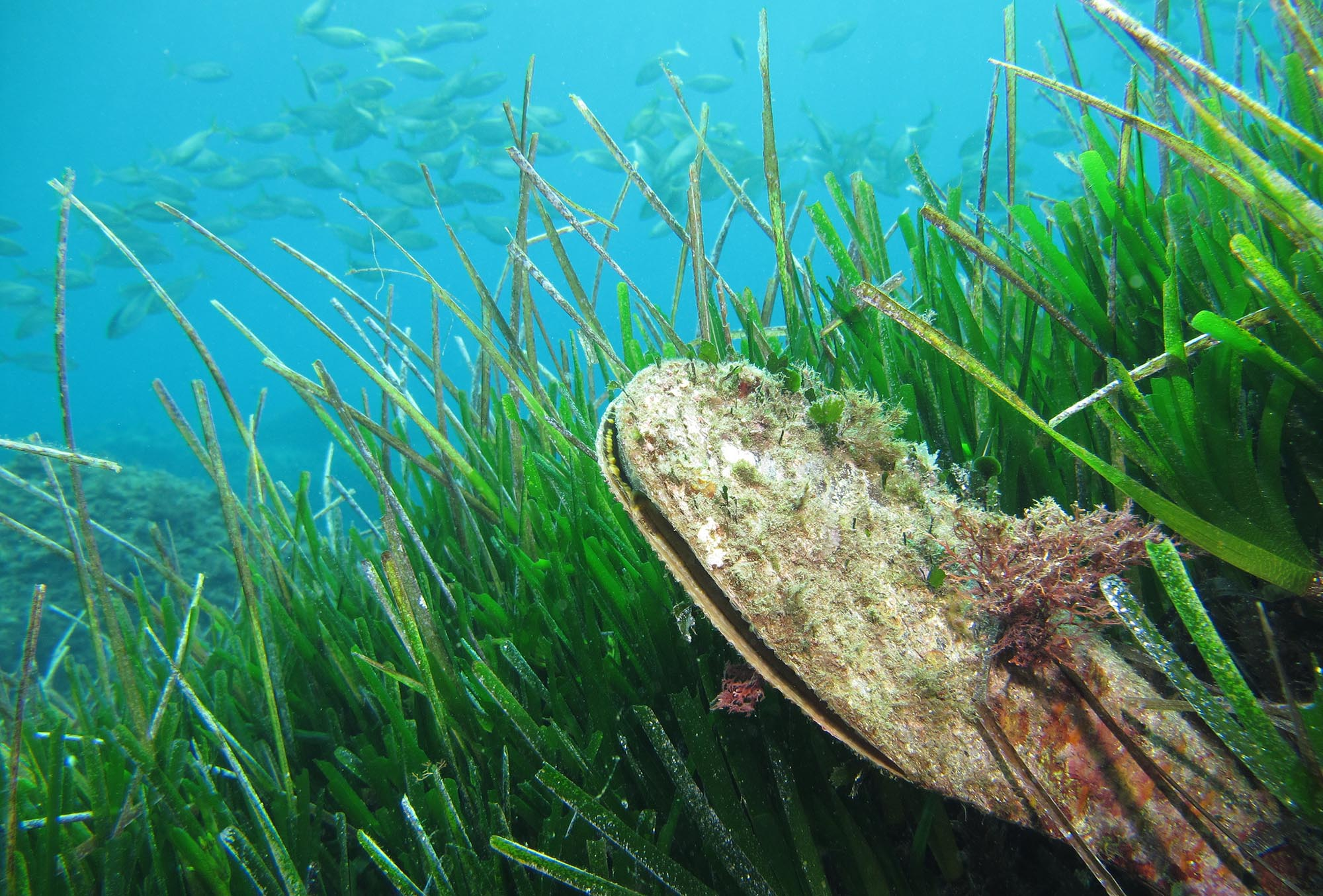
Marine biology studies species (marine life) that live in marine habitats (coastal and open ocean habitats). Clockwise from top left: Tide pool in Santa Cruz, United States; School of barracuda at Pom Pom Island, Malaysia; Fan mussel in a Mediterranean seagrass meadow; Research submarine for marine research.

Marine biology is the scientific study of the biology of marine life, organisms that inhabit the sea. Given that in biology many phyla, families and genera have some species that live in the sea and others that live on land, marine biology classifies species based on the environment rather than on taxonomy.

A large proportion of all life on Earth lives in the ocean. The exact size of this "large proportion" is unknown, since many ocean species remain undiscovered. The ocean is a complex three-dimensional world, Covering approximately 71% of the Earth's surface. The habitats studied in marine biology include everything from the tiny layers of surface water in which organisms and abiotic items may be trapped in surface tension between the ocean and atmosphere, to the depths of the oceanic trenches, sometimes 10,000 meters or more beneath the surface of the ocean.

Specific habitats include estuaries, coral reefs, kelp forests, seagrass meadows, the surrounds of seamounts and thermal vents, tidepools, muddy, sandy and rocky bottoms, and the open ocean (pelagic) zone, where solid objects are rare and the surface of the water is the only visible boundary. The organisms studied range from microscopic phytoplankton and zooplankton to huge cetaceans (whales) 25–32 meters (82–105 feet) in length. Marine ecology is the study of how marine organisms interact with each other and the environment.

Marine life supports numerous ecosystem services, providing food, medicine, and raw materials, in addition to helping to support recreation and tourism all over the world. Additionally, marine organisms contribute significantly to the oxygen cycle, and are involved in the regulation of the Earth's climate. Shorelines are in part shaped and protected by marine life, and some marine organisms even help create new land.

Many species are economically important to humans, including both finfish and shellfish. It is also becoming understood that the well-being of marine organisms and other organisms are linked in fundamental ways. The human body of knowledge regarding the relationship between life in the sea and important cycles is rapidly growing, with discoveries being made nearly every day. These cycles include those of matter (such as the carbon cycle) and of air (such as Earth's respiration, and movement of energy through ecosystems including the ocean). Large areas beneath the ocean surface remain effectively unexplored.

== Biological oceanography ==
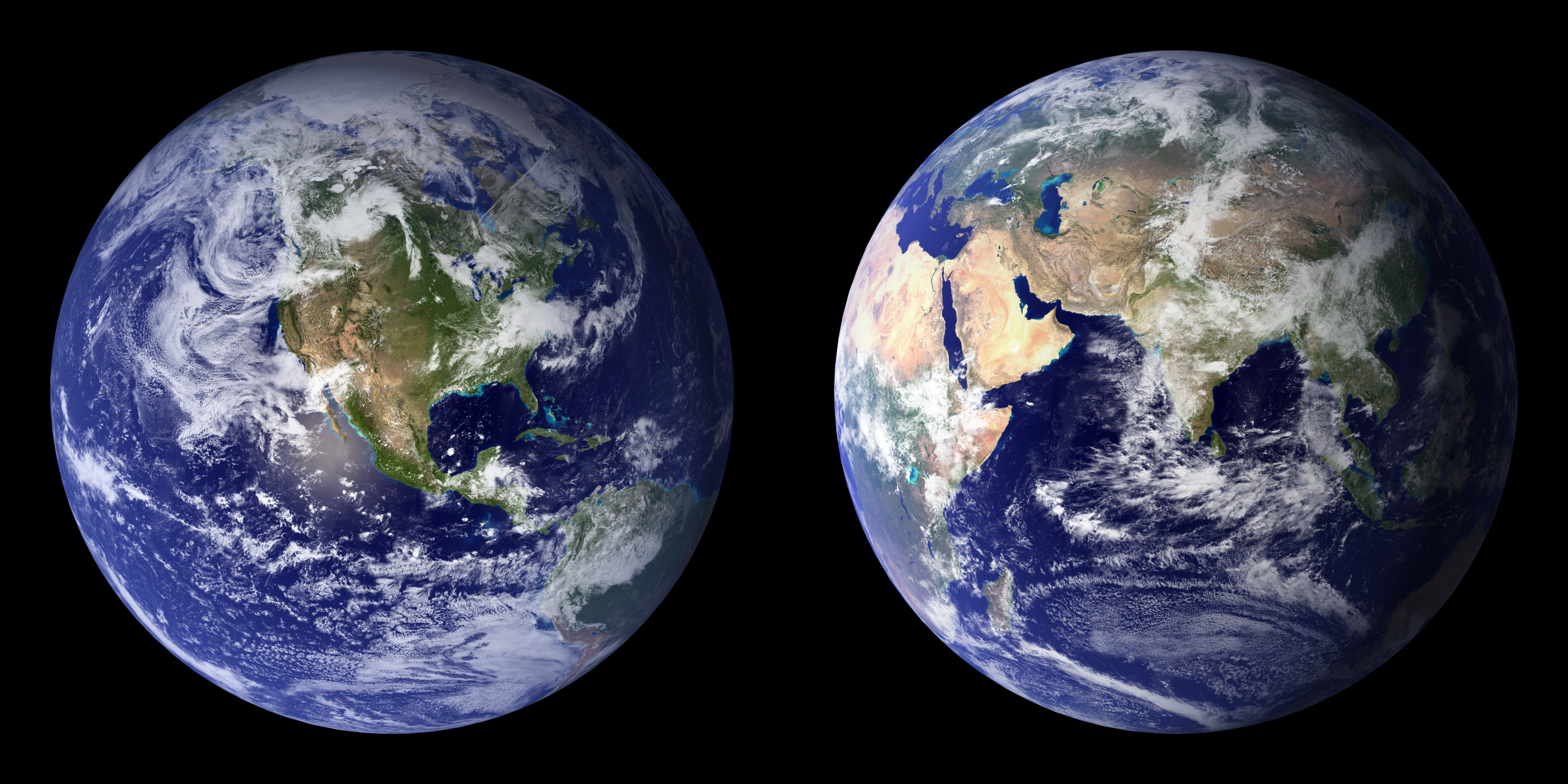
Marine biology studies species that live in marine habitats. Most of the Earth's surface is covered by ocean, which is the home to marine life. Oceans average nearly four kilometers in-depth and are fringed with coastlines that run for about 360,000 kilometres.

Marine biology can be contrasted with biological oceanography. Marine life is a field of study both in marine biology and in biological oceanography. Biological oceanography is the study of how organisms affect and are affected by the physics, chemistry, and geology of the oceanographic system. Biological oceanography mostly focuses on the microorganisms within the ocean, looking at how they are affected by their environment and how that affects larger marine creatures and their ecosystem.

Biological oceanography is similar to marine biology, but it studies ocean life from a different perspective. Biological oceanography takes a bottom-up approach in terms of the food web, while marine biology studies the ocean from a top-down perspective. Biological oceanography mainly focuses on the ecosystem of the ocean with an emphasis on plankton: their diversity (morphology, nutritional sources, motility, and metabolism); their productivity and how that plays a role in the global carbon cycle; and their distribution (predation and life cycle). Biological oceanography also investigates the role of microbes in food webs, and how humans impact the ecosystems in the oceans.

== Marine habitats ==
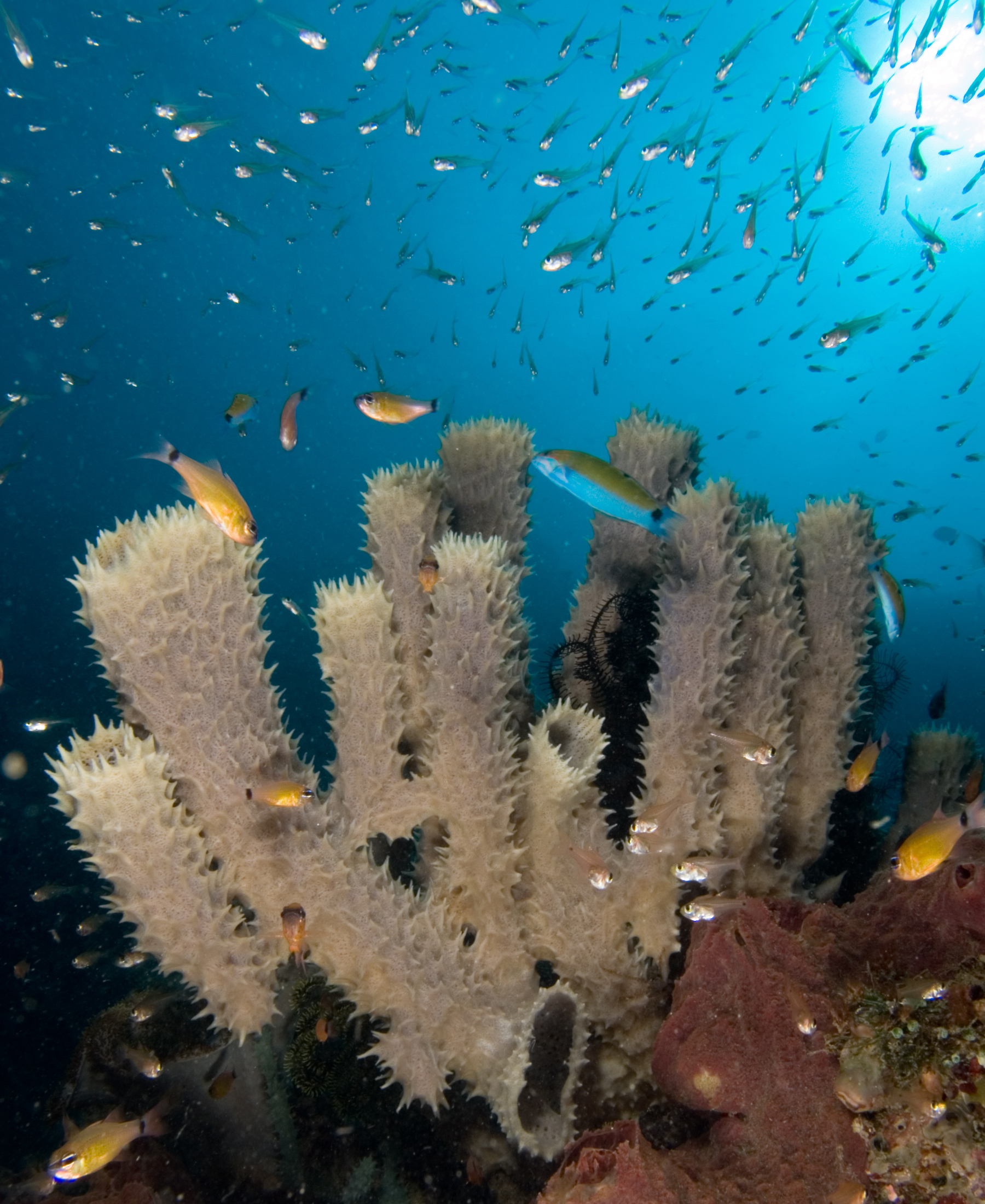
Coral reefs provide marine habitats for tube sponges, which in turn become marine habitats for fish

Marine habitats can be divided into coastal and open ocean habitats. Coastal habitats are found in the area that extends from the shoreline to the edge of the continental shelf. Most marine life is found in coastal habitats, even though the shelf area occupies only seven percent of the total ocean area. Open ocean habitats are found in the deep ocean beyond the edge of the continental shelf. Alternatively, marine habitats can be divided into pelagic and demersal habitats. Pelagic habitats are found near the surface or in the open water column, away from the bottom of the ocean and affected by ocean currents, while demersal habitats are near or on the bottom. Marine habitats can be modified by their inhabitants. Some marine organisms, like corals, kelp, and sea grasses, are ecosystem engineers which reshape the marine environment to the point where they create further habitat for other organisms.

=== Intertidal and near shore ===
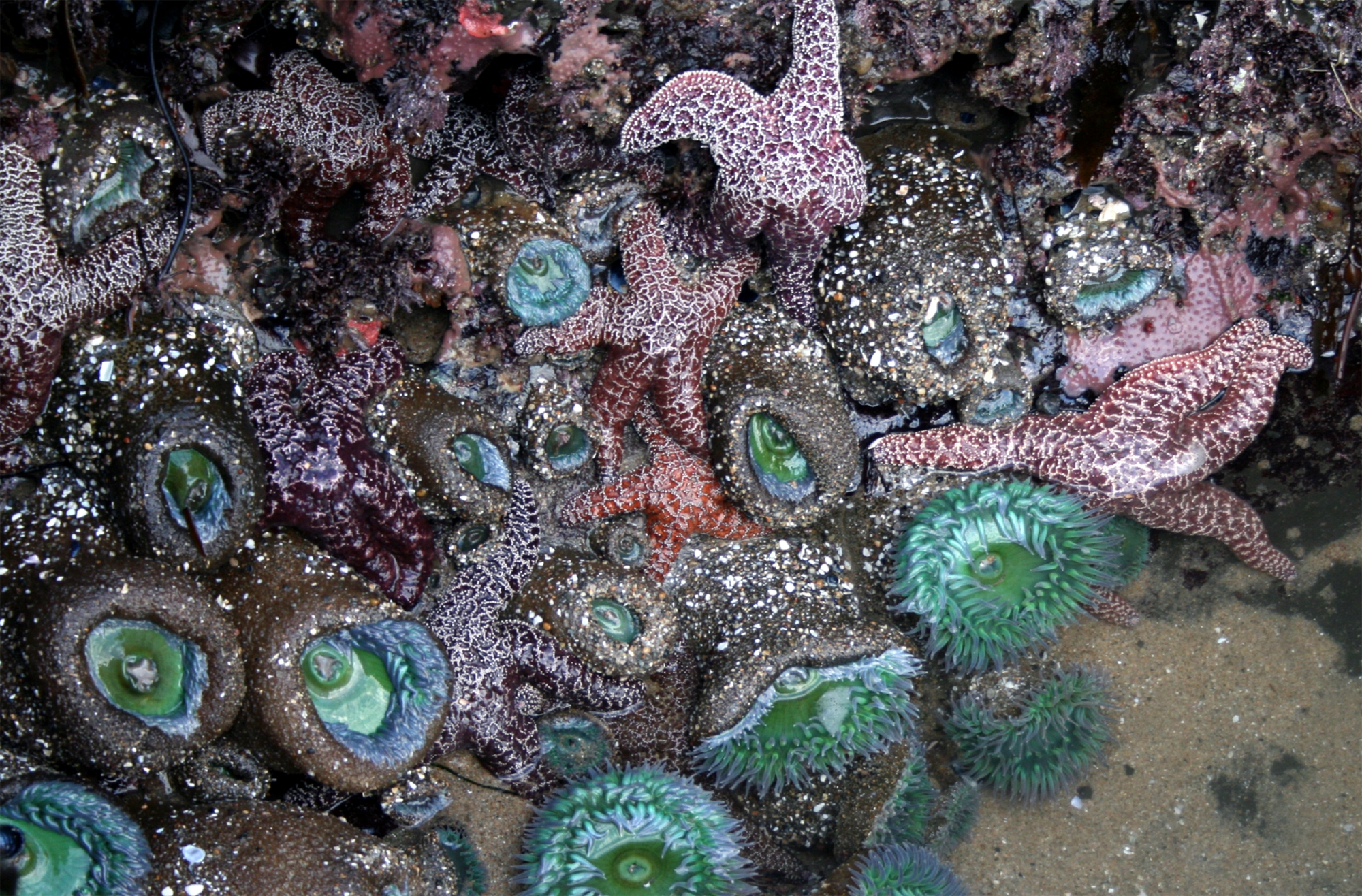
Tide pools with sea stars and sea anemone

Intertidal zones, the areas that are close to the shore, are constantly being exposed and covered by the ocean's tides. A huge array of life can be found within this zone. Shore habitats span from the upper intertidal zones to the area where land vegetation takes prominence. It can be underwater anywhere from daily to very infrequently. Many species here are scavengers, living off of sea life that is washed up on the shore. Many land animals also make much use of the shore and intertidal habitats. A subgroup of organisms in this habitat bores and grinds exposed rock through the process of bioerosion.

=== Estuaries ===
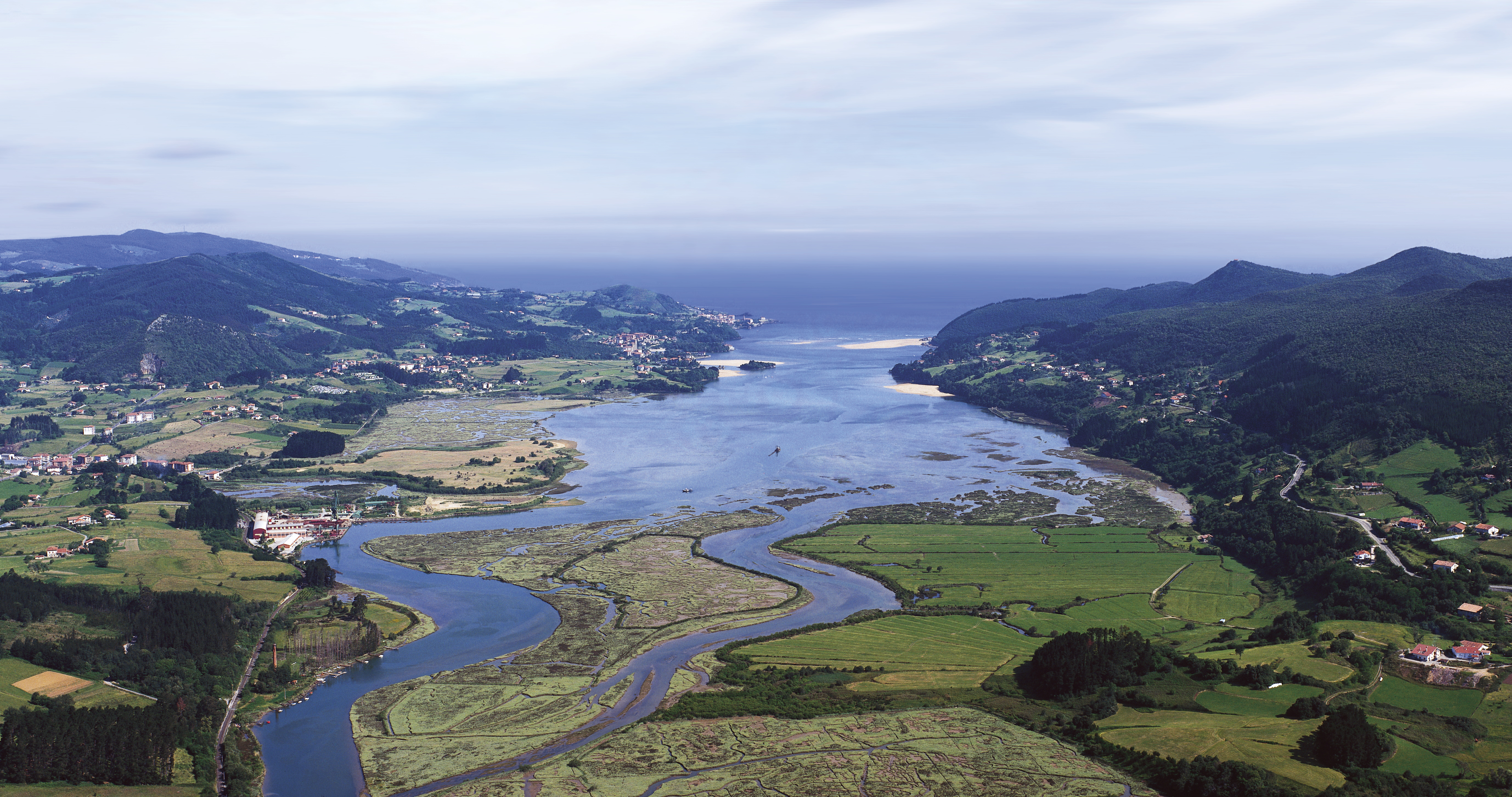
Estuaries have shifting flows of sea water and fresh water.

Estuaries are also near shore and influenced by the tides. An estuary is a partially enclosed coastal body of water with one or more rivers or streams flowing into it and with a free connection to the open sea. Estuaries form a transition zone between freshwater river environments and saltwater maritime environments. They are subject both to marine influences—such as tides, waves, and the influx of saline water—and to riverine influences—such as flows of fresh water and sediment. The shifting flows of both seawater and fresh water provide high levels of nutrients both in the water column and in sediment, making estuaries among the most productive natural habitats in the world.

=== Reefs ===
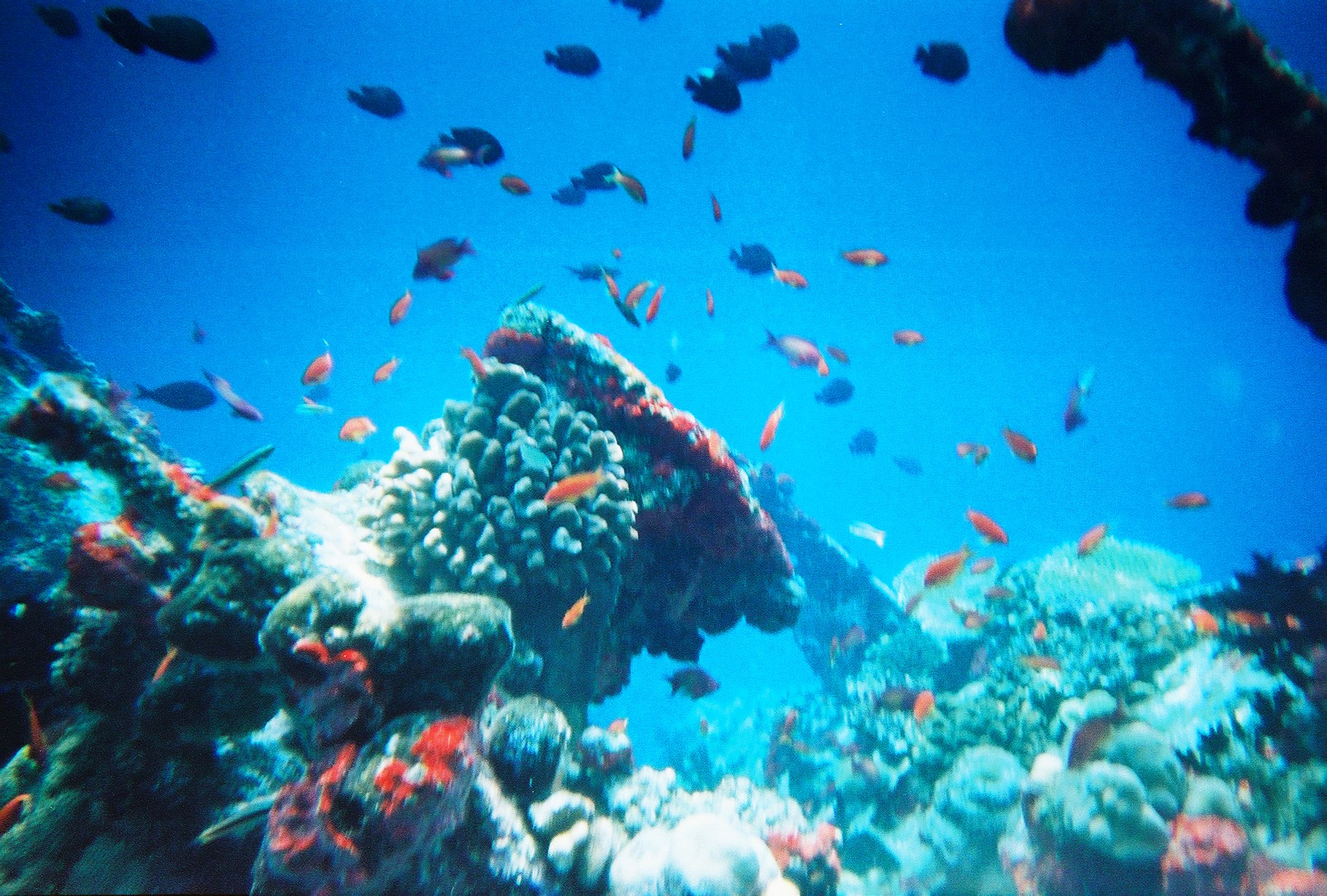
Coral reefs form complex marine ecosystems with tremendous biodiversity.

Reefs comprise some of the densest and most diverse habitats in the world. The best-known types of reefs are tropical coral reefs, which exist in most tropical waters; however, reefs can also exist in cold water. Reefs are built up by corals and other calcium-depositing animals, usually on top of a rocky outcrop on the ocean floor. Reefs can also grow on other surfaces, which has made it possible to create artificial reefs. Coral reefs also support a huge community of life, including the corals themselves, their symbiotic zooxanthellae, tropical fish, and many other organisms.

Much attention in marine biology is focused on coral reefs and the El Niño weather phenomenon. In 1998, coral reefs experienced the most severe mass bleaching events on record, when vast expanses of reefs across the world died because sea surface temperaturess rose well above normal. Some reefs are recovering, but scientists say that between 50% and 70% of the world's coral reefs are now endangered and predict that global warming could exacerbate this trend.

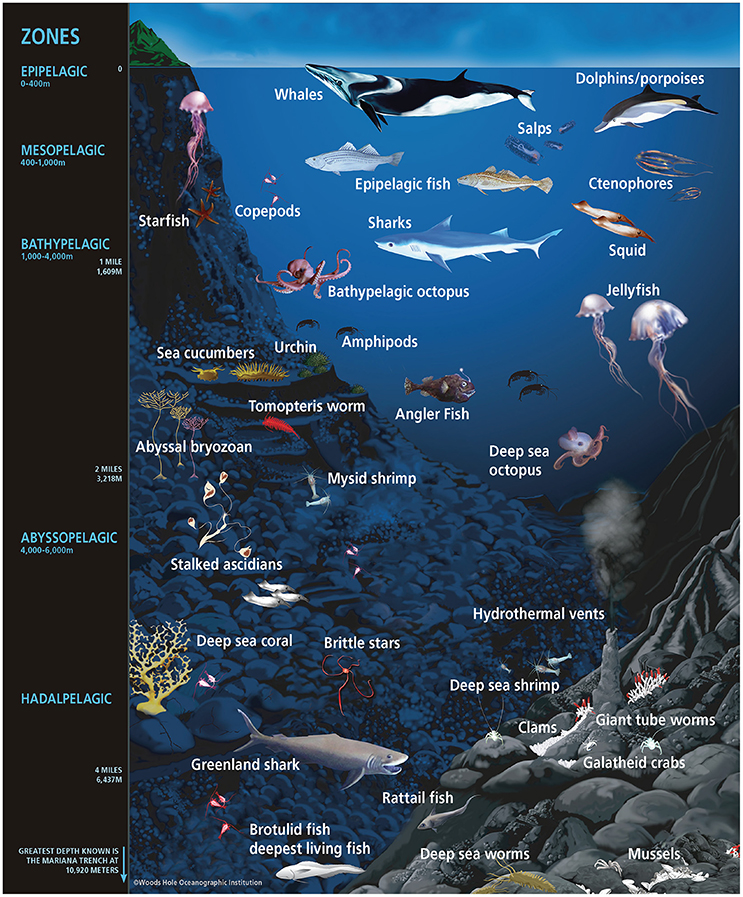
Some representative ocean animal life (not drawn to scale) within their approximate depth-defined ecological habitats. Marine microorganisms exist on the surfaces and within the tissues and organs of the diverse life inhabiting the ocean, across all ocean habitats.

=== Open ocean ===
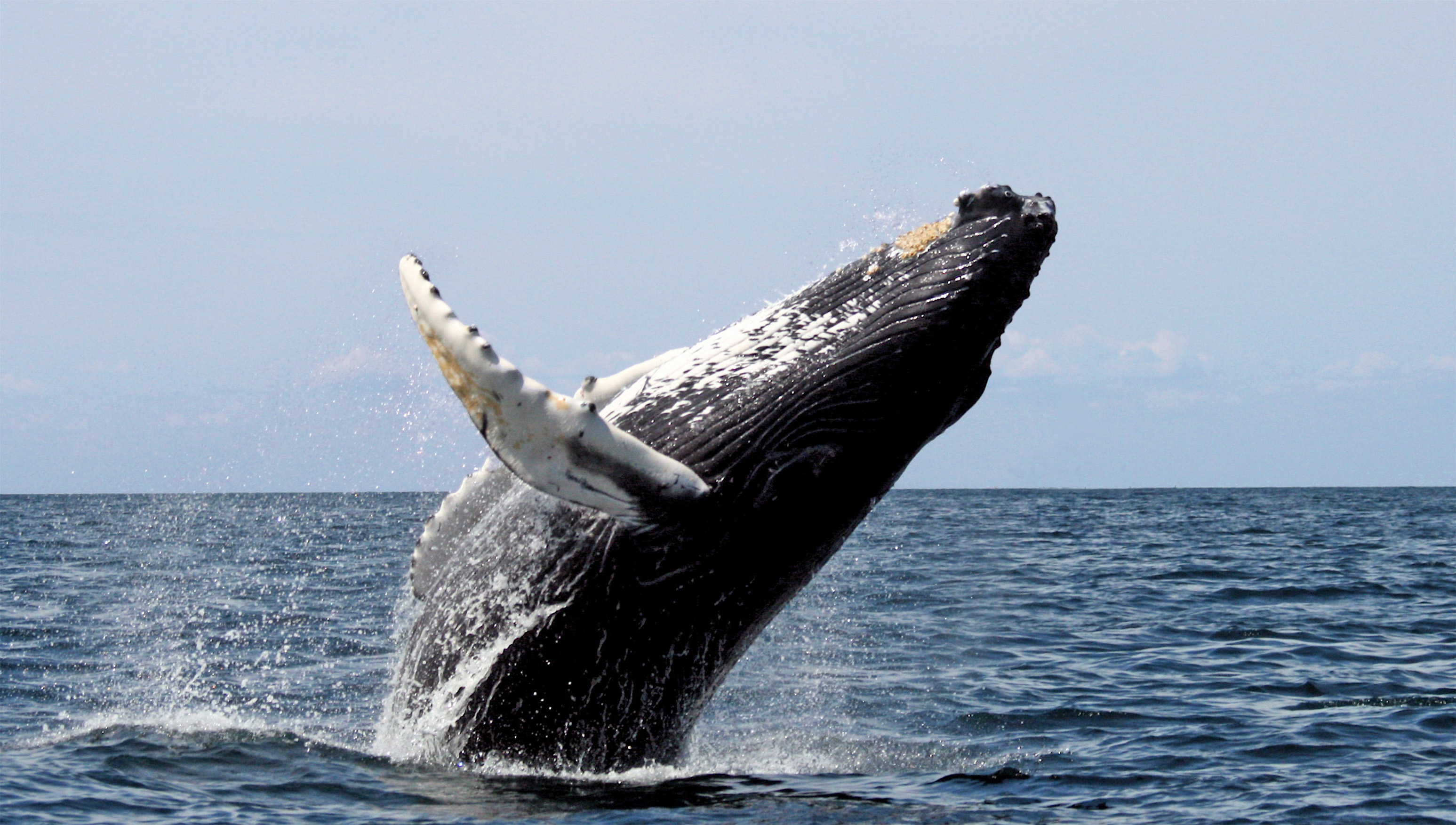
The open ocean is the area of deep sea beyond the continental shelves.

The open ocean is relatively unproductive because of a lack of nutrients, yet because it is so vast, in total it produces the most primary productivity. The open ocean is separated into different zones, and the different zones each have different ecologies. Zones which vary according to their depth include the epipelagic, mesopelagic, bathypelagic, abyssopelagic, and hadopelagic zones. Zones that vary by the amount of light they receive include the photic and aphotic zones. Much of the aphotic zone's energy is supplied by the open ocean in the form of detritus.

=== Deep sea and trenches ===
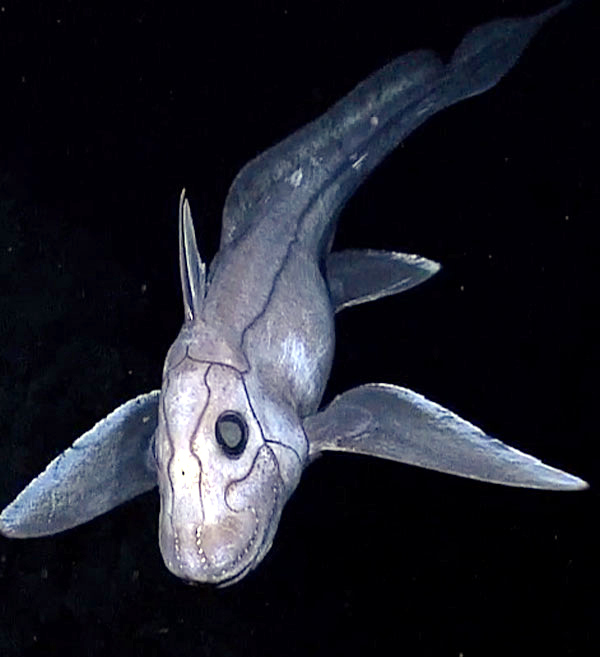
A deep-sea chimaera. Its snout is covered with tiny pores capable of detecting animals by perturbations in electric fields.

The deepest recorded oceanic trench measured to date is the Mariana Trench, near the Philippines, in the Pacific Ocean at 10,924 m (35,840 ft). At such depths, water pressure is extreme and there is no sunlight, but some life still exists. A white flatfish, a shrimp, and a jellyfish were seen by the crew of the bathyscaphe Trieste when it dove to the bottom in 1960, which led to scientific debate surrounding the likelihood of bony fish surviving in such deep waters. General scientific consensus has discredited the possible viewing of a flatfish at such depths.

In general, the deep sea is considered to start at the aphotic zone, the point where sunlight loses its power of transference through the water. Many life forms that live at these depths can create their own light known as bio-luminescence. Marine life also flourishes around seamounts that rise from the depths, where fish and other sea life congregate to spawn and feed. Hydrothermal vents along the mid-ocean ridge spreading centers act as oases, as do their opposites, cold seeps. Such places support unique biomes, and many new microbes and other lifeforms have been discovered at these locations. There is still much more to learn about the deeper parts of the ocean.

== Marine life ==
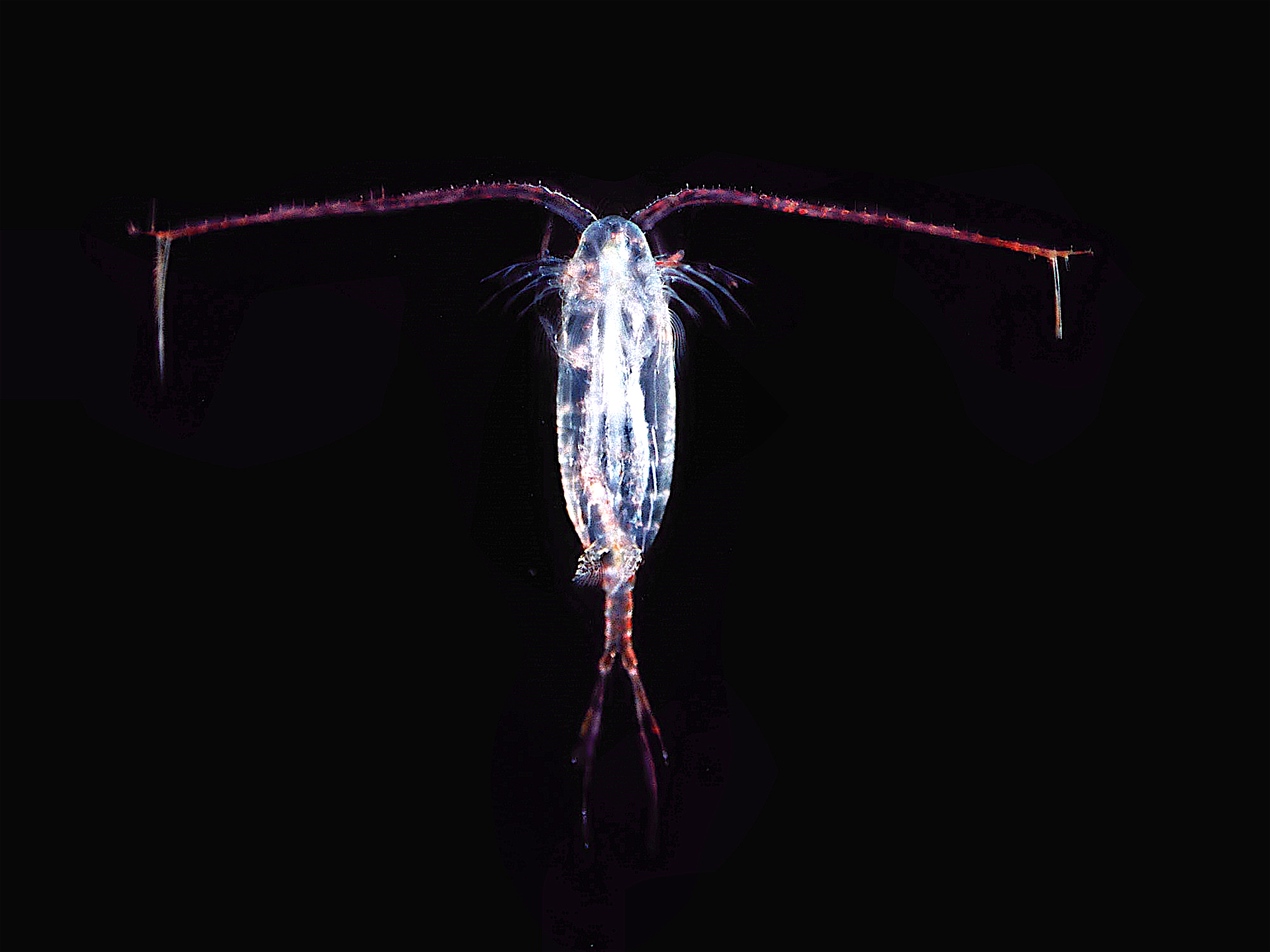
Copepod

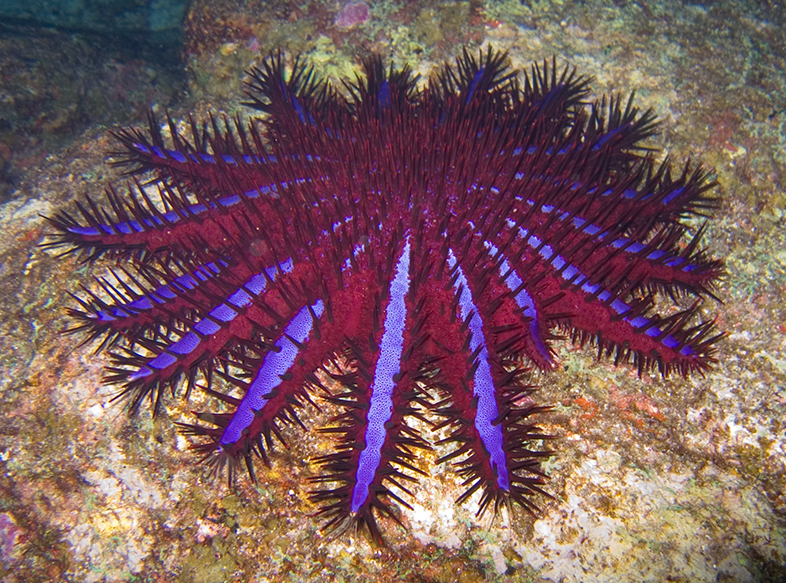
Crown-of-thorns starfish

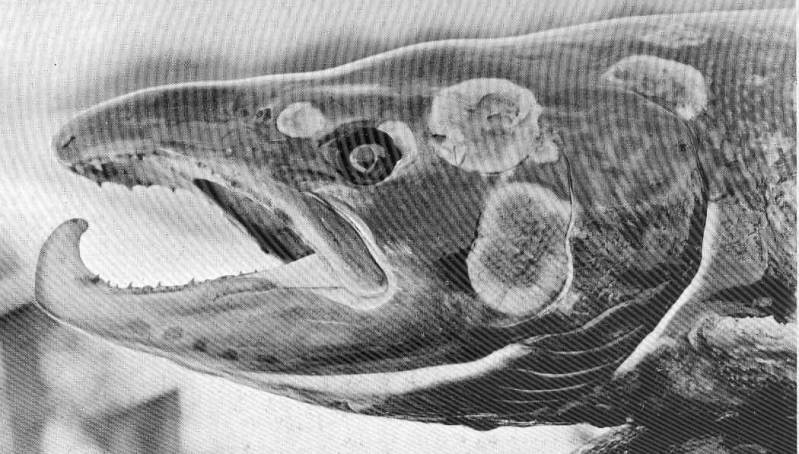
Mature salmon with fungal disease

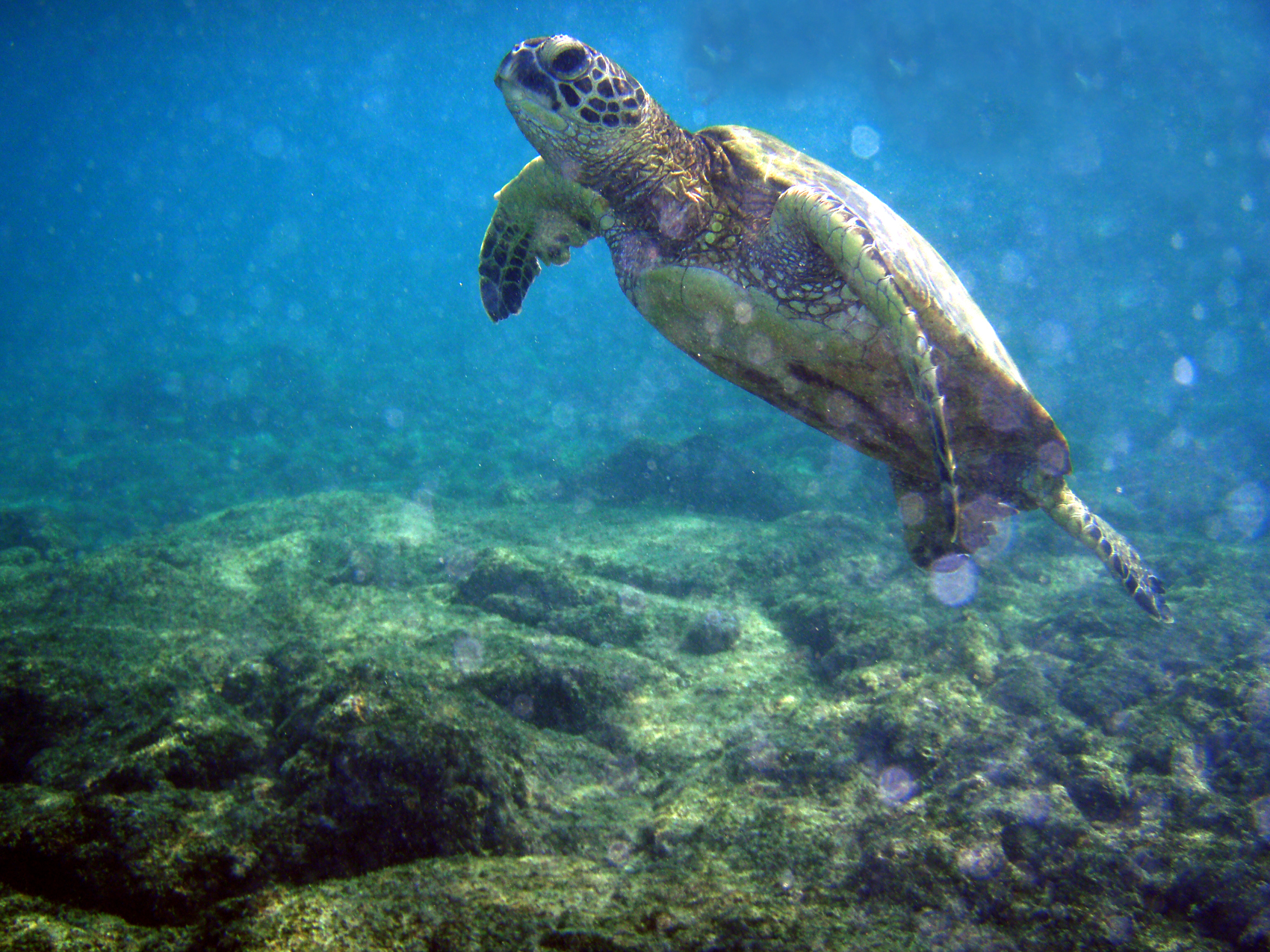
Green turtle

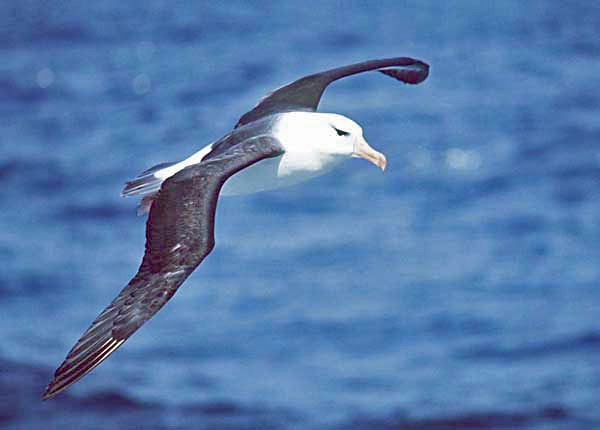
Albatross hovering over the ocean looking for prey

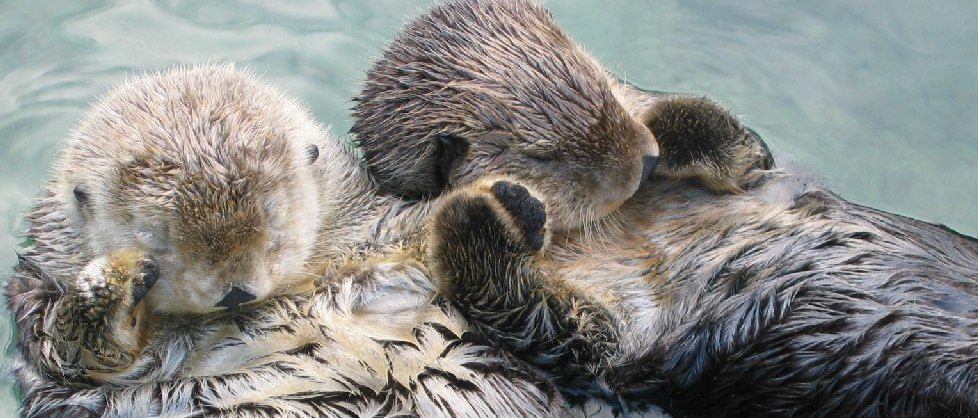
Sea otters

In biology, many phyla, families, and genera have some species that live in the sea and others that live on land. Marine biology classifies species based on their environment rather than their taxonomy. For this reason, marine biology encompasses not only organisms that live only in a marine environment, but also other organisms whose lives revolve around the sea.

=== Microscopic life ===
As inhabitants of the largest environment on Earth, microbial marine systems drive changes in every global system. Microbes are responsible for virtually all photosynthesis that occurs in the ocean, as well as the cycling of carbon, nitrogen, phosphorus, and other nutrients and trace elements.

Microscopic life undersea is incredibly diverse and still poorly understood. For example, the role of viruses in marine ecosystems is barely being explored even at the beginning of the 21st century.

The role of phytoplankton is better understood due to their critical position as the most numerous primary producers on Earth. Phytoplankton are categorized into cyanobacteria (also called blue-green algae/bacteria), various types of algae (red, green, brown, and yellow-green), diatoms, dinoflagellates, euglenoids, coccolithophorids, cryptomonads, chrysophytes, chlorophytes, prasinophytes, and silicoflagellates.

Zooplankton tend to be somewhat larger, and not all are microscopic. Many Protozoa are zooplankton, including dinoflagellates, zooflagellates, foraminiferans, and radiolarians. Some of these (such as dinoflagellates) are also phytoplankton; the distinction between plants and animals often breaks down in very small organisms. Other zooplankton include cnidarians, ctenophores, chaetognaths, molluscs, arthropods, urochordates, and annelids such as polychaetes. Many larger animals begin their life as zooplankton before they become large enough to take their familiar forms. Two examples are fish larvaee and sea stars (also called starfish).

=== Plants and algae ===
Microscopic algae and plants provide important habitats for life, sometimes acting as hiding places for larval forms of larger fish and foraging places for invertebrates.

Algal life is widespread and very diverse under the ocean. Microscopic photosynthetic algae contribute a larger proportion of the world's photosynthetic output than all the terrestrial forests combined. Most of the niche occupied by sub plants on land is actually occupied by macroscopic algae in the ocean, such as Sargassum and kelp, which are commonly known as seaweeds that create kelp forests.

Plants that survive in the sea are often found in shallow waters, such as the seagrasses (examples of which are eelgrass, Zostera, and turtle grass, Thalassia). These plants have adapted to the high salinity of the ocean environment. The intertidal zone is also a good place to find plant life in the sea, where mangroves or cordgrass or beach grass might grow.

=== Invertebrates ===
As on land, invertebrates, or animals that lack a backbone, make up a huge portion of all life in the sea. Invertebrate sea life includes Cnidaria such as jellyfish and sea anemones; Ctenophora; sea worms including the phyla Platyhelminthes, Nemertea, Annelida, Sipuncula, Echiura, Chaetognatha, and Phoronida; Mollusca including shellfish, squid, octopus; Arthropoda including Chelicerata and Crustacea; Porifera; Bryozoa; Echinodermata including starfish; and Urochordata including sea squirts or tunicates.

=== Fungi ===
Over 10,000 species of fungi are known from marine environments. These are parasitic on marine algae or animals, or are saprobes on algae, corals, protozoan cysts, sea grasses, wood and other substrata, and can also be found in sea foam. Spores of many species have special appendages which facilitate attachment to the substratum. A very diverse range of unusual secondary metabolites is produced by marine fungi.

=== Vertebrates ===
==== Fish ====
A reported 33,400 species of fish, including bony and cartilaginous fish, had been described by 2016, more than all other vertebrates combined. About 60% of fish species live in saltwater.

==== Reptiles ====
Reptiles which inhabit or frequent the sea include sea turtles, sea snakes, terrapins, the marine iguana, and the saltwater crocodile. Most extant marine reptiles, except for some sea snakes, are oviparous and need to return to land to lay their eggs. Thus, most species, excluding sea turtles, spend most of their lives on or near land rather than in the ocean. Despite their marine adaptations, most sea snakes prefer shallow waters near land, around islands, especially waters that are somewhat sheltered, as well as near estuaries. Some extinct marine reptiles, such as ichthyosaurs, evolved to be viviparous and had no requirement to return to land.

==== Birds ====
Birds adapted to living in the marine environment are often called seabirds. Examples include albatross, penguins, gannets, and auks. Although they spend most of their lives in the ocean, species such as gulls can often be found thousands of miles inland.

==== Mammals ====
There are five main types of marine mammals: cetaceans (toothed whales and baleen whales); sirenians such as manatees; pinnipeds including seals and the walrus; sea otters; and the polar bear. All are air-breathing, meaning that while some, such as the sperm whale, can dive for prolonged periods, all must return to the surface to breathe.

== Subfields ==
The marine ecosystem is large, and thus there are many subfields of marine biology. Most involve studying specializations of particular animal groups, such as phycology, invertebrate zoology and ichthyology. Other subfields study the physical effects of continual immersion in sea water and the ocean in general, adaptation to a salty environment, and the effects of changing various oceanic properties on marine life. A subfield of marine biology studies the relationships between oceans and ocean life, and global warming and environmental issues (such as carbon dioxide displacement). Recent marine biotechnology has focused largely on marine biomolecules, especially proteins, that may have uses in medicine or engineering. Marine environments are the home to many exotic biological materials that may inspire biomimetic materials.

Through constant monitoring of the ocean, there have been discoveries of marine life that could be used to create remedies for certain diseases such as cancer and leukemia. In addition, Ziconotide, an approved drug used to treat pain, was created from a snail that resides in the ocean.

=== Related fields ===
Marine biology is a branch of biology. It is closely linked to oceanography, especially biological oceanography, and may be regarded as a sub-field of marine science. It also encompasses many ideas from ecology. Fisheries science and marine conservation can be considered partial offshoots of marine biology (as well as environmental studies). Marine chemistry, physical oceanography and atmospheric sciences are also closely related to this field.

== Distribution factors ==
An active research topic in marine biology is to discover and map the life cycles of various species and where they spend their time. Technologies that aid in this discovery include pop-up satellite archival tags, acoustic tags, and a variety of other data loggers. Marine biologists study how the ocean currents, tides, and many other oceanic factors affect ocean life forms, including their growth, distribution, and well-being. This has only recently become technically feasible with advances in GPS and newer underwater visual devices.

Most ocean life breeds in specific places, nests in others, spends time as juveniles in still others, and in maturity in yet others. Scientists know little about where many species spend different parts of their life cycles, especially in the infant and juvenile years. For example, it is still largely unknown where juvenile sea turtles and some sharks in the first year of their life travel. Recent advances in underwater tracking devices are illuminating what we know about marine organisms that live at great ocean depths. The information that pop-up satellite archival tags gives aids in fishing closures for certain times of the year and the development of marine protected areas. This data is important to both scientists and fishermen because they are discovering that, by restricting commercial fishing in one small area, they can have a large impact on maintaining a healthy fish population in a much larger area.

== History ==
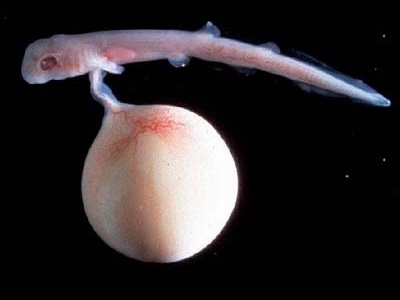
Aristotle recorded that the embryo of a dogfish was attached by a cord to a kind of placenta (the yolk sac).

The study of marine biology dates to Aristotle (384–322 BC), who made many observations of life in the sea around Lesbos, laying the foundation for many future discoveries. In 1768, Samuel Gottlieb Gmelin (1744–1774) published the Historia Fucorum, the first work dedicated to marine algae and the first book on marine biology to use the new binomial nomenclature of Linnaeus. It included elaborate illustrations of seaweed and marine algae on folded leaves. The British naturalist Edward Forbes (1815–1854) is generally regarded as the founder of the science of marine biology. The pace of oceanographic and marine biology studies quickly accelerated during the 19th century.

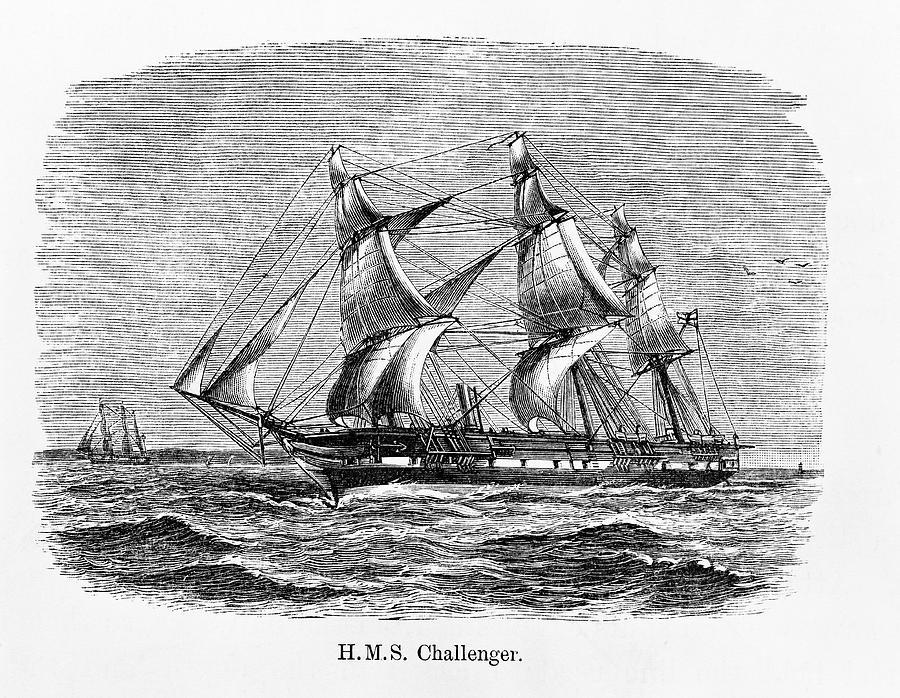
HMS Challenger during its pioneer expedition of 1872–1876

The observations made in the first studies of marine biology fueled the Age of Discovery and exploration that followed. During this time, a vast amount of knowledge was gained about the life that exists in the oceans of the world. Many voyages contributed significantly to this pool of knowledge. Among the most significant were the voyages of HMS Beagle, during which Charles Darwin came up with his theories of evolution and the formation of coral reefs. Another important expedition was undertaken by HMS Challenger, where findings were made of unexpectedly high species diversity among fauna stimulating much theorizing by population ecologists on how such varieties of life could be maintained in what was thought to be such a hostile environment. This era was important for the history of marine biology, but naturalists were still limited in their studies because they lacked technology that would allow them to adequately examine species that lived in deep parts of the oceans.

The creation of marine laboratories was important because it allowed marine biologists to conduct research and process their specimens from expeditions. The oldest marine laboratory in the world, Station biologique de Roscoff, was established in Concarneau, France, and founded by the College of France in 1859. In the United States, the Scripps Institution of Oceanography dates back to 1903, while the prominent Woods Hole Oceanographic Institute was founded in 1930. The development of technology such as sound navigation and ranging, scuba diving gear, submersibles and remotely operated vehicles allowed marine biologists to discover and explore life in deep oceans that was once thought to not exist. Public interest in the subject continued to develop in the post-war years with the publication of Rachel Carson's sea trilogy (1941–1955).

In 1960, the bathyscaphe Trieste descended the furthest point man had yet traveled, bottoming Challenger's Deep at 35,797 feet. The vessel was captained by Jacques Piccard and Don Walsh, whose discoveries while at the bottom of the ocean bolstered scientific discussion and interest about life in the hadal zone.

== See also ==
- Acoustic ecology
- Aquaculture
- Bathymetry
- Biological oceanography
- Effects of climate change on oceans
- Freshwater biology
- Marine habitat concrete
- Modular ocean model
- Oceanic basin
- Oceanic climate
- Phycology

== Further references ==
- Morrissey J and Sumich J (2011) Introduction to the Biology of Marine Life Jones & Bartlett Publishers. ISBN 9780763781606.
- Mladenov, Philip V., Marine Biology: A Very Short Introduction, 2nd edn (Oxford, 2020; online edn, Very Short Introductions online, Feb. 2020), http://dx.doi.org/10.1093/actrade/9780198841715.001.0001, accessed 21 Jun. 2020.
