= Types of concrete =

Building material consisting of aggregates cemented by a binder

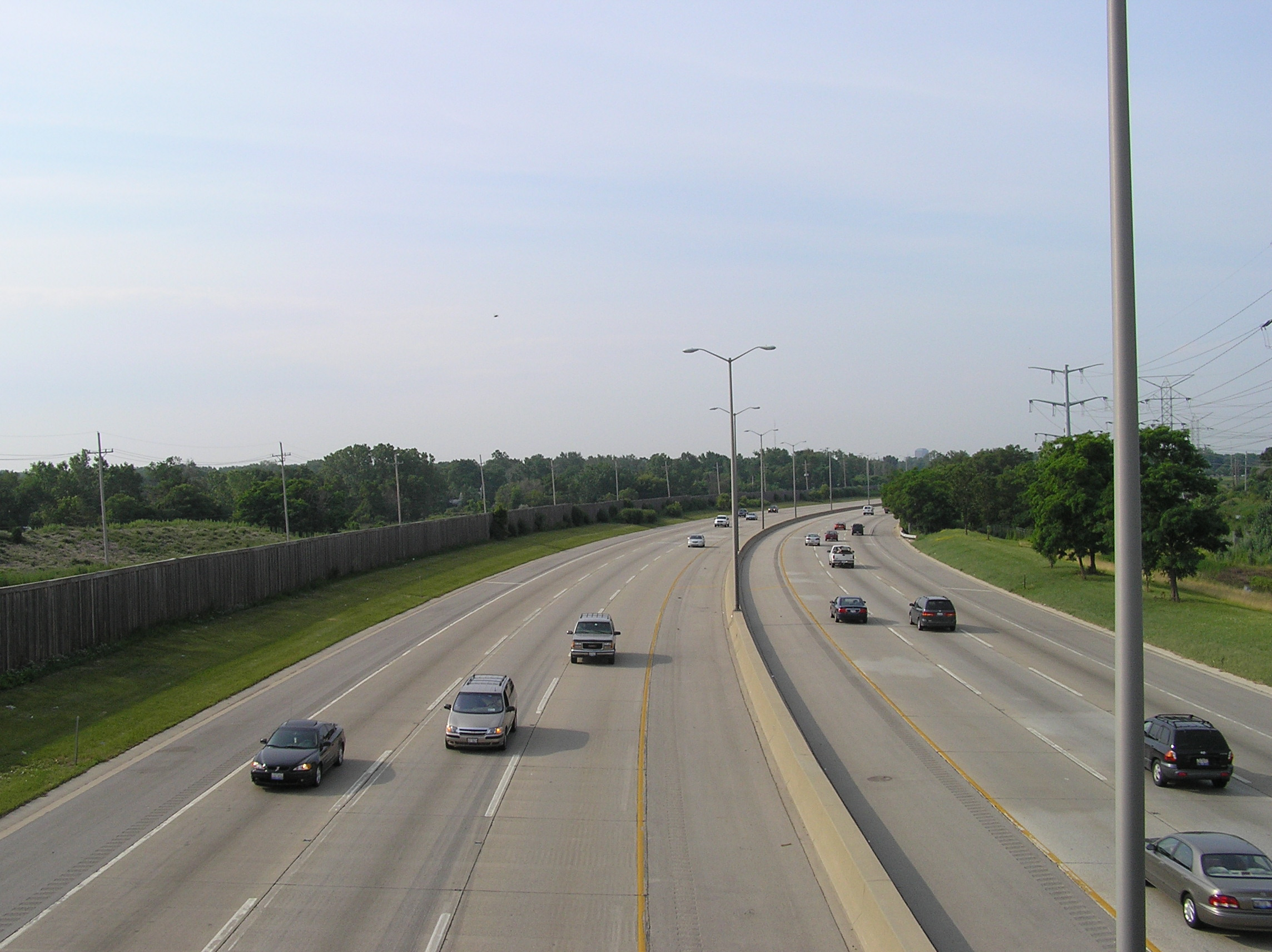
A highway paved with concrete

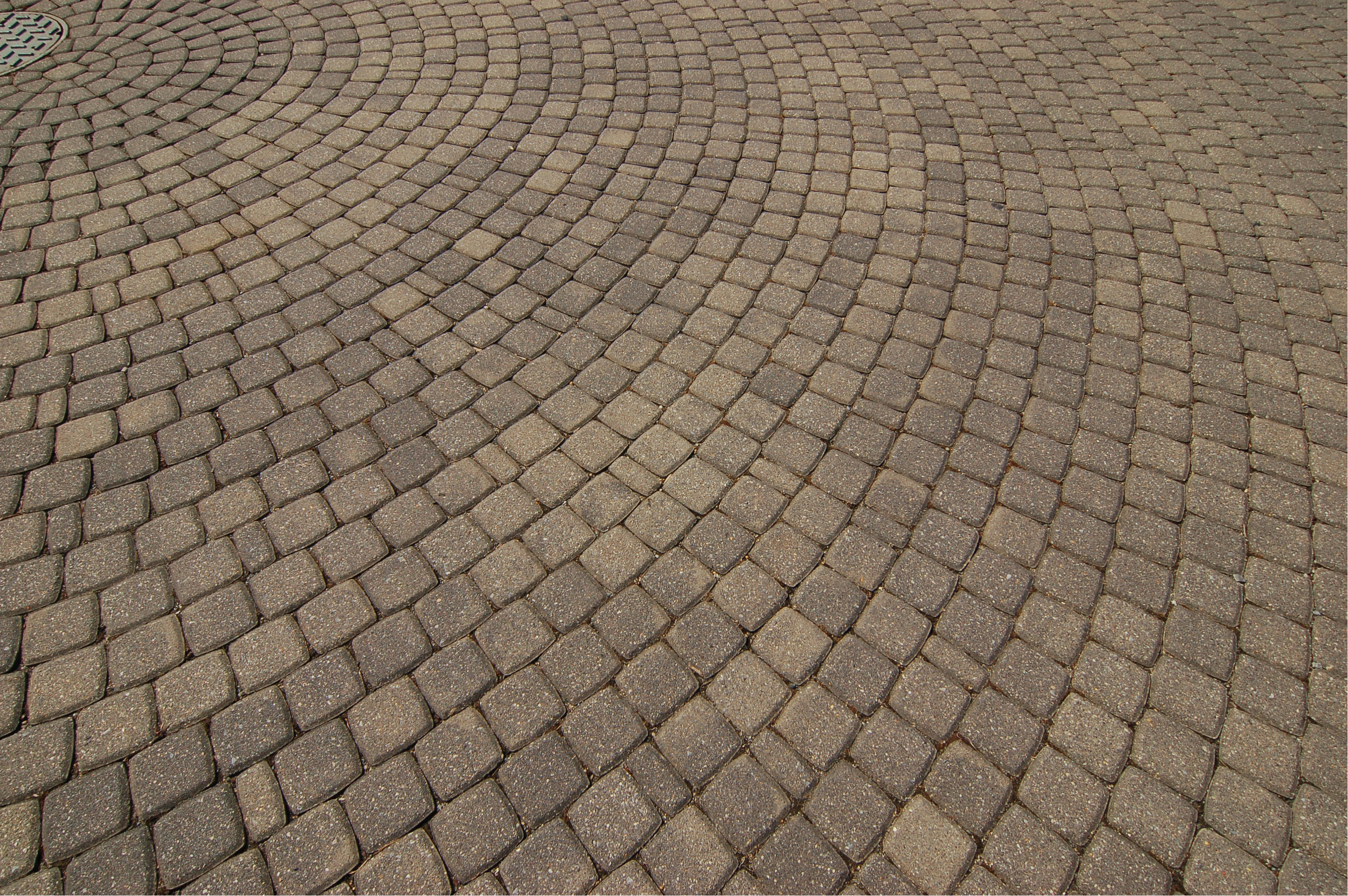
Modular concrete paving blocks

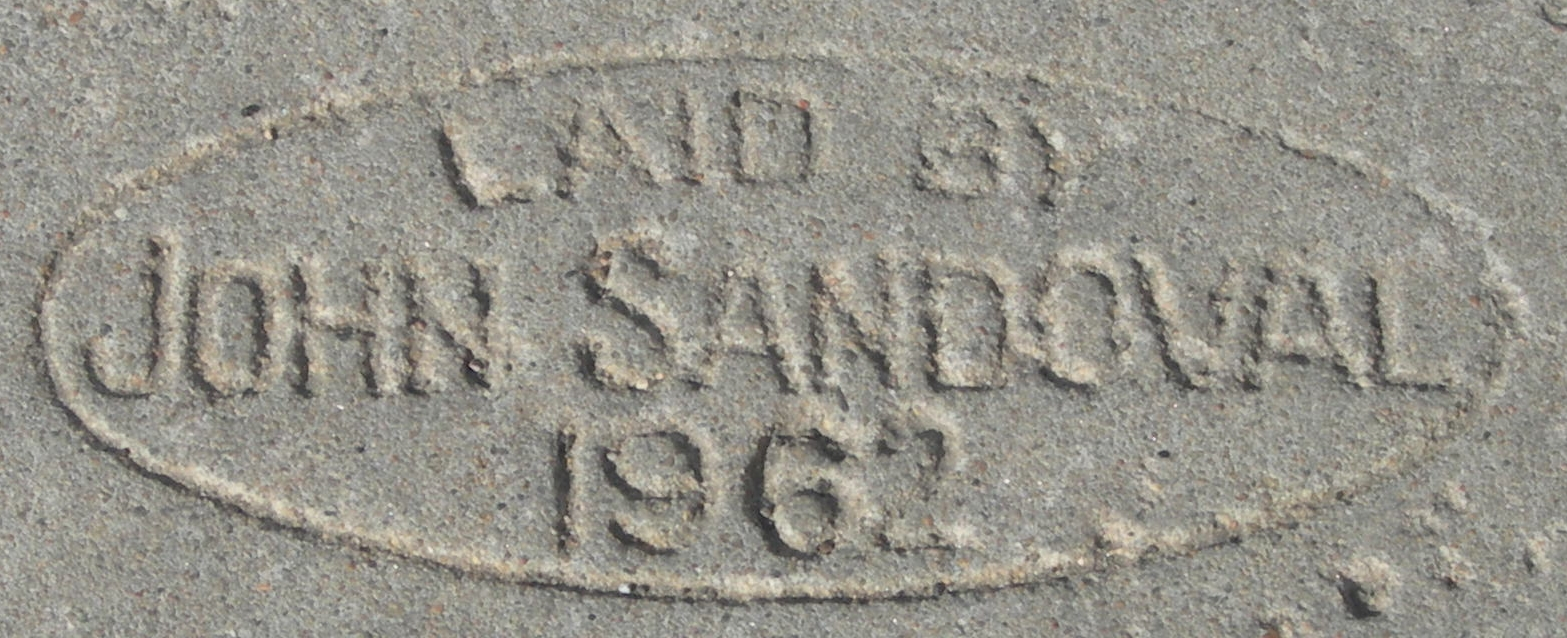
Concrete sidewalk stamped with contractor name and date of placement

Concrete is produced in a variety of compositions, finishes and performance characteristics to meet a wide range of needs.

== Mix design ==
Modern concrete mix designs can be complex. The choice of a concrete mix depends on the need of the project both in terms of strength and appearance and in relation to local legislation and building codes.

The design begins by determining the requirements of the concrete. These requirements take into consideration the weather conditions that the concrete will be exposed to in service, and the required design strength. The compressive strength of a concrete is determined by taking standard molded, standard-cured cylinder samples.

Many factors need to be taken into account, from the cost of the various additives and aggregates, to the trade offs between the "slump" for easy mixing and placement and ultimate performance.

A mix is then designed using cement (Portland or other cementitious material), coarse and fine aggregates, water and chemical admixtures. The method of mixing will also be specified, as well as conditions that it may be used in.

This allows a user of the concrete to be confident that the structure will perform properly.

Various types of concrete have been developed for specialist application and have become known by these names.

Concrete mixes can also be designed using software programs. Such software provides the user an opportunity to select their preferred method of mix design and enter the material data to arrive at proper mix designs.

== Historic concrete composition ==
Concrete has been used since ancient times. Regular Roman concrete for example was made from volcanic ash (pozzolana), and hydrated lime. Roman concrete was superior to other concrete recipes (for example, those consisting of only sand and lime) used by other cultures. Besides volcanic ash for making regular Roman concrete, brick dust can also be used. Besides regular Roman concrete, the Romans also invented hydraulic concrete, which they made from volcanic ash and clay.

Some types of concrete used to make garden sculptures and planters have been called composition stone or composite stone. There is no single precise formula that differentiates composition stone from other lime-cemented concretes, which is unsurprising because the term predates modern chemical science, being attested since at latest the 1790s. In the 19th and later centuries, the term artificial stone has encompassed various human-made stones including numerous cemented concretes.

== Modern concrete ==
Regular concrete is the lay term for concrete that is produced by following the mixing instructions that are commonly published on packets of cement, typically using sand or other common material as the aggregate, and often mixed in improvised containers. The ingredients in any particular mix depends on the nature of the application. Regular concrete can typically withstand a pressure from about 10 MPa (1450 psi) to 40 MPa (5800 psi), with lighter duty uses such as blinding concrete having a much lower MPa rating than structural concrete. Many types of pre-mixed concrete are available which include powdered cement mixed with an aggregate, needing only water.

Typically, a batch of concrete can be made by using 1 part Portland cement, 2 parts dry sand, 3 parts dry stone, 1/2 part water. The parts are in terms of weight – not volume. For example, 1-cubic-foot (0.028 m^{3}) of concrete would be made using 22 lb (10.0 kg) cement, 10 lb (4.5 kg) water, 41 lb (19 kg) dry sand, 70 lb (32 kg) dry stone (1/2" to 3/4" stone). This would make 1-cubic-foot (0.028 m^{3}) of concrete and would weigh about 143 lb (65 kg). The sand should be mortar or brick sand (washed and filtered if possible) and the stone should be washed if possible. Organic materials (leaves, twigs, etc.) should be removed from the sand and stone to ensure the highest strength.

== High-strength concrete ==
High-strength concrete has a compressive strength greater than 40 MPa (6000 psi). In the UK, BS EN 206-1 defines High strength concrete as concrete with a compressive strength class higher than C50/60. High-strength concrete is made by lowering the water-cement (W/C) ratio to 0.35 or lower. Often silica fume is added to prevent the formation of free calcium hydroxide crystals in the cement matrix, which might reduce the strength at the cement-aggregate bond.

Low W/C ratios and the use of silica fume make concrete mixes significantly less workable, which is particularly likely to be a problem in high-strength concrete applications where dense rebar cages are likely to be used. To compensate for the reduced workability, superplasticizers are commonly added to high-strength mixtures. Aggregate must be selected carefully for high-strength mixes, as weaker aggregates may not be strong enough to resist the loads imposed on the concrete and cause failure to start in the aggregate rather than in the matrix or at a void, as normally occurs in regular concrete.

In some applications of high-strength concrete the design criterion is the elastic modulus rather than the ultimate compressive strength.

== Stamped concrete ==
Stamped concrete is an architectural concrete that has a superior surface finish. After a concrete floor has been laid, floor hardeners (can be pigmented) are impregnated on the surface and a mold that may be textured to replicate a stone / brick or even wood is stamped on to give an attractive textured surface finish. After sufficient hardening, the surface is cleaned and generally sealed to provide protection. The wear resistance of stamped concrete is generally excellent and hence found in applications like parking lots, pavements, walkways etc.

== High-performance concrete ==
High-performance concrete (HPC) is a relatively new term for concrete that conforms to a set of standards above those of the most common applications, but not limited to strength. While all high-strength concrete is also high-performance, not all high-performance concrete is high-strength. Some examples of such standards currently used in relation to HPC are:

- Ease of placement – HPC can be consolidated adequately by gravity (self consolidating) and fills gaps between bars without vibration.
- Compaction without segregation
- Early age strength
- Long-term mechanical properties
- Permeability
- Density
- Heat of hydration
- Toughness
- Volume stability
- Long life in severe environments
- Depending on its implementation, environmental

HPC is concrete that develops a strength greater than 50 megapascals (7,300 psi) at 28, 56, or 90 days. These strengths generally require well-graded hard rock aggregates, a fairly high proportion of cement plus fly ash, water-reducing admixtures, and the silica fume, with relatively low water content. Extended mixing may be necessary to adequately disperse the silica fume, which is generally supplied in a granular format. The rich mixes may cause high heat of hydration in thick placements, which can be moderated by using a higher proportion of fly-ash, up to 30% of the cement content. Limestone powder may also be used to increase fluidity.

=== Ultra-high-performance concrete ===
Ultra-high-performance concrete is a new type of concrete that is being developed by agencies concerned with infrastructure protection. UHPC is characterized by being a steel fibre-reinforced cement composite material with compressive strengths in excess of 150 MPa, up to and possibly exceeding 250 MPa. UHPC is also characterized by its constituent material make-up: typically fine-grained sand, fumed silica, small steel fibers, and special blends of high-strength Portland cement. Note that there is no large aggregate. The current types in production (Ductal, Taktl, etc.) differ from normal concrete in compression by their strain hardening, followed by sudden brittle failure. Ongoing research into UHPC failure via tensile and shear failure is being conducted by multiple government agencies and universities around the world.

=== Micro-reinforced ultra-high-performance concrete ===
Micro-reinforced ultra-high-performance concrete is the next generation of UHPC. In addition to high compressive strength, durability and abrasion resistance of UHPC, micro-reinforced UHPC is characterized by extreme ductility, energy absorption and resistance to chemicals, water and temperature. The continuous, multi-layered, three dimensional micro-steel mesh exceeds UHPC in durability, ductility and strength. The performance of the discontinuous and scattered fibers in UHPC is relatively unpredictable. Micro-reinforced UHPC is used in blast, ballistic and earthquake resistant construction, structural and architectural overlays, and complex facades.

Ducon was the early developer of micro-reinforced UHPC, which has been used in the construction of new World Trade Center in New York.

== Low-density structural concrete ==
Ceramic aggregates with a density below that of water are used for low density structural concrete. These aggregates may include expanded clays and shales, preferably with water absorption below 10%. For structural concrete only coarse low density aggregates are used, with natural sand as the fine aggregates. However, lower percentages are used for moderate density concretes.

The concrete can develop high compressive and tensile strengths, while shrinkage and creep remain acceptable, but will generally be less rigid than conventional mixes. The most obvious advantage is the low density, but these concretes also have low permeability to water and greater thermal insulation. Resistance to abrasion by ice is similar to normal concrete. Disadvantages are that the water absorption by the aggregates may be relatively high, and vibrational consolidation can cause the low density aggregate to float. This can be avoided by minimising vibration and using fluid mixes. Low density has advantages for floating structures.

== Self-consolidating concrete ==
The defects in concrete in Japan were found to be mainly due to high water-cement ratio to increase workability. Poor compaction occurred mostly because of the need for speedy construction in the 1960s and 1970s. Hajime Okamura envisioned the need for concrete which is highly workable and does not rely on the mechanical force for compaction. During the 1980s, Okamura and his Ph.D. student Kazamasa Ozawa at the University of Tokyo developed self-compacting concrete (SCC) which was cohesive, but flowable and took the shape of the formwork without use of any mechanical compaction. SCC is known as self-consolidating concrete in the United States.

SCC is characterized by the following:

- extreme fluidity as measured by flow, typically between 650–750 mm on a flow table, rather than slump (height)
- no need for vibrators to compact the concrete
- easier placement
- no bleeding, or aggregate segregation
- increased liquid head pressure, which can be detrimental to safety and workmanship

SCC can save up to 50% in labor costs due to 80% faster pouring and reduced wear and tear on formwork.

In 2005, self-consolidating concretes accounted for 10–15% of concrete sales in some European countries. In the precast concrete industry in the U.S., SCC represents over 75% of concrete production. 38 departments of transportation in the US accept the use of SCC for road and bridge projects.

This emerging technology is made possible by the use of polycarboxylates plasticizer instead of older naphthalene-based polymers, and viscosity modifiers to address aggregate segregation.

== Vacuum concrete ==
Vacuum concrete, made by using steam to produce a vacuum inside a concrete mixing truck to release air bubbles inside the concrete, is being researched. The idea is that the steam displaces the air normally over the concrete. When the steam condenses into water it will create a low pressure over the concrete that will pull air from the concrete. This will make the concrete stronger due to there being less air in the mixture. A drawback is that the mixing has to be done in an airtight container.

The final strength of concrete is increased by about 25%. Vacuum concrete stiffens very rapidly so that the formworks can be removed within 30 minutes of casting even on columns of 20 ft. high. This is of considerable economic value, particularly in a precast factory as the forms can be reused at frequent intervals. The bond strength of vacuum concrete is about 20% higher. The surface of vacuum concrete is entirely free from pitting and the uppermost 1/16 inch is highly resistant to abrasion. These characteristics are of special importance in the construction of concrete structures which are to be in contact with flowing water at a high velocity. It bonds well to old concrete and can, therefore, be used for resurfacing road slabs and other repair work.

== Shotcrete ==
Shotcrete (also known by the trade name Gunite) uses compressed air to shoot concrete onto (or into) a frame or structure. The greatest advantage of the process is that shotcrete can be applied overhead or on vertical surfaces without formwork. It is often used for concrete repairs or placement on bridges, dams, pools, and on other applications where forming is costly or material handling and installation is difficult. Shotcrete is frequently used against vertical soil or rock surfaces, as it eliminates the need for formwork. It is sometimes used for rock support, especially in tunneling. Shotcrete is also used for applications where seepage is an issue to limit the amount of water entering a construction site due to a high water table or other subterranean sources. This type of concrete is often used as a quick fix for weathering for loose soil types in construction zones.

There are two application methods for shotcrete.

- dry-mix – the dry mixture of cement and aggregates is filled into the machine and conveyed with compressed air through the hoses. The water needed for the hydration is added at the nozzle.
- wet-mix – the mixes are prepared with all necessary water for hydration. The mixes are pumped through the hoses. At the nozzle compressed air is added for spraying.

For both methods additives such as accelerators and fiber reinforcement may be used.

== Limecrete ==
In limecrete, lime concrete or roman concrete the cement is replaced by lime. One successful formula was developed in the mid-1800s by Dr. John E. Park. Lime has been used since Roman times either as mass foundation concretes or as lightweight concretes using a variety of aggregates combined with a wide range of pozzolans (fired materials) that help to achieve increased strength and speed of set. Lime concrete was used to build monumental architecture during and after the roman concrete revolution as well as a wide variety of applications such as floors, vaults or domes. Over the last decade, there has been a renewed interest in using lime for these applications again.

Environmental Benefits

- Lime is burnt at a lower temperature than cement and so has an immediate energy saving of 20% (although kilns etc. are improving so figures do change). A standard lime mortar has about 60-70% of the embodied energy of a cement mortar. It is also considered to be more environmentally friendly because of its ability, through carbonation, to re-absorb its own weight in Carbon Dioxide (compensating for that given off during burning).
- Lime mortars allow other building components such as stone, wood and bricks to be reused and recycled because they can be easily cleaned of mortar and limewash.
- Lime enables other natural and sustainable products such as wood (including woodfibre, wood wool boards), hemp, straw etc. to be used because of its ability to control moisture (if cement were used, these buildings would compost).

Health Benefits

- Lime plaster is hygroscopic (literally means 'water seeking') which draws the moisture from the internal to the external environment, this helps to regulate humidity creating a more comfortable living environment as well as helping to control condensation and mould growth which have been shown to have links to allergies and asthmas.
- Lime plasters and limewash are non-toxic, therefore they do not contribute to indoor air pollution unlike some modern paints.

== Pervious concrete ==
Pervious concrete, used in permeable paving, contains a network of holes or voids, to allow air or water to move through the concrete

This allows water to drain naturally through it, and can both remove the normal surface-water drainage infrastructure, and allow replenishment of groundwater when conventional concrete does not.

It is formed by leaving out some or all of the fine aggregate (fines). The remaining large aggregate then is bound by a relatively small amount of Portland cement. When set, typically between 15% and 35% of the concrete volume is voids, allowing water to drain at a rate of 2 to 18 gal/ft²/min (81 to 730 L/m²/min) through the concrete.

=== Installation ===
Pervious concrete is installed by being poured into forms, then screeded off, to level (not smooth) the surface, then packed or tamped into place. Due to the low water content and air permeability, within 5–15 minutes of tamping, the concrete must be covered with a 6-mil poly plastic, or it will dry out prematurely and not properly hydrate and cure.

=== Characteristics ===
Pervious concrete can significantly reduce noise, by allowing air to be squeezed between vehicle tyres and the roadway to escape. This product cannot be used on major U.S. state highways currently due to the high psi ratings required by most states. Pervious concrete has been tested up to 4500 psi so far.

== Cellular concrete ==
Aerated concrete produced by the addition of an air-entraining agent to the concrete (or a lightweight aggregate such as expanded clay aggregate or cork granules and vermiculite) is sometimes called cellular concrete, lightweight aerated concrete, variable density concrete, Foam Concrete and lightweight or ultra-lightweight concrete, not to be confused with aerated autoclaved concrete, which is manufactured off-site using an entirely different method.

In the 1977 work A Pattern Language: Towns, Buildings and Construction, architect Christopher Alexander wrote in pattern 209 on "Good Materials":

Regular concrete is too dense. It is heavy and hard to work. After it sets one cannot cut into it, or nail into it. And it's [sic] surface is ugly, cold, and hard in feeling unless covered by expensive finishes not integral to the structure.
And yet concrete, in some form, is a fascinating material. It is fluid, strong, and relatively cheap. It is available in almost every part of the world. A University of California professor of engineering sciences, P. Kumar Mehta, has even just recently found a way of converting abandoned rice husks into Portland cement.[...] Is there any way of combining all these good qualities of concrete and also having a material which is light in weight, easy to work, with a pleasant finish? There is. It is possible to use a whole range of ultra-lightweight concretes which have a density and compressive strength very similar to that of wood. They are easy to work with, can be nailed with ordinary nails, cut with a saw, drilled with wood-working tools, easily repaired.[...]
We believe that ultra-lightweight concrete is one of the most fundamental bulk materials of the future.

The variable density is normally described in kg per m^{3}, where regular concrete is 2400 kg/m^{3}. Variable density can be as low as 300 kg/m^{3}, although at this density it would have no structural integrity at all and would function as a filler or insulation use only. The variable density reduces strength to increase thermal and acoustical insulation by replacing the dense heavy concrete with air or a light material such as clay, cork granules and vermiculite. There are many competing products that use a foaming agent that resembles shaving cream to mix air bubbles in with the concrete. All accomplish the same outcome: to displace concrete with air.

Properties of Foamed Concrete
Dry Density (kg/m3)	7-day Compressive Strength (N/mm2)	Thermal Conductivity* (W/mK)	Modulus of Elasticity (kN/mm2)	Drying contraction (%)
400	0.5–1.0	0.10	0.8–1.0	0.30–0.35
600	1.0–1.5	0.11	1.0–1.5	0.22–0.25
800	1.5–2.0	0.17–0.23	2.0–2.5	0.20–0.22
1000	2.5–3.0	0.23–0.30	2.5–3.0	0.18–0.15
1200	4.5–5.5	0.38–0.42	3.5–4.0	0.11–0.19
1400	6.0–8.0	0.50–0.55	5.0–6.0	0.09–0.07
1600	7.5–10.0	0.62–0.66	10.0–12.0	0.07–0.06

Applications of foamed concrete include:

- Roof insulation
- Blocks and panels for walls
- Levelling floors
- Void filling
- Road sub-bases and maintenance
- Bridge abutments and repairs
- Ground stabilisation

== Cork-cement composites ==
Waste Cork granules are obtained during production of bottle stoppers from the treated bark of Cork oak. These granules have a density of about 300 kg/m^{3}, lower than most lightweight aggregates used for making lightweight concrete. Cork granules do not significantly influence cement hydration, but cork dust may. Cork cement composites have several advantages over standard concrete, such as lower thermal conductivities, lower densities and good energy absorption characteristics. These composites can be made of density from 400 to 1500 kg/m^{3}, compressive strength from 1 to 26 MPa, and flexural strength from 0.5 to 4.0 MPa.

== Roller-compacted concrete ==
Roller-compacted concrete, sometimes called rollcrete, is a low-cement-content stiff concrete placed using techniques borrowed from earthmoving and paving work. The concrete is placed on the surface to be covered, and is compacted in place using large heavy rollers typically used in earthwork. The concrete mix achieves a high density and cures over time into a strong monolithic block. Roller-compacted concrete is typically used for concrete pavement, but has also been used to build concrete dams, as the low cement content causes less heat to be generated while curing than typical for conventionally placed massive concrete pours.

== Glass concrete ==
The use of recycled glass as aggregate in concrete has become popular in modern times, with large scale research being carried out at Columbia University in New York. This greatly enhances the aesthetic appeal of the concrete. Recent research findings have shown that concrete made with recycled glass aggregates have shown better long-term strength and better thermal insulation due to its better thermal properties of the glass aggregates.

== Asphalt concrete ==
Strictly speaking, asphalt is a form of concrete as well, with bituminous materials replacing cement as the binder.

== Rapid strength concrete ==
This type of concrete is able to develop high resistance within few hours after being manufactured. This feature has advantages such as removing the formwork early and to move forward in the building process very quickly, repaired road surfaces that become fully operational in just a few hours. Ultimate strength and durability can vary from that of standard concrete, depending on compositional details.

== Rubberized concrete ==
While "rubberized asphalt concrete" is common, rubberized Portland cement concrete ("rubberized PCC") is still undergoing experimental tests, as of 2009.

== Nanoconcrete ==
Nanoconcrete contains Portland cement particles that are no greater than 100 μm. It is a product of high-energy mixing (HEM) of cement, sand and water.

Recent studies have explored the use of computer vision techniques for detecting structural changes in lightweight concrete modified with nanoparticles. These approaches enable non-destructive assessment of microstructural heterogeneity and degradation processes in advanced cement-based materials.

== Polymer concrete ==
Polymer concrete is concrete which uses polymers to bind the aggregate. Polymer concrete can gain a lot of strength in a short amount of time. For example, a polymer mix may reach 5000 psi in only four hours. Polymer concrete is generally more expensive than conventional concretes.

== Geopolymer concrete ==
Geopolymer cement is an alternative to ordinary Portland cement and is used to produce Geopolymer concrete by adding regular aggregates to a geopolymer cement slurry. It is made from inorganic aluminosilicate (Al-Si) polymer compounds that can utilise recycled industrial waste (e.g. fly ash, blast furnace slag) as the manufacturing inputs resulting in up to 80% lower carbon dioxide emissions. Greater chemical and thermal resistance, and better mechanical properties, are said to be achieved for geopolymer concrete at both atmospheric and extreme conditions.

Similar concretes have not only been used in Ancient Rome (see Roman concrete), but also in the former Soviet Union in the 1950s and 1960s. Buildings in Ukraine are still standing after 45 years.

== Refractory cement ==
High-temperature applications, such as masonry ovens and the like, generally require the use of a refractory cement; concretes based on Portland cement can be damaged or destroyed by elevated temperatures, but refractory concretes are better able to withstand such conditions. Materials may include calcium aluminate cements, fire clay, ganister and minerals high in aluminium.

== Innovative mixtures ==
On-going research into alternative mixtures and constituents has identified potential mixtures that promise radically different properties and characteristics.

=== Bendable, self-healing concrete ===
Researchers at the University of Michigan have developed Engineered Cement Composites (ECC), a fiber-reinforced bendable concrete. The composite contains many of the ingredients used in regular concrete, but instead of coarse aggregate it includes microscale fibers. The mixture has much smaller crack propagation that does not suffer the usual cracking and subsequent loss of strength at high levels of tensile stress. Researchers have been able to take mixtures beyond 3 percent strain, past the more typical 0.1% point at which failure occurs. In addition, the composition of the material supports self-healing. When cracks occur, extra dry cement in the concrete is exposed. It reacts with water and carbon dioxide to form calcium carbonate and fix the crack.

=== CO_{2} sequestering concretes ===
Researchers have tried to sequester CO_{2} in concrete by developing advanced materials. One approach is to use magnesium silicate (talc) as an alternative to calcium. This lowers the temperature required for the production process and decreases the release of carbon dioxide during firing. During the hardening phase, additional carbon is sequestered.

A related approach is mineral carbonation (MC). It produces stable carbonate aggregates from calcium- or magnesium-containing materials and CO_{2}. Stable aggregates can be used for concrete or to produce carbon neutral building blocks such as bricks or precast concrete. CarbonCure Technologies uses waste CO_{2} from oil refineries to make its bricks and wet cement mix, offsetting up to 5% of its carbon footprint. Solidia Technologies fires its brick and precast concrete at lower temperatures and cures them with CO_{2} gas, claiming to reduce its carbon emissions by 30%.

Another method of calcium-based mineral carbonation has been inspired by biomimicry of naturally occurring calcium structures. Ginger Krieg Dosier of bioMASON has developed a method for producing bricks without firing kilns or significant carbon release. The bricks are grown in molds over four days through a process of microbiologically induced calcite precipitation. Sporosarcina pasteurii bacteria forms calcite from water, calcium, and urea, incorporating CO_{2} from the urea, and releasing ammonia for fertilizer.

One research team found a way to use a form of microalgae called coccolithophores to mass produce calcium carbonate via photosynthesis at a faster rate than corals. They can survive in warm, cold, salt and fresh water. The technique has the potential to absorb more CO_{2} than it emits. Between 1-2 million acres of open ponds could supply enough microalgae to satisfy US cement consumption. The team claims the material can be immediately substituted into existing production processes.

=== Living walls resisting desiccation ===
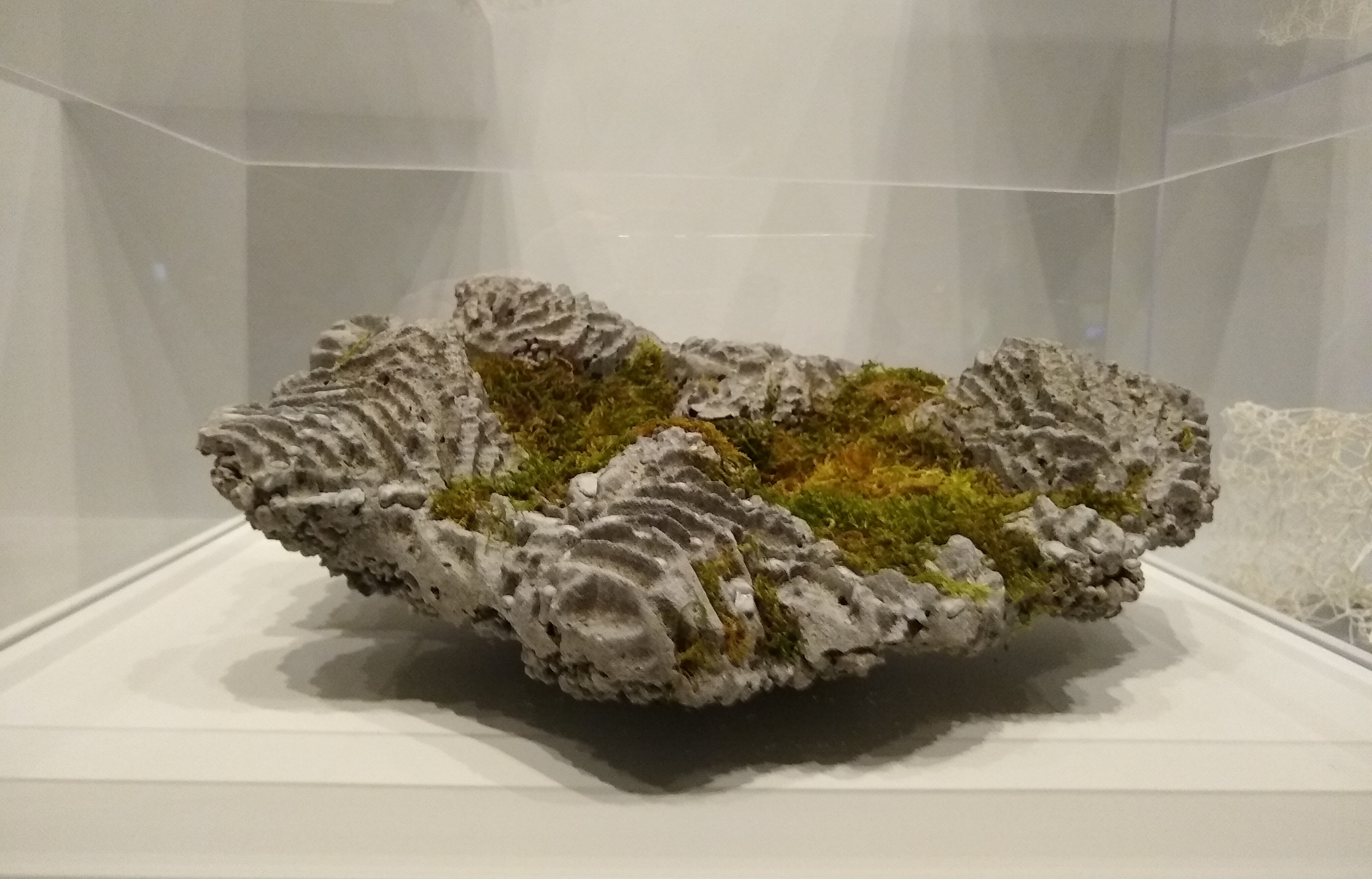
Bioreceptive lightweight concrete for use in living walls

Another approach involves the development of bioreceptive lightweight concrete which can be used to create living walls resisting desiccation. Researchers at the Bartlett School of Architecture are developing materials aimed to support the growth of poikilohydric plants such as algae, mosses and lichens (organisms having no mechanism to prevent desiccation). Once established, the combination of new materials and plants can potentially improve storm-water management and absorb pollutants.

=== Smog eating ===
Titanium dioxide has been added to concrete mixtures to reduce smog. A daylight photo-catalytic between the titanium in this concrete and the smog reduces bacteria and dirt from accumulating on the surface. It can also be used to break down nitrogen dioxides created by industrial processes.

== Gypsum concrete ==
Gypsum concrete is a building material used as a floor underlay used in wood-frame and concrete construction for fire ratings, sound reduction, radiant heating, and floor leveling. It is a mixture of gypsum, Portland cement, and sand. One of its advantages is the lightweight nature. It weighs less than regular concrete while maintaining comparable compressive strength and costs. It is also easy to work with and level, allowing for faster installation and higher productivity. The use of gypsum concrete for radiant heat flooring became popular in the 1980s with the introduction of plastic PEX tubing, which is not susceptible to corrosion from the concrete.

== Foam concrete ==
Foam concrete, also known as lightweight cellular concrete or foamed cement, is a cement-based material that incorporates stable air bubbles to create a lightweight and highly insulating product. Unlike air-entrained concrete, which introduces tiny air bubbles through an admixture during mixing, foam concrete replaces coarse aggregates with these air bubbles, resulting in a significant difference in density, with foam concrete typically ranging from 400kg/m3 to 1600kg/m3, whereas air-entrained concrete maintains its density. Foam concrete is produced by mixing cement or fly ash, sand, water, and a synthetic aerated foam, which provides stability to the air bubbles, in contrast to air-entrained concrete which is produced incorporating specialized admixtures directly into the concrete mix. Foam concrete offers excellent thermal and acoustic insulation properties, making it suitable for applications such as insulation, void filling, and trench reinstatement. Its lightweight nature also makes it easier to handle and transport compared to traditional concrete. Foam concrete can be easily molded into various shapes and sizes, allowing for versatile applications. Its properties make it suitable for insulation, void filling, and other construction applications where weight reduction and thermal insulation are desired.

== Air-entrained concrete ==
Air-entrained concrete is a type of concrete that intentionally incorporates tiny air bubbles (10 to 500 micrometres in diameter) through the addition of an air entraining agent during the mixing process. These air bubbles enhance the workability of the concrete during placement and improve its durability when hardened, particularly in regions prone to freeze-thaw cycles. Unlike foam concrete, which is lightweight and created by introducing stable air bubbles using a foam agent, air-entrained concrete maintains its density (air consists of 6–12 vol.%) while enhancing durability, workability, and resistance to freeze-thaw cycles. The main benefits of air-entrained concrete include improved workability during placement, increased resistance to cracking and surface damage, enhanced durability against fire damage, and overall strength. Additionally, the air voids in air-entrained concrete act as internal cushioning, absorbing energy during impact and increasing resistance to physical forces, thereby increasing its overall durability.

== Marine habitat concrete ==
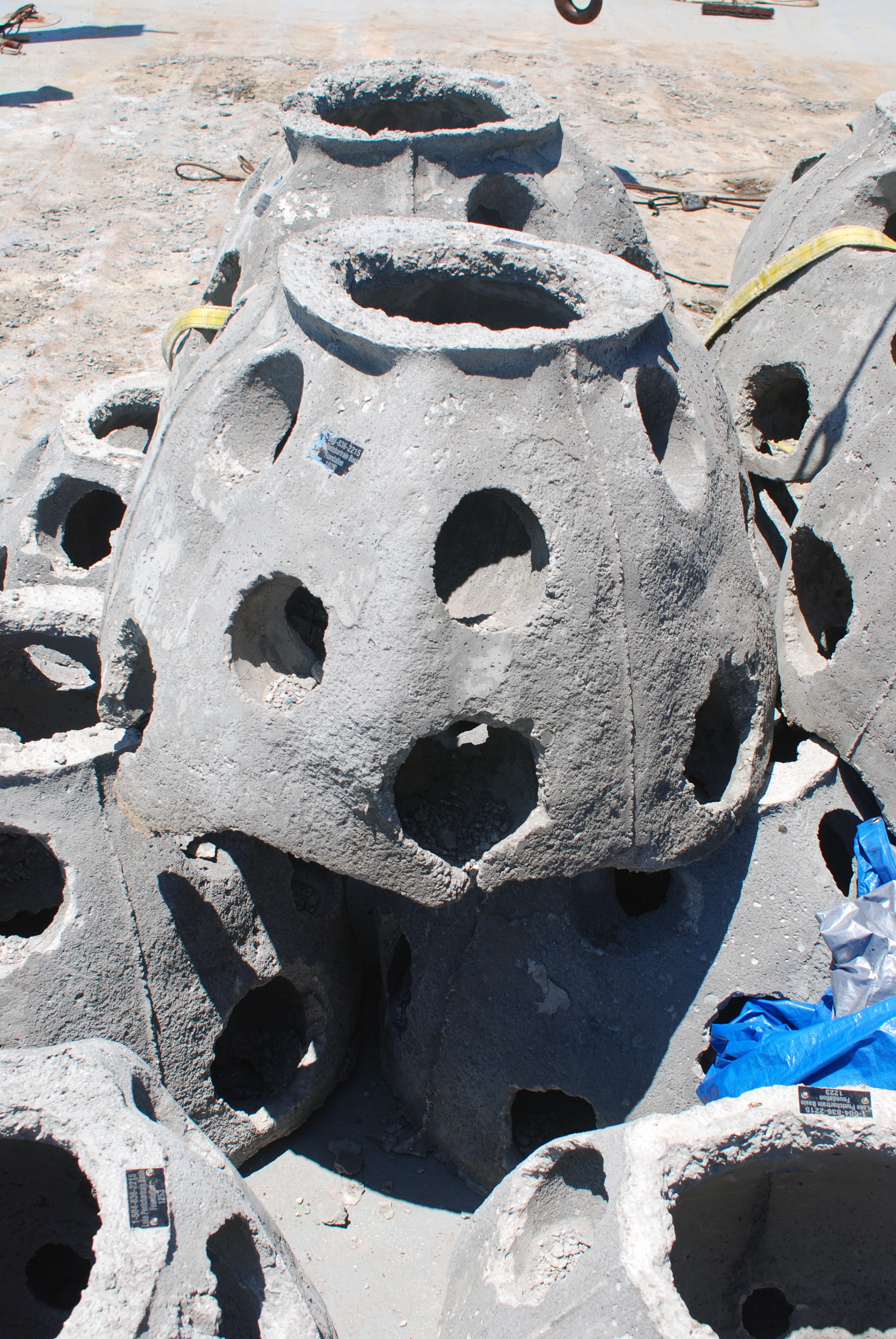
Reef balls are just one type of structure used in the construction of artificial reefs.

Marine habitat concrete is concrete used in artificial reefs. The concrete creates shelter & a home for marine life. This is also called bio-enhancing concrete or ecological concrete.

== See also ==
- Engineered cementitious composite – Bendable concrete
- Eurocodes – European Union structural design standards
  - Eurocode 2: Design of concrete structures
- Ferrocement – System of reinforced mortar or plaster
- Ready-mix concrete – Concrete that is manufactured in a batch plant, according to a set engineered mix design
- Reinforced concrete – Concrete with rebar
