= High-performance fiber-reinforced cementitious composites =

High-performance fiber-reinforced cementitious composites (HPFRCCs) are a group of fiber-reinforced cement-based composites that possess the unique ability to flex and self-strengthen before fracturing. This particular class of concrete was developed with the goal of solving the structural problems inherent with today’s typical concrete, such as its tendency to fail in a brittle manner under excessive loading and its lack of long-term durability. Because of their design and composition, HPFRCCs possess the remarkable ability to plastically yield and harden under excessive loading, so that they flex or deform before fracturing, a behavior similar to that exhibited by most metals under tensile or bending stresses. Because of this capability, HPFRCCs are more resistant to cracking and last considerably longer than normal concrete. Another extremely desirable property of HPFRCCs is their low density. A less dense, and hence lighter material means that HPFRCCs could eventually require much less energy to produce and handle, deeming them a more economical building material. Because of HPFRCCs’ lightweight composition and ability to strain harden, it has been proposed that they could eventually become a more durable and efficient alternative to typical concrete.

HPFRCCs are simply a subcategory of ductile fiber-reinforced cementititous composites (DFRCCs) that possess the ability to strain harden under both bending and tensile loads, not to be confused with other DFRCCs that only strain harden under bending loads.

== Composition ==
Because several specific formulas are included in the HPFRCC class, their physical compositions vary considerably. However, most HPFRCCs include at least the following ingredients: fine aggregates, a superplasticizer, polymeric or metallic fibers, cement, and water. Thus the principal difference between HPFRCC and typical concrete composition lies in HPFRCCs' lack of coarse aggregates. Typically, a fine aggregate such as silica sand is used in HPFRCCs.

== Material properties ==
Strain hardening, the most coveted capability of HPFRCCs, occurs when a material is loaded past its elastic limit and begins to deform plastically. This stretching or ‘straining’ action actually strengthens the material. This phenomenon is made possible through the development of multiple microscopic cracks, opposed to the single crack/strain softening behavior exhibited by typical fiber-reinforced concretes. It occurs in HPFRCCs as several fibers slip past one another.

One aspect of HPFRCC design involves preventing crack propagation, or the tendency of a crack to increase in length, ultimately leading to material fracture. This occurrence is hindered by the presence of fiber bridging, a property that most HPFRCCs are specifically designed to possess. Fiber bridging is the act of several fibers exerting a force across the width of a crack in an attempt to prevent the crack from developing further. This capability is what gives bendable concrete its ductile properties.

Listed below are some basic mechanical properties of ECC, or Engineered Cementitious Composite, a specific formula of HPFRCC, developed at the University of Michigan. This information is available in Victor C. Li's article on (ECC)- Tailored Composites through Micromechanical Modeling. The first property listed, the ultimate tensile strength of 4.6 MPa, is slightly larger than the accepted tensile strength of standard fiber-reinforced concretes, (4.3 MPa). More notable, however, is the extremely high ultimate strain value of 5.6% when compared to most FRC's ultimate strain values ranging in the few hundredths of a percent. The first crack stress and first crack strain values are significantly low compared to normal concrete, both the result of the multiple crack phenomenon associated with HPFRCCs.

ECC Material Properties
Ultimate Tensile Strength ( σCU )	4.6 MPa
Ultimate Strain ( εCU )	5.6 %
First Crack Stress ( σfc )	2.5 MPa
First Crack Strain ( εfc )	.021 %
Modulus of Elasticity ( E )	22 GPa

== Design methodology ==
The basis for the engineered design of different HPFRCCs varies considerably despite their similar compositions. For instance, the design of one type of HPFRCC called ECC stems from the principles of micromechanics. This field of study is best described as relating macroscopic mechanical properties to a composite's microstructure, and is only one specific method used to design HPFRCCs. Another design methodology used in other formulas of HPFRCCs is based on the material’s ability to withstand seismic loading.

== Applications ==
Proposed uses for HPFRCCs include bridge decks, concrete pipes, roads, structures subjected to seismic and non-seismic loads, and other applications where a lightweight, strong and durable building material is desired.

ECC has already been used by the Michigan Department of Transportation to patch a portion of the Grove Street Bridge deck over Interstate 94. The ECC patch was used as a replacement to the previously existent expansion joint that linked two deck slabs. Expansion joints, commonly used in bridges to allow for the seasonal expansion and contraction of the concrete decks, are an example of a ubiquitous construction practice that could eventually be eliminated through the use of bendable concrete.

Other existent structures composed of HPFRCCs, specifically ECC, include the Curtis Road Bridge in Ann Arbor, MI and the Mihara Bridge in Hokkaido, Japan. The deck of the Mihara Bridge, composed of bendable concrete, is only five centimeters thick and has an expected lifetime of one-hundred years.

Though HPFRCCs have been tested extensively in the lab and been employed in a few commercial building projects, further long-term research and real-world application is needed to prove the true benefits of this material.
