= Engineered cementitious composite =

Bendable concrete

Engineered cementitious composite (ECC), also called strain hardening cement-based composites (SHCC) or more popularly as bendable concrete, is an easily molded mortar-based composite reinforced with specially selected short random fibers, usually polymer fibers. Unlike regular concrete, ECC has a tensile strain capacity in the range of 3–7%, compared to 0.01% for ordinary portland cement (OPC) paste, mortar or concrete. ECC therefore acts more like a ductile metal material rather than a brittle glass material (as does OPC concrete), leading to a wide variety of applications.

== Development ==
ECC, unlike common fiber reinforced concrete, is a family of micromechanically designed materials. As long as a cementitious material is designed/developed based on micromechanics and fracture mechanics theory to feature large tensile ductility, it can be called an ECC. Therefore, ECC is not a fixed material design, but a broad range of topics under different stages of research, development, and implementations. The ECC material family is expanding. The development of an individual mix design of ECC requires special efforts by systematically engineering of the material at nano-, micro-, macro- and composite scales.

ECC looks similar to ordinary Portland cement-based concrete, except that it can deform (or bend) under strain. A number of research groups are developing ECC science, including those at the University of Michigan, University of California, Irvine, Delft University of Technology, the University of Tokyo, the Czech Technical University, University of British Columbia, and Stanford University. Traditional concrete's lack of durability and failure under strain, both stemming from brittle behavior, have been a pushing factor in the development of ECC.

== Properties ==
ECC has a variety of unique properties, including tensile properties superior to other fiber-reinforced composites, ease of processing on par with conventional cement, the use of only a small volume fraction of fibers (~2%), tight crack width, and a lack of anisotropically weak planes. These properties are due largely to the interaction between the fibers and cementing matrix, which can be custom-tailored through micromechanics design. Essentially, the fibers create many microcracks with a very specific width, rather than a few very large cracks (as in conventional concrete). This allows ECC to deform without catastrophic failure.

This microcracking behavior leads to superior corrosion resistance (the cracks are so small and numerous that it is difficult for aggressive media to penetrate and attack the reinforcing steel) as well as to self-healing. In the presence of water (during a rainstorm, for instance) unreacted cement particles recently exposed due to cracking hydrate and form a number of products (calcium silicate hydrates (C-S-H), calcite, etc.) that expand and fill in the crack. These products appear as a white 'scar' material filling in the crack. This self-healing behavior not only seals the crack to prevent transport of fluids, but mechanical properties are regained. This self-healing has been observed in a variety of conventional cement and concretes; however, above a certain crack width self healing becomes less effective. It is the tightly controlled crack widths seen in ECC that ensure all cracks thoroughly heal when exposed to the natural environment.

When combined with a more conductive material, all cement materials can increase in conductivity and be used for damage-sensing. This is essentially based on the fact that conductivity will change as damage occurs; the addition of conductive material is meant to raise the conductivity to a level where such changes will be easily identified. Though not a material property of ECC itself, semi-conductive ECC for damage-sensing are being developed.

== Types ==
There are a number of different varieties of ECC, including:

- Lightweight (i.e. low density) ECC have been developed through the addition of air voids, glass bubbles, polymer spheres, and/or lightweight aggregate. Compared to other lightweight concretes, lightweight ECC has superior ductility. Applications include floating homes, barges, and canoes.
- 'Self compacting concrete' refers to a concrete that can flow under its own weight. For instance, a self-compacting material would be able to fill a mold containing elaborate pre-positioned steel reinforcement without the need of vibration or shaking to ensure even distribution. Self-compacting ECC was developed through the use of chemical admixtures to decrease viscosity and through controlling particle interactions with mix proportioning.
- Sprayable ECC, which can be pneumatically sprayed from a hose, have been developed by using various superplasticizing agents and viscosity-reducing admixtures. Compared to other sprayable fiber-reinforced composites, sprayable ECC has enhanced pumpability in addition to its unique mechanical properties. Sprayable ECC has been used for retrofitting/repair work and tunnel/sewer linings.
- An extrudable ECC for use in the extrusion of pipes was first developed in 1998. Extruded ECC pipes have both higher load capacity and higher deformability than any other extruded fiber-reinforced composite pipes.

== Field applications ==
ECC have found use in a number of large-scale applications in Japan, Korea, Switzerland, Australia and the U.S. These include:

- The Mitaka Dam near Hiroshima was repaired using ECC in 2003. The surface of the then 60-year-old dam was severely damaged, showing evidence of cracks, spalling, and some water leakage. A 20 mm-thick layer of ECC was applied by spraying over the 600 m^{2} surface.
- Also in 2003, an earth retaining wall in Gifu, Japan, was repaired using ECC. Ordinary portland cement could not be used due to the severity of the cracking in the original structure, which would have caused reflective cracking. ECC was intended to minimize this danger; after one year only microcracks of tolerable width were observed.
- The 95 m (312 ft.) Glorio Roppongi high-rise apartment building in Tokyo contains a total of 54 ECC coupling beams (two per story) intended to mitigate earthquake damage. The properties of ECC (high damage tolerance, high energy absorption, and ability to deform under shear) give it superior properties in seismic resistance applications when compared to ordinary portland cement. Similar structures include the 41-story Nabeaure Yokohama Tower (four coupling beams per floor.)
- The 1 km (0.62 mi) long Mihara Bridge in Hokkaido, Japan was opened to traffic in 2005. The steel-reinforced road bed contains nearly 800 m3 of ECC material. The tensile ductility and tight crack control behavior of ECC led to a 40% reduction in material used during construction.
- Similarly, a 225-mm thick ECC bridge deck on interstate 94 in Michigan was completed in 2005. 30 m^{3} of material was used, delivered on-site in standard mixing trucks. Due to the unique mechanical properties of ECC, this deck also used less material than a proposed deck made of ordinary portland cement. Both the University of Michigan and the Michigan Department of Transportation are monitoring the bridge in an attempt to verify the theoretical superior durability of ECC; after four years of monitoring, performance remained undiminished.
- The first self-consolidating and high-early-strength ECC patch repair was placed on Ellsworth Road Bridge over US-23 in November 2006. The high-early-strength ECC can achieve a compressive strength of 23.59 ± 1.40 MPa (3422.16 ± 203.33 psi) in four hours and 55.59 ± 2.17 MPa (8062.90 ± 315.03 psi) in 28 days, allowing for fast repair and re-opening the session to traffic. The high-early-strength ECC repair has shown superior long-term durability in field conditions compared to typical concrete repair materials.

== Comparison to other composite materials ==
Properties	FRC	Common HPFRCC	ECC
Design Methodology	N.A.	Use high Vf	Micromechanics based, minimize Vf for cost and processibility
Fiber	Any type, Vf usually less than 2%; df for steel ~ 500 micrometre	Mostly steel, Vf usually > 5%; df ~ 150 micrometre	Tailored, polymer fibers, Vf usually less than 2%; df < 50 micrometre
Matrix	Coarse aggregates	Fine aggregates	Controlled for matrix toughness, flaw size; fine sand
Interface	Not controlled	Not controlled	Chemical and frictional bonds controlled for bridging properties
Mechanical Properties	Strain-softening:	Strain-hardening:	Strain-hardening:
Tensile strain	0.1%	<1.5%	>3% (typical); 8% max
Crack width	Unlimited	Typically several hundred micrometres, unlimited beyond 1.5% strain	Typically < 100 micrometres during strain-hardening

Note: FRC = Fiber-reinforced cement. HPFRCC = High-performance fiber reinforced cementitious composites

== See also ==
- High performance fiber reinforced cementitious composites
