= Fan mussel =

Fan mussel is a common name for several bivalves and may refer to:

- Atrina fragilis, native to the northeast Atlantic Ocean and the Mediterranean Sea
- Pinna nobilis, native to the Mediterranean Sea
