= Bullnose =

Rounded convex trim in masonry and ceramic tile

Bullnosed ceramic tile trim

A bullnose is a broad convex radius on construction materials such as wood, masonry, and ceramic tile. The term is also used for materials featuring such a profile, as in a “bullnose tile”. It is also used in relation to road safety and (formerly) railroad engineering design.

== Uses ==
A bullnose profile is used both for safety and decorative effect, as an alternative to a flat-edged chamfer. It is variously added to construction materials with tools such as a mill, plane, and bit in a shaper or router.

Trim with a bullnose profile is used to provide a smooth, rounded edge for countertops, staircase steps, building corners, or other construction. Masonry units such as bricks, concrete masonry units, or structural glazed facing tiles may be ordered from manufacturers with bullnosed edges and corners.

The standard bullnose terminology refers to a one-quarter profile; two adjacent quarter profiles constitute a half bullnose. Rather than being machined from a single piece of material, a half bullnose may be created by bonding two one-quarter bullnoses together.

In the image above, quarter-bullnose tile is used adjacent to a square-edged piece of field tile to create a finished edge — note that the top trim strip bears a quarter-bullnose on both its edge and end.

=== Non-architectural contexts ===
A bullnose is used in highway construction in North America and other countries to buffer and protect the exposed end of the crash barrier or Jersey barrier at entrance and exit ramps, similar to the rounding of a guard stone.

In the 19th century, the roofs of railroad passenger cars often had a raised centre section to improve ventilation and internal lighting. They were called lantern or clerestory roofs. The design soon evolved to incorporate a bullnose at each end.

== Name ==
The term bullnose originates from the rounded nose of a bull.
