= Structural clay tile =

Class of building block

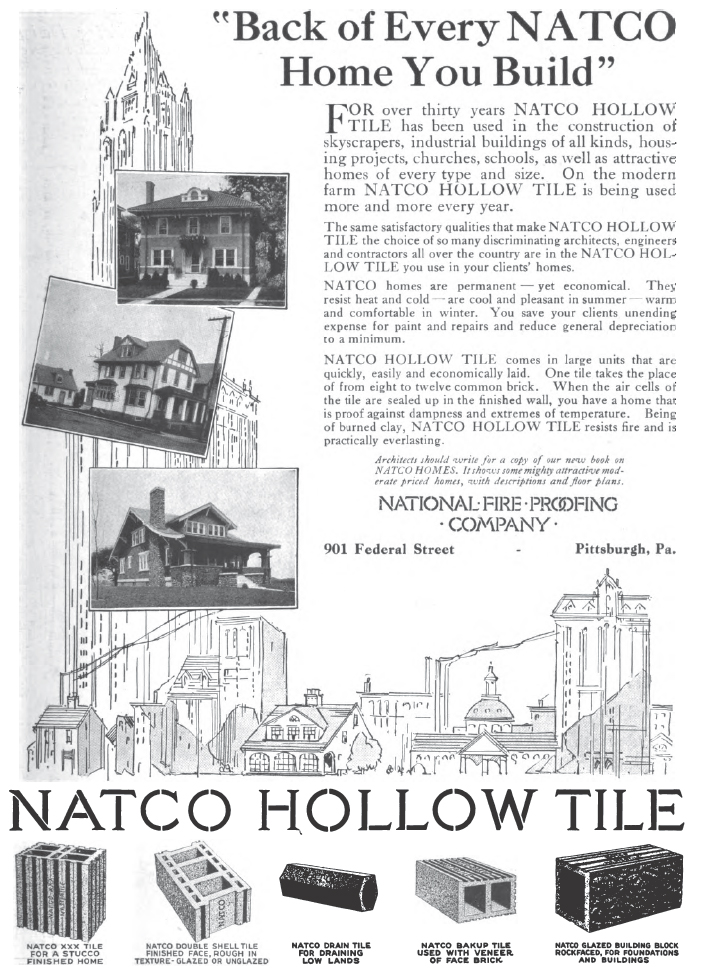
Advertisement of hollow structural tile circa 1920.

Structural clay tile describes a category of burned-clay building materials used to construct roofing, walls, and flooring for structural and non-structural purposes, especially in fireproofing applications. Also called building tile, structural terra cotta, hollow tile, saltillo tile, and clay block, the material is an extruded clay shape with substantial depth that allows it to be laid in the same manner as other clay or concrete masonry.

In North America, it was mainly used during the late 19th and early 20th centuries, reaching peak popularity at the turn of the century and declining around the 1950s. Structural clay tile grew in popularity in the end of the nineteenth-century because it could be constructed faster, was lighter, and required simpler flat falsework than earlier brick vaulting construction.

Each unit is generally made of clay or terra-cotta with hollow cavities, or cells, inside it. The colors of terracotta transform from gray (raw, moist clay) to orange, red, yellow, and cream tones. This is due to an effect of the firing process which hardens the clay so it can be used for structural purposes. The material is commonly used in floor arches, fireproofing, partition walls, and furring. It continues to be used in Europe to build fire-resistant walls and partitions. In North America the material has largely been replaced by concrete blocks.

== History, Origins, and Development ==
=== Pre 1850s-1870s ===
Clay tiles have been used in various ways for thousands of years. The Romans were among the first to use clay tile in construction by building clay pots to lighten vaulting loads. However the first recorded structural use of terra-cotta forms was in sixth-century Italy in the dome of the Church of San Vitale in Ravenna. Clay pots lined with plaster of paris lightened the load of the dome in a similar way to earlier Roman construction.

=== 1850s-1870s ===
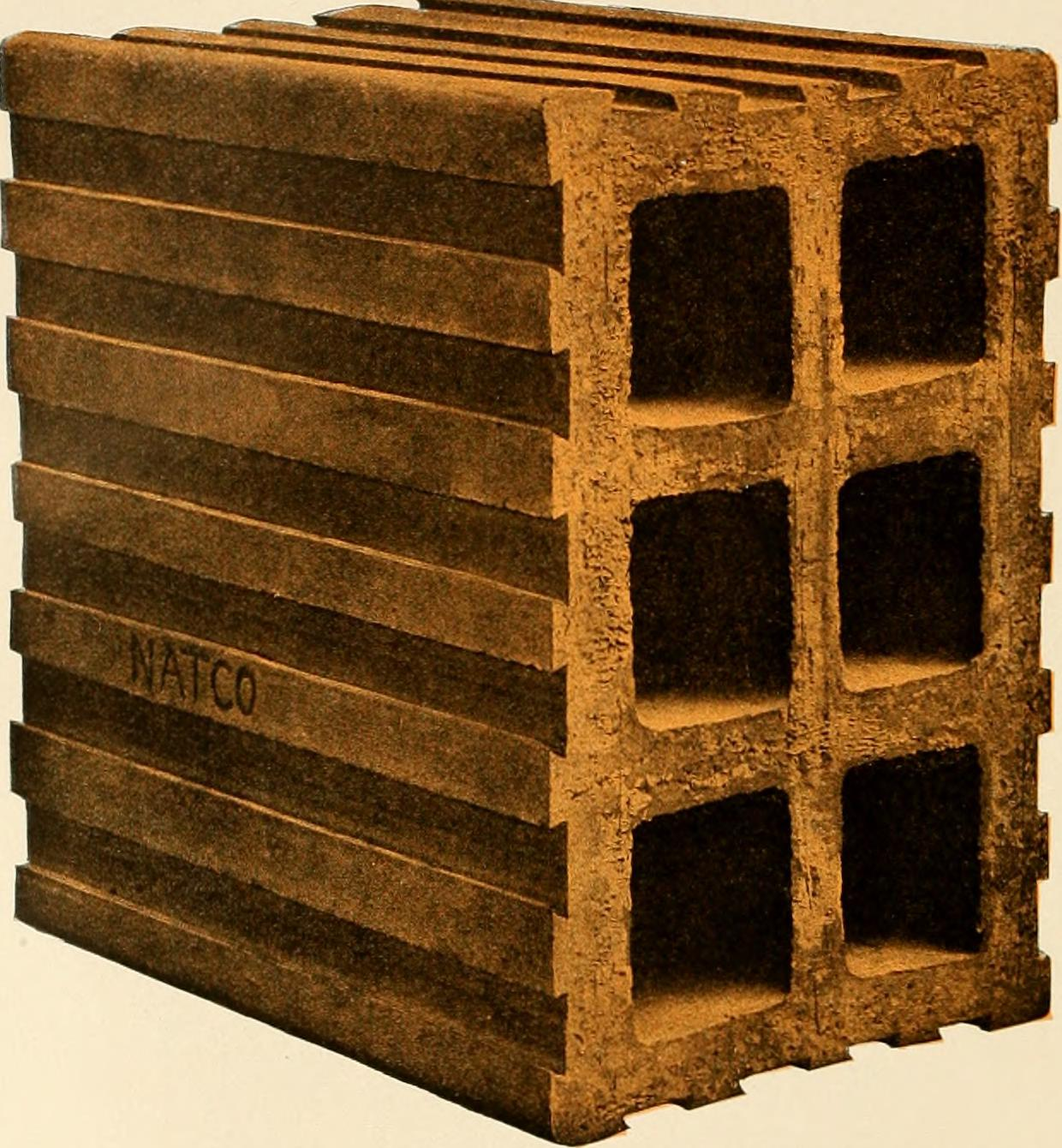
An example of a typical NATCO hollow clay tile as advertised in their 1910 catalogue. "The visible points of superiority, as compared with similar tile of different makes, are the deep dovetail scoring for the better bonding of stucco or plaster, the absence of imperfections and the better general symmetry due to the more accurate machining by this company's unequaled equipment. Equally important qualities not obtainable in other tile are not so apparent to the eye. These consist of finer properties in the raw clay and its more uniform and thorough burning, resulting in greater density and a higher degree of inherent strength. It is to certify these advantages, and to instantly identify the tile possessing them, that the name NATCO is stamped plainly upon the face of each tile." —From NATCO Catalog "Fireproof Construction for Houses and Other Buildings at Moderate Cost," 1910.

The first recorded use of structural clay tile in the United States was in 1853. Frederick A. Peterson designed hand-shaped clay ovals that he placed between I-beams and covered with cement to create flooring. Peterson debuted his method in the Cooper Union Building in New York City.

However, Peterson's method was not mass-produced or replicated until the 1870s. In 1871, Balthasar Kreischer and George H. Johnson patented a new method similar to Peterson's, based on earlier precedents including those of British architect Joseph Bunnett in 1858, as well as designs by Peterson. Each of these methods emerged out of a growing need to fireproof buildings following massive fires across the United States during that last quarter of the nineteenth century.

Before the widespread use structural clay tile, brick and masonry construction dominated fireproofing techniques. However, brick and masonry construction, especially vaulting, was heavy, time-consuming to construct, and required the construction of costly custom formwork. Structural clay tile offered a lighter, faster, and simpler alternative.

In the early 1870s, an interlocking system of angular clay tiles, designed to fit together with a keystone, gained popularity following the mass production of Vincent Garcin's designs for flat segmented arches. This flat segmented arch, developed by Garcin, was first used in the United States at the New York Post Office, Kendall Building in Chicago, and the Singer Manufacturing Building in St. Louis, becoming the most prolific use of hollow clay tile until the end of the century.

=== 1880s-1900s ===
With its increased popularity, structural clay tile became one of the most popular materials for fireproofing iron and steel construction. However, its capacity for fireproofing was not fully realized until Peter Bonnett Wight invented the "tile shoe" in 1881. The "tile shoe" covered the exposed side of metal beams, fully insulating them from fire.

=== 1910s-1950s ===
Flat arch construction grew in popularity with the increasing number of buildings using steel and iron structural members in their design. New building code requirements for fireproofing aided in the use and proliferation of structural clay tile in skyscrapers and other large buildings.

After 1910, manufacturers began to test and develop stronger and more complex structural clay tile systems that worked better in compression. Greater compressive strength, found largely in the invention of the end pressure arch, allowed the material to be used in longer floor spans. However, as reinforced concrete grew in popularity as a cheaper and less complex alternative, structural clay tile use in floors and roofing declined. Increasingly, clay tile was used inside concrete flooring to make it lighter, or as centering/formwork for concrete construction.

With the rise of reinforced concrete flooring and metal decking, structural clay tile fell out of popularity for use in horizontal applications. While the use of structural clay tile in flooring and roofing declined, its use in walls enjoyed popularity into the 1950s. Wall tile blocks continue to be manufactured, but specialty tile units often require custom commissions. Clay tile arches are no longer manufactured and due to a lack of skilled artisans to lay the arch systems, they are never replaced.

== Horizontal Application ==
=== Tile Floor Arch Types ===
==== Side Pressure Arch Construction ====
Side pressure arch construction, the first method used in tile floor arches, is composed of hollow tiles laid parallel to I beams.

==== End Pressure Arch Construction ====
End pressure arch construction is composed of hollow tiles laid perpendicular to I beams. This method enjoyed popularity after it was discovered to be fifty percent more efficient than side pressure arches.

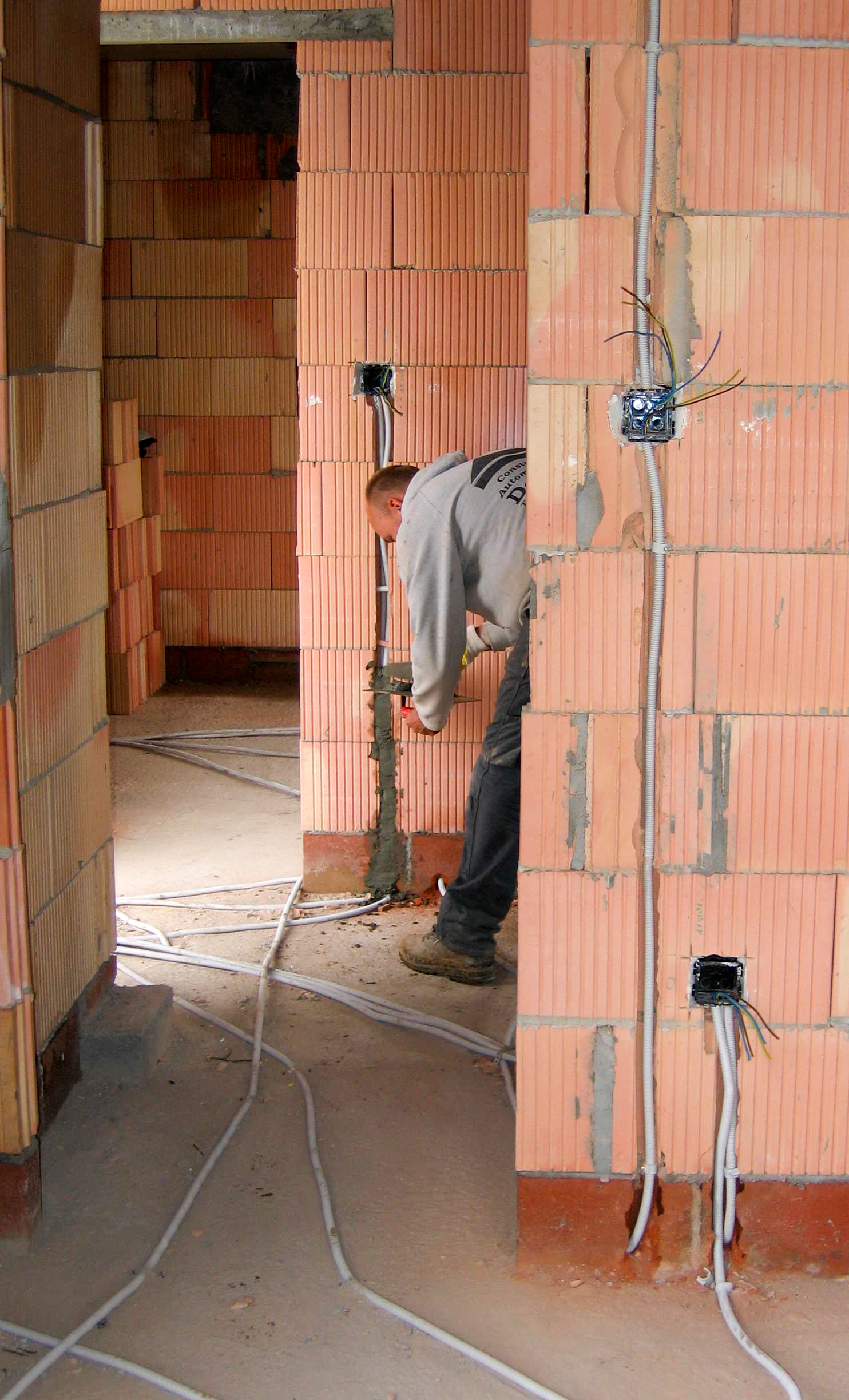
Electrical wiring being installed in structural clay tile block used for interior partitions in the vertical application, 2008.

=== Book Tile ===
A popular use of structural clay tile was book tile, a flat hollow tile, that was used in roofing systems. Book tile was also used in raised flooring to allow plumbing and other systems to be run in buildings.

== Composite Construction ==
In the late 1890s, the most popular system of tile floor arches combined both side and end pressure construction. With the increase in popularity of concrete construction, composite construction began to use both methods in conjunction with reinforced concrete. Later systems used clay tiles and reinforced concrete to replace tile floor arches in the 1930s.

== Vertical Application ==
The most popular and enduring form of structural clay tile is its use in vertical applications as a structural element. In the vertical application, structural clay tile blocks are used in both columns and load bearing walls. Likewise, structural clay tile blocks were frequently used as backing for exterior walls, often filling the voids behind architectural ornament, stone, or brickwork.

In early steel construction, clay tile blocks were historically used as infill between structural members, which provided much needed lateral support. In some cases, entire walls—typically in single-story buildings, seldom higher—were created out of structural clay tile, typically multiple wythes thick. The cells of these blocks could be either unfilled or filled with reinforcing and grout.

=== Specialty Types ===
==== Structural Glazed Facing Tiles ====
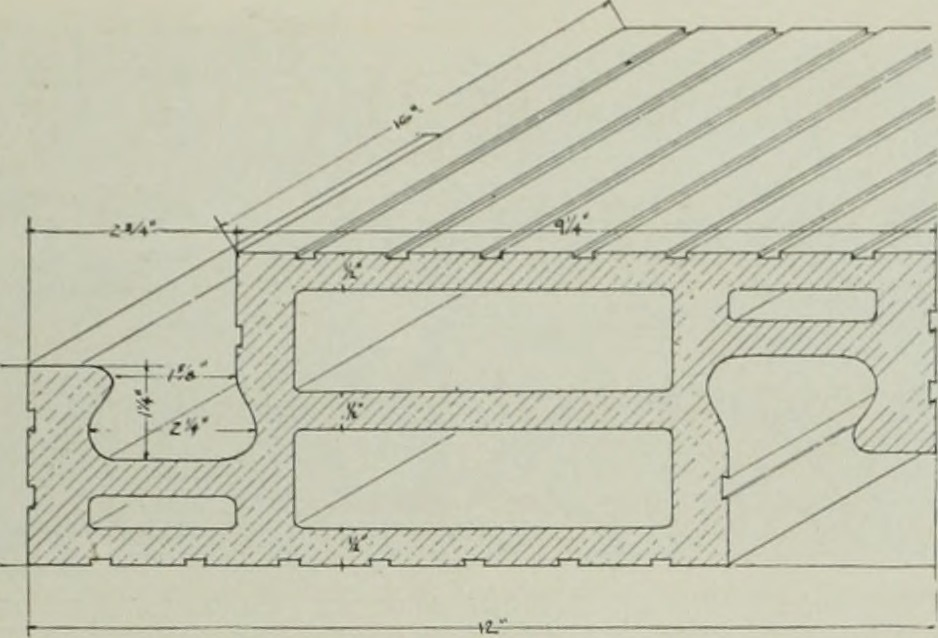
An example of a specialty type of hollow clay tile unit. This example interlocked with other units to increase strength, circa 1905.

Structural glazed facing tile is perhaps its most common and prolific form of clay tile block. Structural glazed facing tile has been extensively used in institutional settings where a durable, easily cleanable surface is desired. The material is commonly found in schools, correctional facilities, swimming pools and similar facilities. A wide variety of shapes have been developed to allow the construction of corners, caps, wall base and other elements using standard sizes. SGFT cannot be easily cut without damage to the glazed surface, so several dozen special shapes are available to allow most situations to be accommodated. SGFT features a fired glazed surface that may be produced in colors similar to those available from standard ceramic tile. SGFT has been replaced in some applications by glazed masonry units, a composite of concrete masonry and a tile-like surface coating.

Specialized kinds of structural clay tile were produced with a vitrified or glazed curved surface for use in building farm silos. Other shapes, called "telephone tiles", were used as underground multi-celled conduits for telephone cables.

== Manufacturing and Classification ==
=== Manufacturing ===
Structural clay tile is still manufactured according to historical processes: clay is kneaded to an appropriate consistency, extruded, sliced and fired in large kilns. Different dies are used for each type and shape of structural clay tile.

=== Classification ===
Structural clay tile is classified into three grades: hard, semi-porous, and porous. Each classification is differentiated by the length of time the tile is fired during the manufacturing process, and each classification is used for different purposes.

Hard tile has the greatest structural strength of the three categories, and is used largely in applications where it is exposed to the elements. Its hardness resists moisture, as it is less porous than other classifications. However, hard tile is less fireproof as it is prone to cracking in high heat.

Semi-porous tile has moderate strength and is resistant to moisture.

Porous tile is made by mixing clay with straw, sawdust or other materials that are burned out during the manufacturing process making it highly porous and lighter, in addition to reducing structural dead loads. Porous tile was preferred among builders for fireproofing since it behaved well in high heat.

Tile is classified into load-bearing and non-load-bearing categories. Load-bearing tile is described under ASTM Standard C34, subdivided into grade LBX, for areas exposed to weathering, and LB, for protected applications. Non-load-bearing tile is described under ASTM C56 in one grade, NB. It is used for interior partitions, and may be laid with cells running horizontally or vertically. Tile may be ribbed to accept a plaster finish, or smooth. Special shapes were available to attach to and to fit around structural steel shapes, providing a fire-resistant enclosure for the load-bearing steel members.

Structural clay tiles are manufactured in a variety of standard sizes, including 4 inches (10 cm), 6 inches (15 cm), 8 inches (20 cm), 10 inches (25 cm) and 12 inches (30 cm)thicknesses, and typically 12 inches (30 cm) x 12 inches (30 cm) or 12 inches (30 cm) x 8 inches (20 cm) face dimensions. Tile was also manufactured in a series of graduated wedge shapes for installation between steel members as a fireproof flat arch floor structure, to be covered with a concrete wearing surface above. In other cases, structural clay tile was used as a permanent form material to reduce the bulk and weight of structural concrete floor slabs.

== See also ==
- Terracotta
- Gypsum block
- Architectural terracotta
- Reinforced concrete
