= Porte-cochère =

Roofed shelter outside a doorway

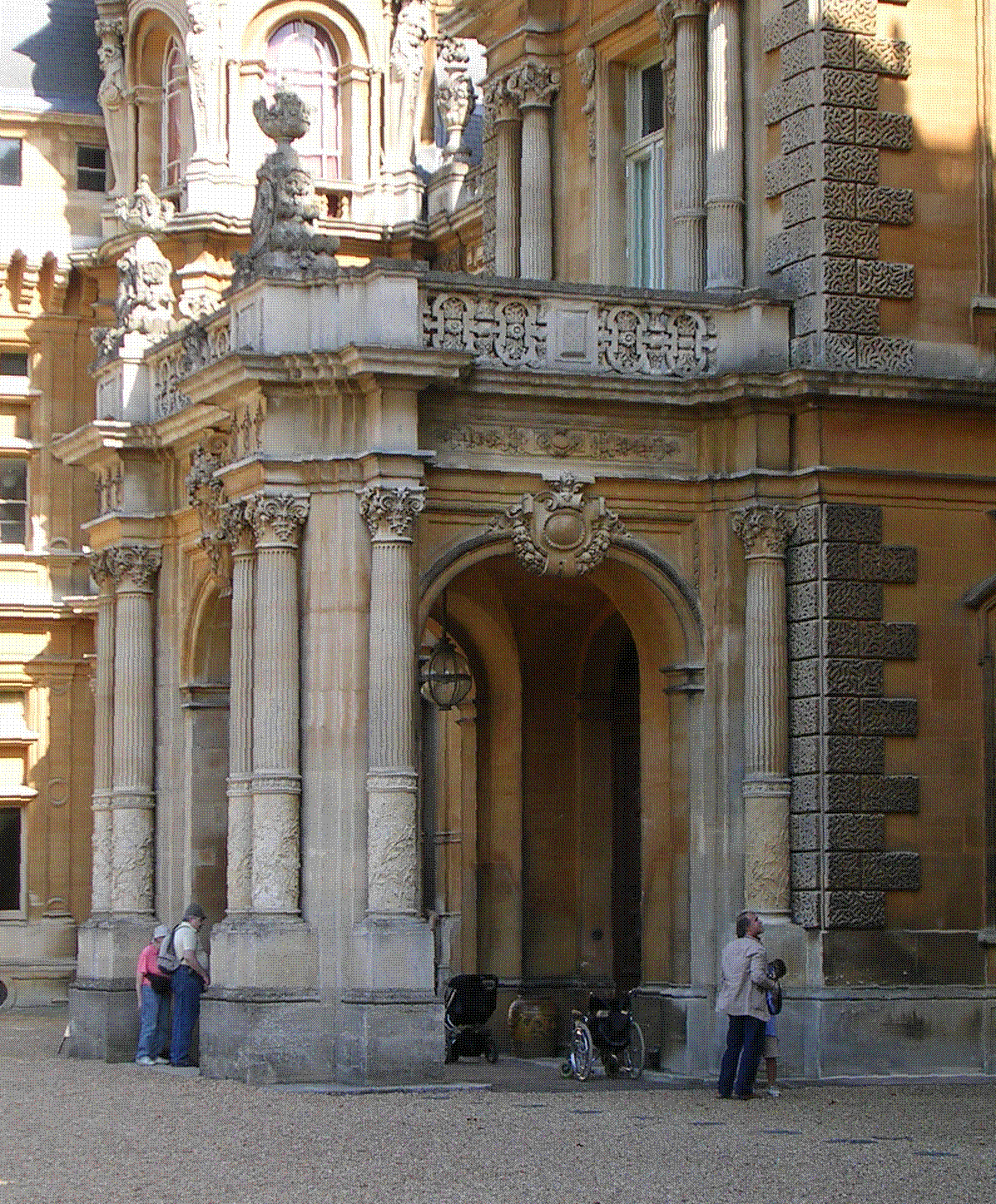
An ornate 19th-century porte-cochère, at Waddesdon Manor

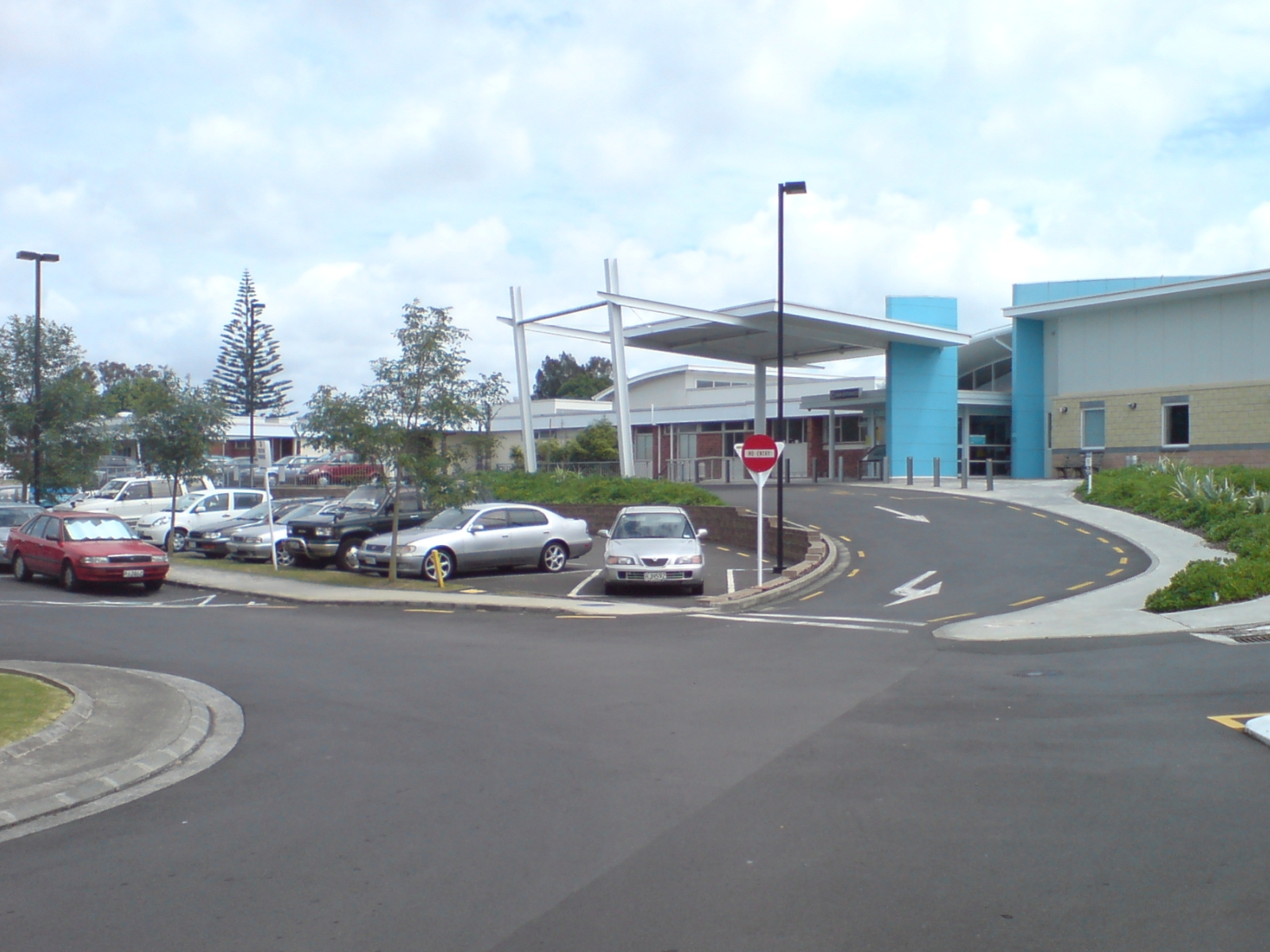
A modern example at a hospital

A porte-cochère (/ˌpɔːrt koʊˈʃɛr/; French: [pɔʁt.kɔ.ʃɛʁ]; lit. 'coach gateway'; pl. porte-cochères – pl. portes-cochères) is a doorway to a building or courtyard, "often very grand," through which vehicles can enter from the street or a covered porch-like structure at a main or secondary entrance to a building through which originally a horse and carriage and today a motor vehicle can pass to provide arriving and departing occupants protection from the elements.

Portes-cochères are still found on such structures as major public buildings and hotels, providing covered access for visitors and guests arriving by motorized transport.

A porte-cochère, a structure for vehicle passage, is to be distinguished from a portico, a columned porch or entry for human, rather than vehicular, traffic.

== History ==
The porte-cochère was a feature of many late 18th- and 19th-century mansions and public buildings. A well-known example is at Buckingham Palace in London. A portico at the White House in Washington, D.C. is often confused with a porte-cochère, where a raised vehicle ramp gives an architectural portico the functionality of the latter.

Today portes-cochères are found at both elaborate private homes and such public buildings as churches, hotels, health facilities, and schools. Portes-cochère differ from carports in that the vehicles pass through for passengers to board or exit rather than being parked beneath the covered area.

Guard stones are often found at the foot of portes-cochère, acting as protective bollards to prevent vehicles from damaging the structure.

== Gallery ==
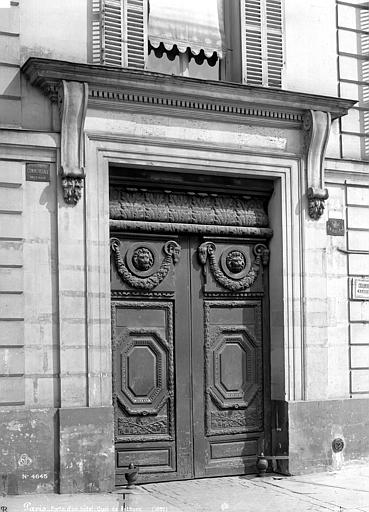
The Hôtel Hesselin in Paris (built 1642)

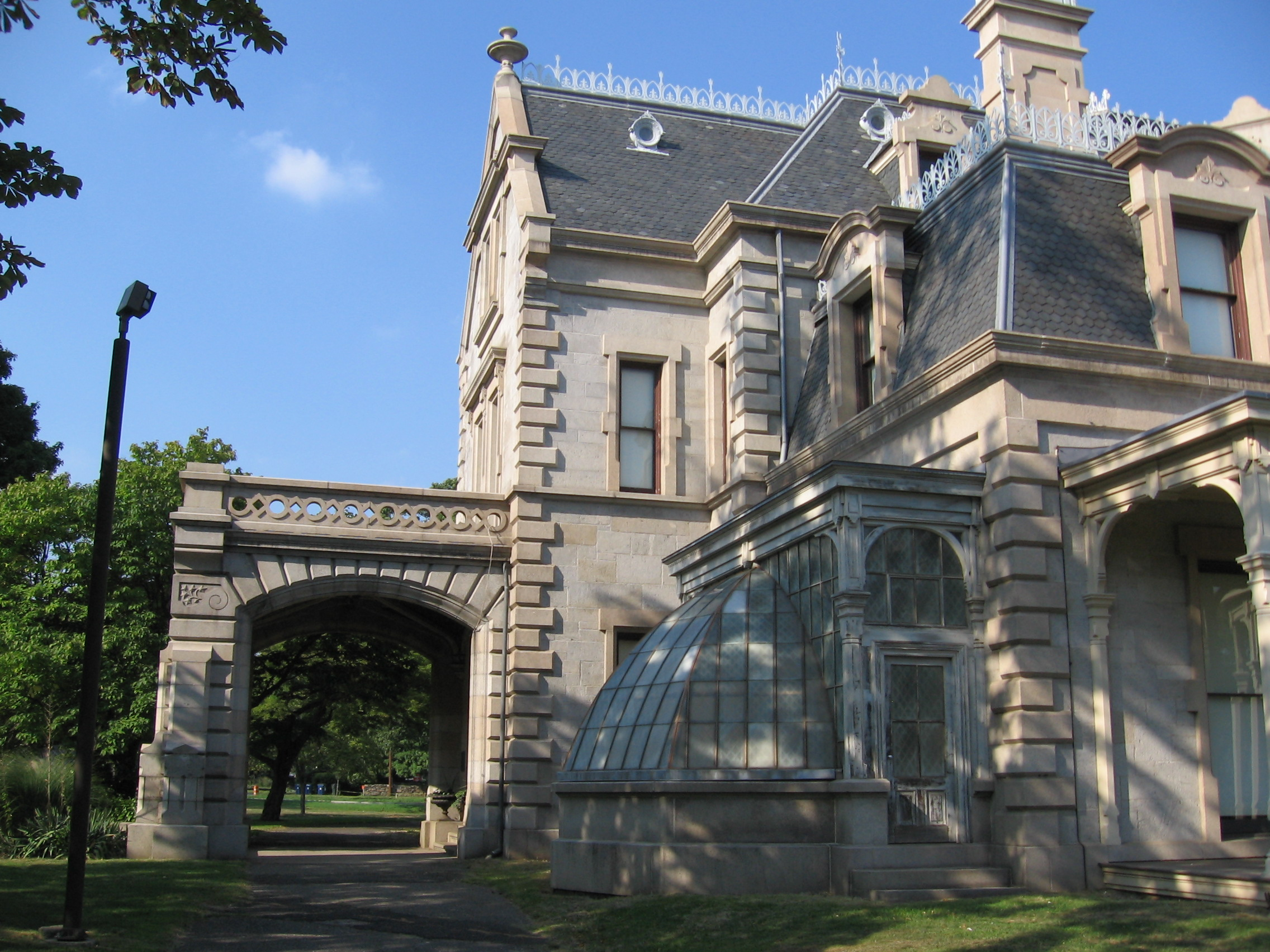
The Lockwood–Mathews Mansion (built 1864)

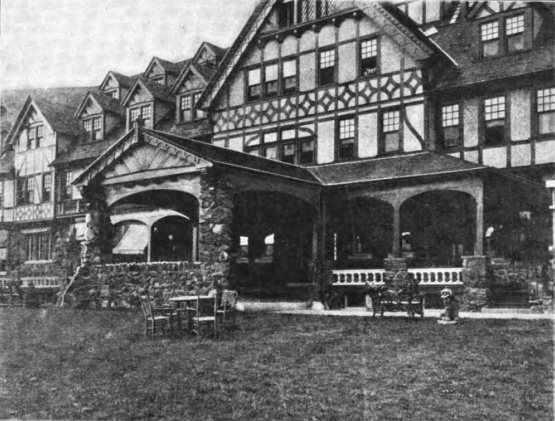
The Briarcliff Lodge (built 1902)

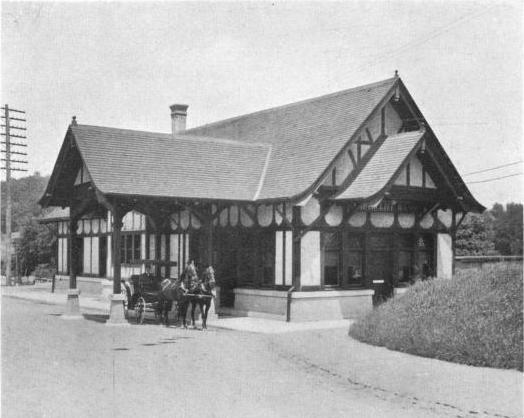
The Briarcliff Manor railroad station (built 1906)

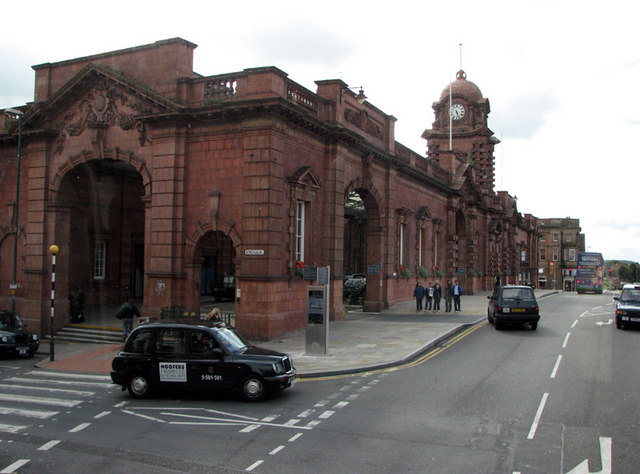
A typical railway porte-cochère at Nottingham station

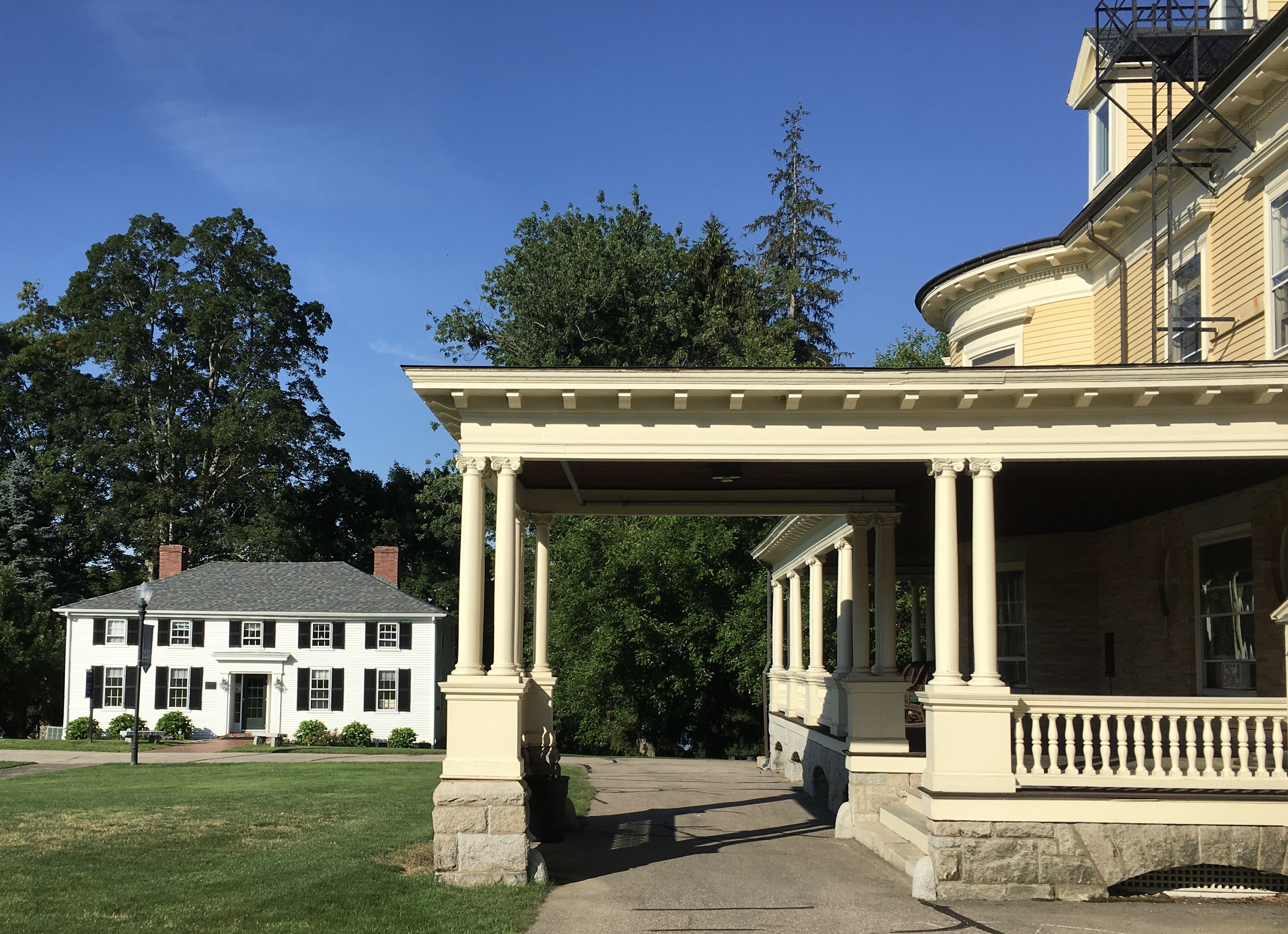
Porte-cochère at Burleigh-Davidson Building, Berwick Academy, South Berwick, Maine

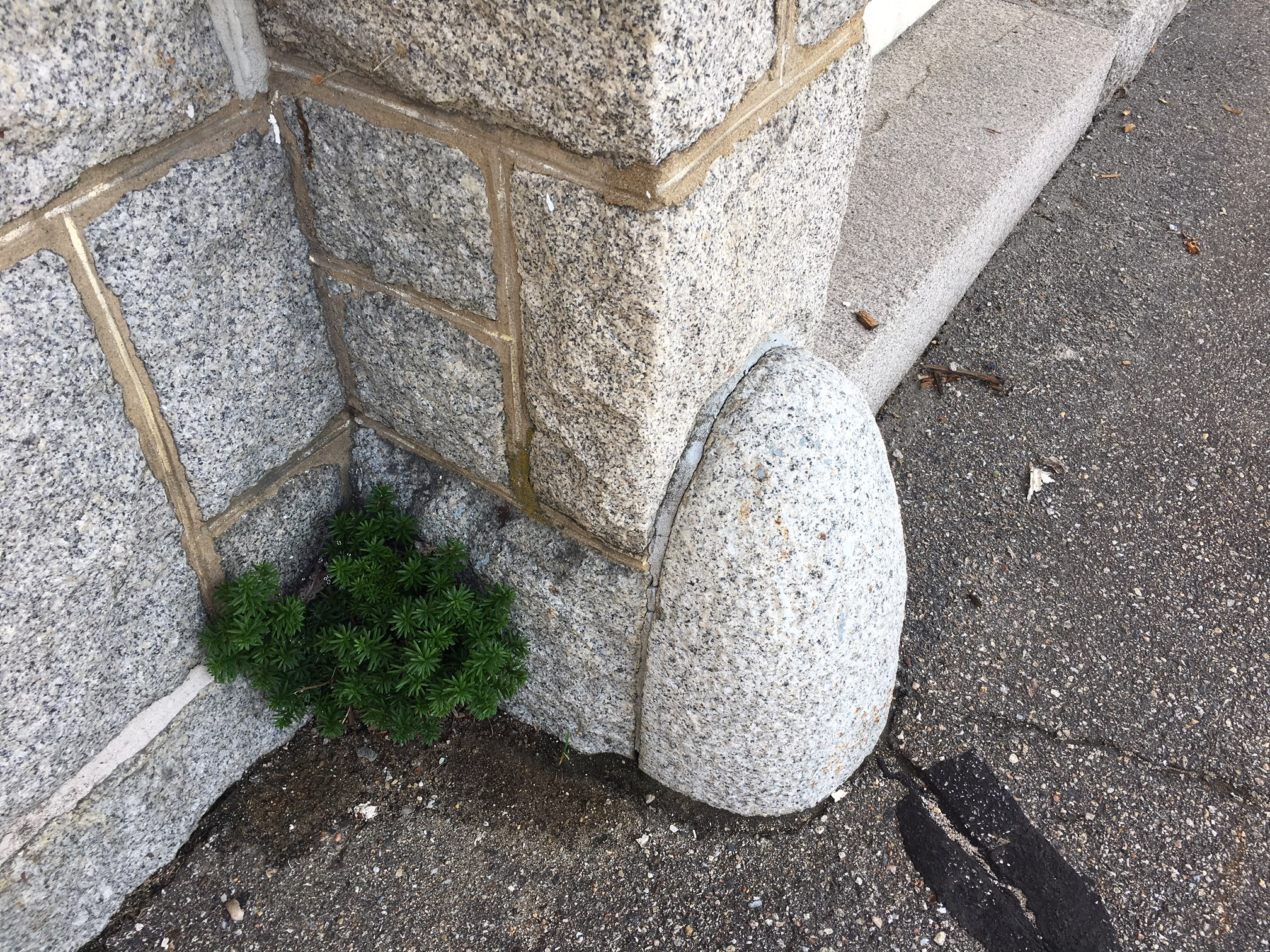
Guard stone beneath porte-cochère at the Burleigh-Davidson building, the Berwick Academy, South Berwick, Maine

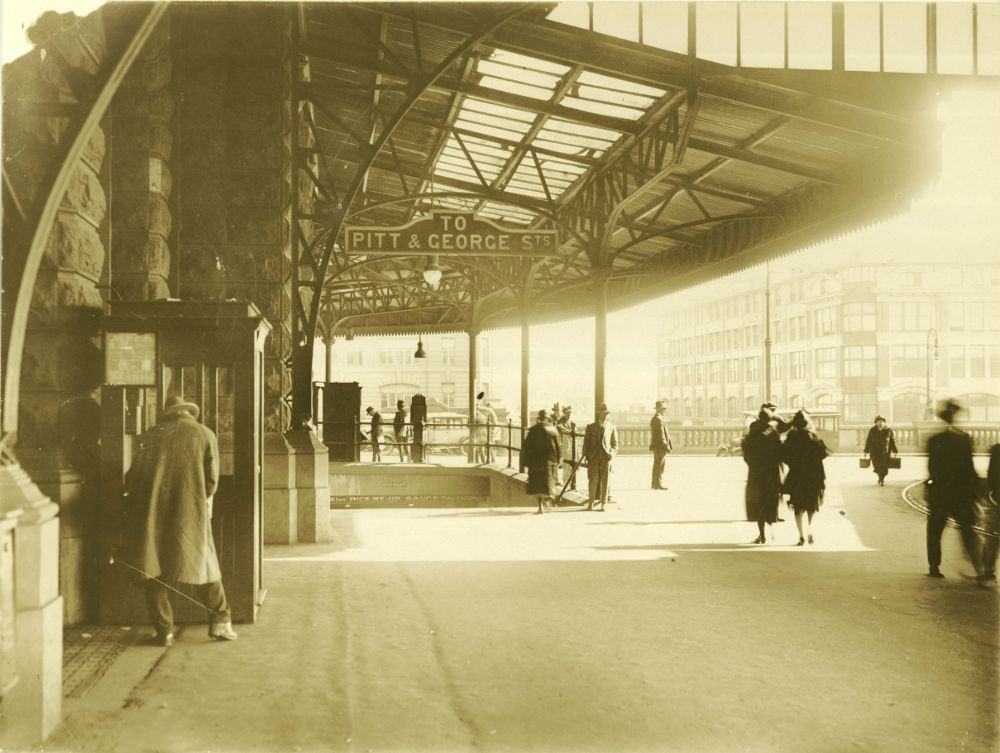
Porte-cochère at Central railway station, Sydney, 1924

== See also ==
- Glossary of architecture
