= Gypsum block =

Building material composed of solid gypsum

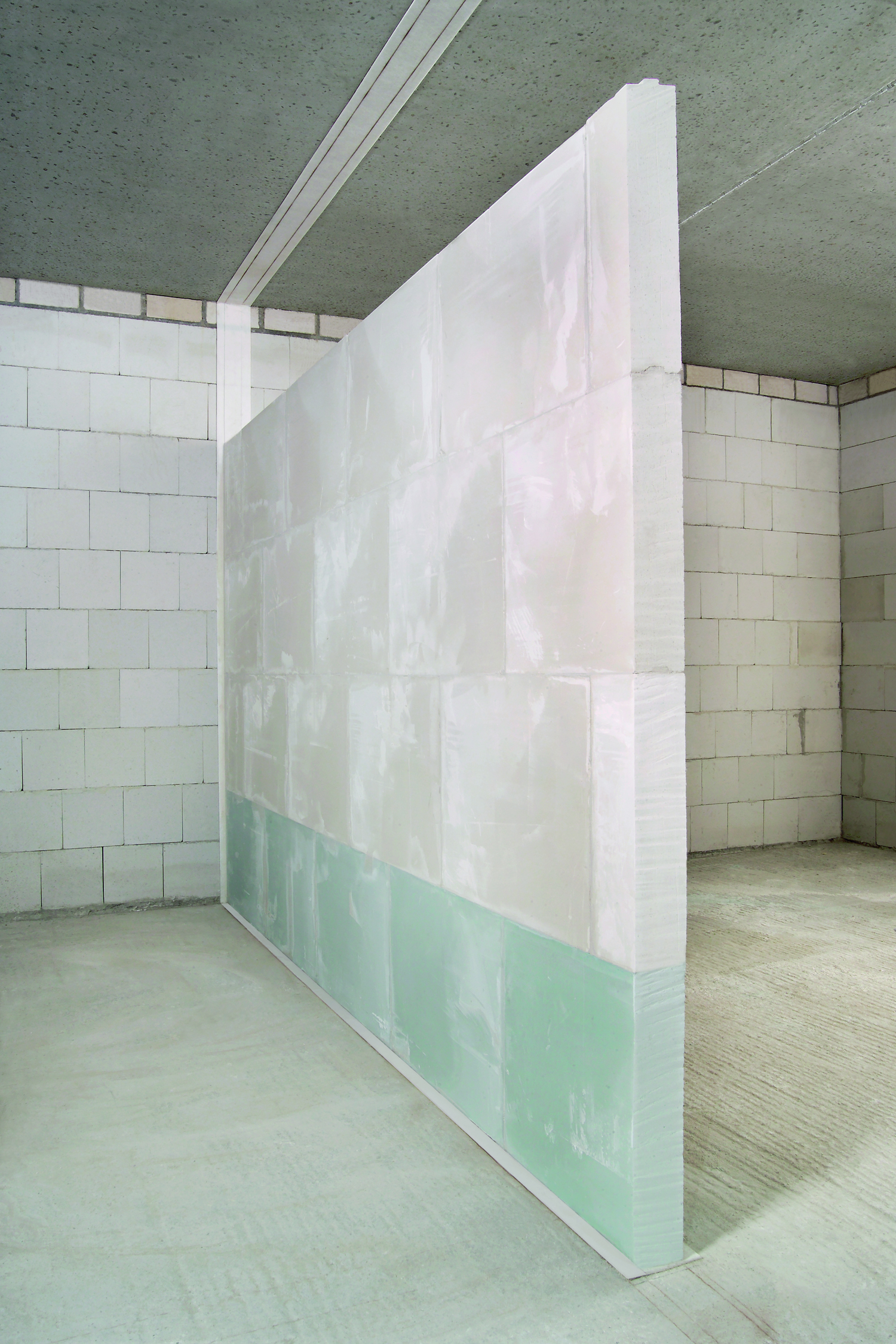
Construction of a non-load bearing partition wall of gypsum blocks

Gypsum block is a massive lightweight building material composed of solid gypsum, for building and erecting lightweight, fire-resistant, non-load bearing interior walls, partition walls, cavity walls, skin walls, and pillar casing indoors. Gypsum blocks are composed of gypsum, plaster, water and in some cases additives like vegetable or wood fiber for greater strength. Partition walls, made from gypsum blocks, require no sub-structure for erection and gypsum adhesive is used as bonding agent, not standard mortar. Because of this fundamental difference, gypsum blocks should not be confused with the thinner plasterboard (also known as wallboard or gypsum board) used for paneling stud walls.

== Manufacturing ==
A gypsum block is made of gypsum plaster and water. The manufacturing process is automated at production plants where raw gypsum (CaSO_{4}·2H_{2}O) is ground and dried, then heated to remove three-quarters of the bound water and thus transformed into calcium sulfate hemihydrate (CaSO_{4}·½H_{2}O), also known as gypsum plaster, stucco, calcined gypsum or plaster of Paris. This process is also called calcination. The plaster is then mixed with water, stirred and poured into molds to form gypsum blocks with standard formats, either solid, or with round or square open cores to reduce weight and conserve materials. Each block is moulded with tongue and groove at all sides, to enable quick and easy assembly. Still wet, the gypsum blocks are taken out of the molds and put into drying chambers. The dried gypsum blocks are packaged at the production plant and then transported to warehouses or construction sites.

== Specifications ==
Gypsum blocks are manufactured in accordance with the European and British EN 12859 Standard. The dimensions of European standard gypsum blocks are: length: 666 mm, height: 500 mm. Three blocks thus make 1 m^{2}.

Gypsum blocks vary in thickness, density and type. In the U.S. gypsum blocks were made in thicknesses of 2, 3, 4 and 6 in (51, 76, 102 and 152 mm). In Europe they are available in thicknesses of 60 mm, 70 mm, 80 mm or 100 mm. In European residential buildings regularly 80 or 100 mm thick gypsum blocks are being used.

For construction purposes especially two densities are important:

- the medium gross density of 850 kg/m^{3} to 1.100 kg/m^{3} (white coloured blocks, suitable for standard usage)
- the high gross density blocks of 1.100 kg/m^{3} to 1.500 kg/m^{3} (reddish colour, suitable for walls with higher acoustic performance requirements)

The dimensions of these blocks are: length 500 mm, height 500 mm. Four blocks thus make 1 m^{2}.

For wet areas like domestic kitchens, bathrooms and cellars water-repellent hydro blocks (mostly with a bluish colour) are available, both in medium and high gross density.

== Properties ==
Gypsum blocks combine the advantages of classical masonry with modern drywall construction. Similar to masonry, walls built with gypsum blocks are massive, void-free and of high stability. Because no mortar, sand or plaster are used, the walls are (almost) built without water, like drywalls. To distinguish this kind of construction from conventional drywalls with wall studs and gypsum panels or gypsum fiber boards, the construction with gypsum blocks is often referred to as massive drywall construction.

Due to the grammage of about 54 kg/m^{2} to 120 kg/m^{2}, non-bearing partition walls out of gypsum blocks fall into the category of lightweight partition walls. Due to the construction technique they are stable solid walls with a high resistance to mechanical strain, which reduces maintenance and repair.

== Fire resistance rating ==
Gypsum is a mineral and non-combustible building material (a class A1 building material in accordance with the German DIN 4102, the European EN 13501 or the British BS 476 or the American ASTM E119) consisting of calcium sulphate dihydrate (CaSO_{4}·2H_{2}O). Because of the stored water, gypsum is a good fire protection building material. In the event of fire, the water crystals vaporize, actively slowing the spread of the fire.

Massive gypsum blocks have a high level of passive fire protection: 60 mm thickness offers 30 minutes of fire resistance (F30-A in accordance with the German DIN 4102 standard, the European EN 13501 or the British BS 476); 80 mm thickness offers 2 hours of fire resistance (F120-A); and 100 mm thickness offers 3 hours of fire resistance (F180-A). The fire resistance ratings for the US are similar.

== Sound proof properties ==
To improve the sound proof qualities of gypsum block partition walls, insulation strips are used on all sides to connect the partition walls to adjacent walls, ceilings and floors. The acoustic decoupling of the walls in this way reduces the acoustic transmissions of these lightweight partition walls significantly.

== Construction techniques ==
Gypsum blocks are typically laid in a compatible gypsum mortar or adhesive, then covered with a coat of finish plaster. Materials are classified according to the requirements of ASTM standard C52.

== Difference U.S. and Europe ==
In the U.S. gypsum blocks were commonly used in the early 20th century (1900–1926), but at the end of the 1920s had largely been replaced by gypsum wallboards, concrete masonry units and framed gypsum drywall partitions. Gypsum blocks are no longer manufactured in the United States. In Europe gypsum blocks are still widely used and are gaining popularity as a building material with very low emissions of volatile organic compounds, extremely low radiation values and a neutral pH value that contribute to a healthy living environment.

== See also ==
- Structural clay tile
- Passive fire protection
- Drywall
