= Guard stone =

Projecting element to protect a structure

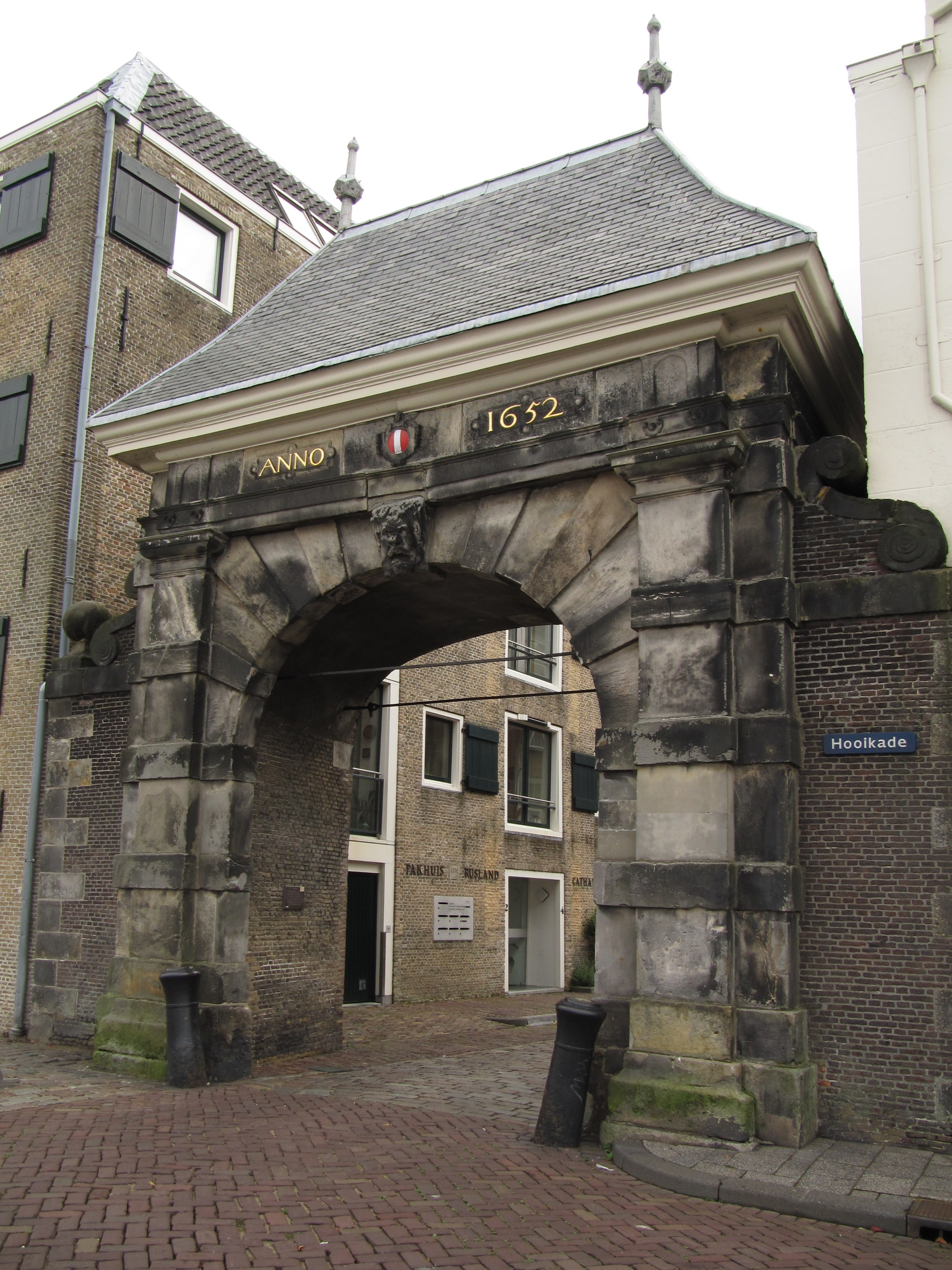
Obsolete cannons were often used as wheel guards in the Netherlands, such as for the Catherine's gate in Dordrecht.

A guard stone, jostle stone or chasse-roue (French, lit. 'wheel chaser'), is a projecting metal, concrete, or stone exterior architectural element located at the corner and/or foot of gates, portes-cochères, garage entries, and walls to prevent damage from vehicle tires and wheels.

== Description ==
Guard stones were developed as an item of street furniture during the era of horse-drawn vehicles, but some are still in use today. They are sometimes used as traffic bollards, but are generally positioned to protect a specific object, such as a corner of a building or the side of a gate. In Paris, they are usually metal in the shape of an arc, ball or cone. There are also models in hard stone with a sloping back to guide errant wheels away from impacting a building. Guard stones made of stone were sometimes surrounded by a metal ring to reduce wear.

The wheels, including the hub, of horse-drawn vehicles protrude beyond the vehicle's body, and are thus prone to collide with and damage a corner of a building or gate. Today, early guard stones are considered cultural heritage objects and some countries, such as France and Belgium, even protect them under specific heritage regulations.

In many cities older guard stones have been replaced by objects designed for automobile traffic, such as curbs and guard rails. In due course guard stones became obsolete and were discarded or reused for other city purposes. When they had been incorporated as part of a building's structure, however, they proved difficult to remove; thus many remain as silent witnesses to early traffic on historic roads. Today such objects are treasured for historical reasons and are often protected as part of a town or city's cultural heritage.

== Applications ==
- Farmyard entry doors, subject to traffic by heavy horse-drawn carts.
- Wall corners at the intersection of two city streets (without pavements). In this case, they were often built into the wall.
- Guard stones made in Haussmann's renovation of Paris.
- Turns in rural roads or along parapets of bridges.
- At turns or at intervals on a mountainous ascent. These also helped the coachman to keep the vehicle from rolling backwards, while it paused to let the horses catch their breath.

== Gallery ==
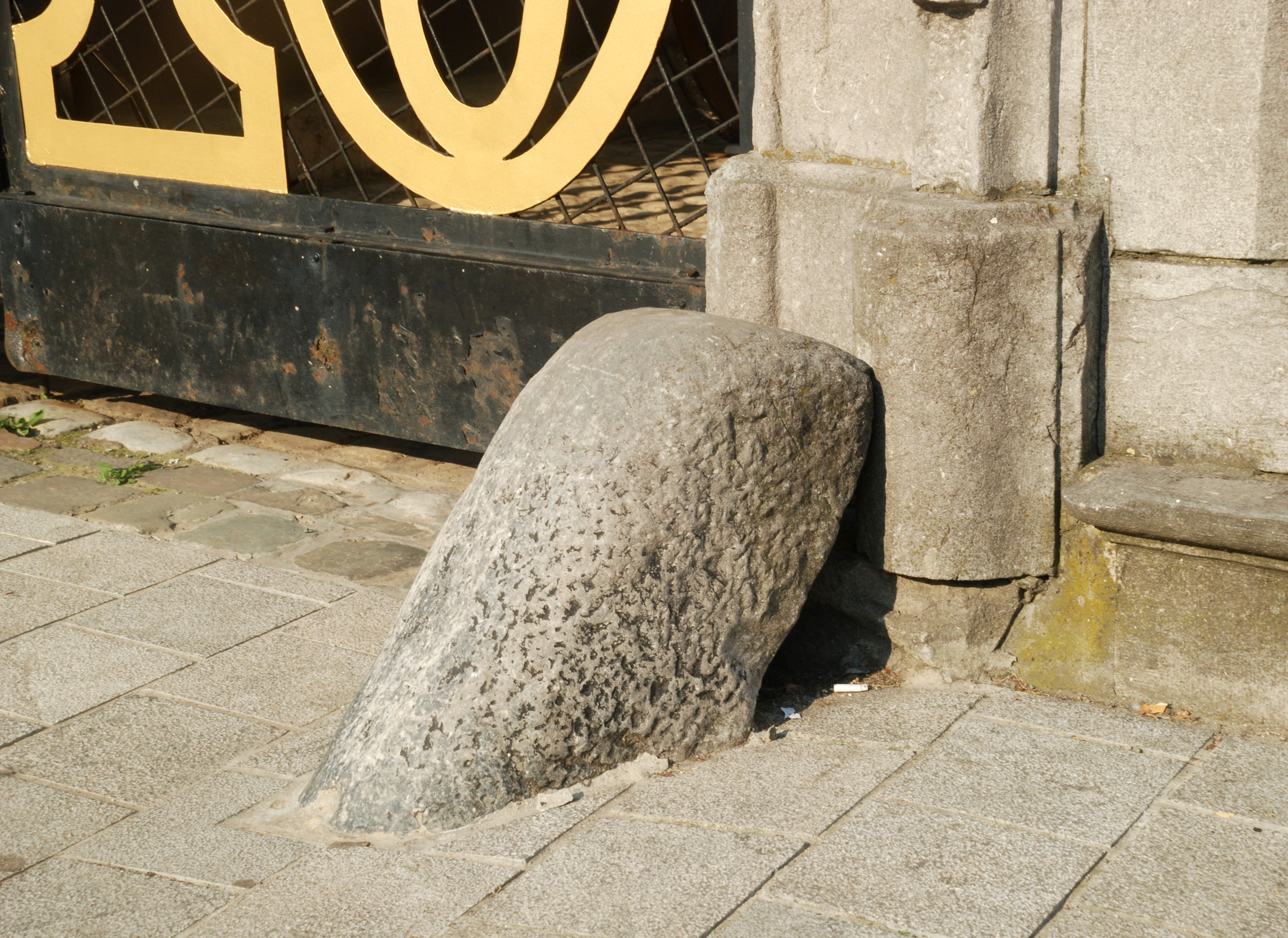
Guard stone of the Wellington Museum in Waterloo (Belgium)

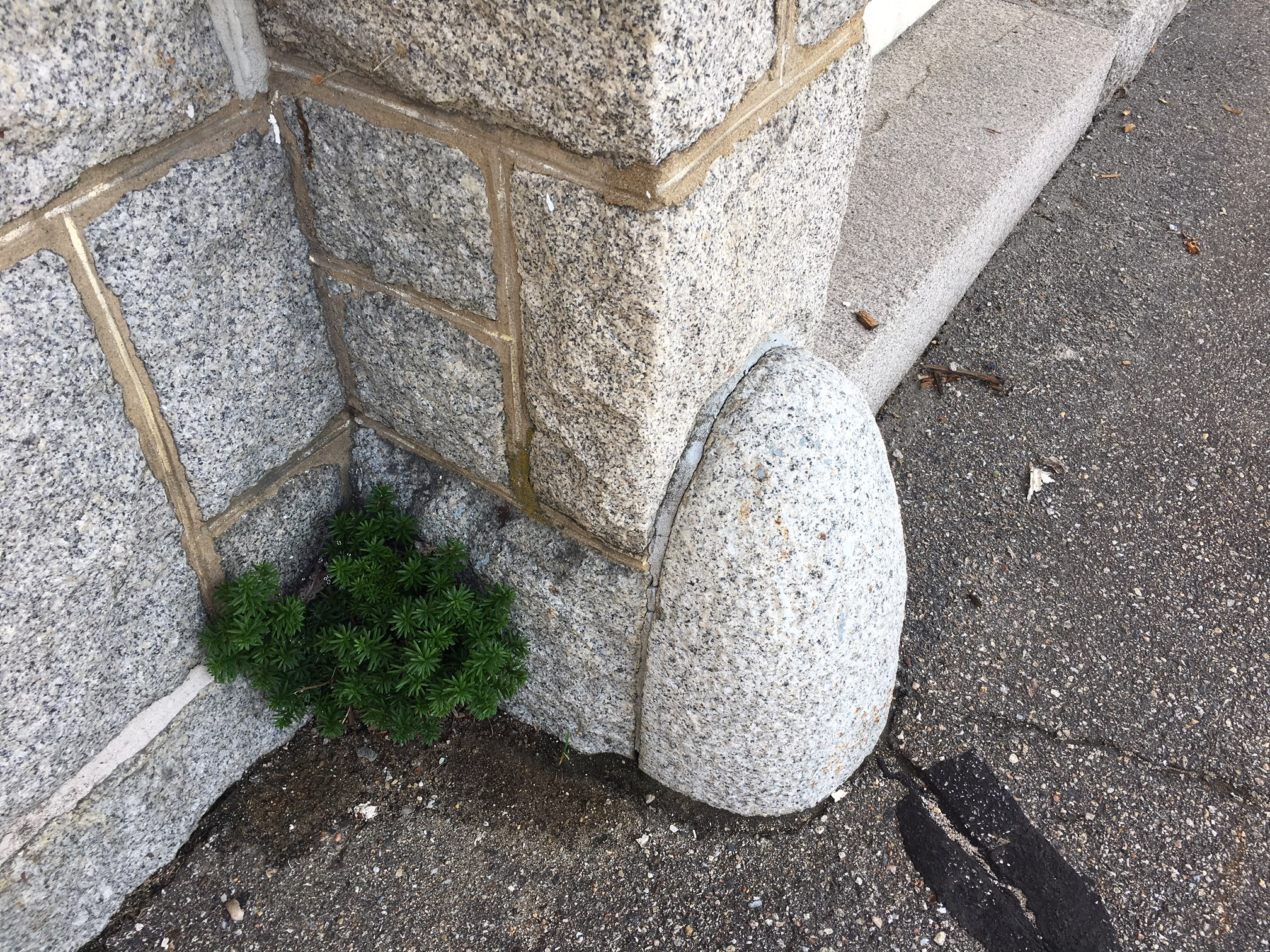
Guard stone beneath porte-cochère at the Burleigh-Davidson building, the Berwick Academy, South Berwick, Maine

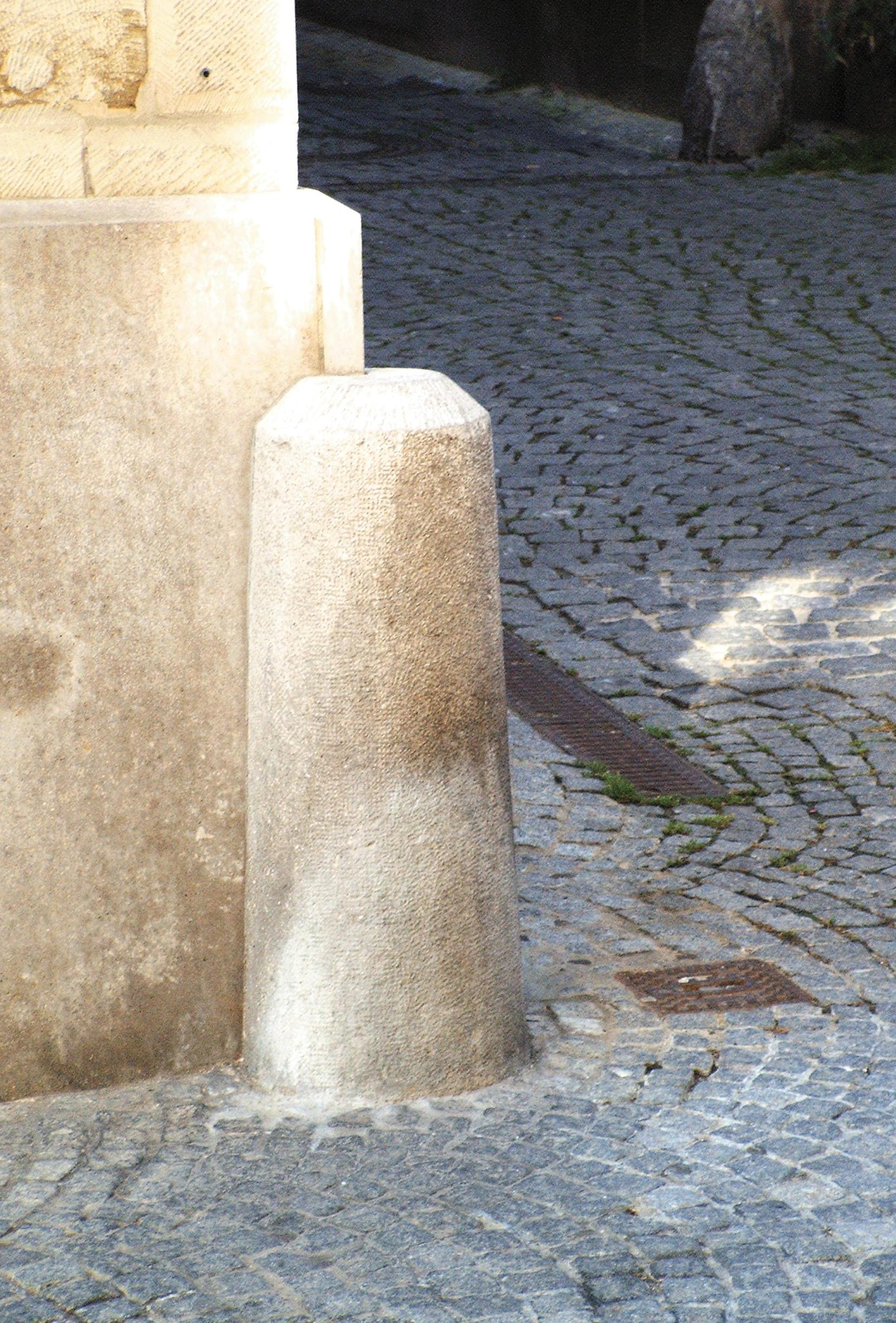
A guard stone in Kitzingen, Germany

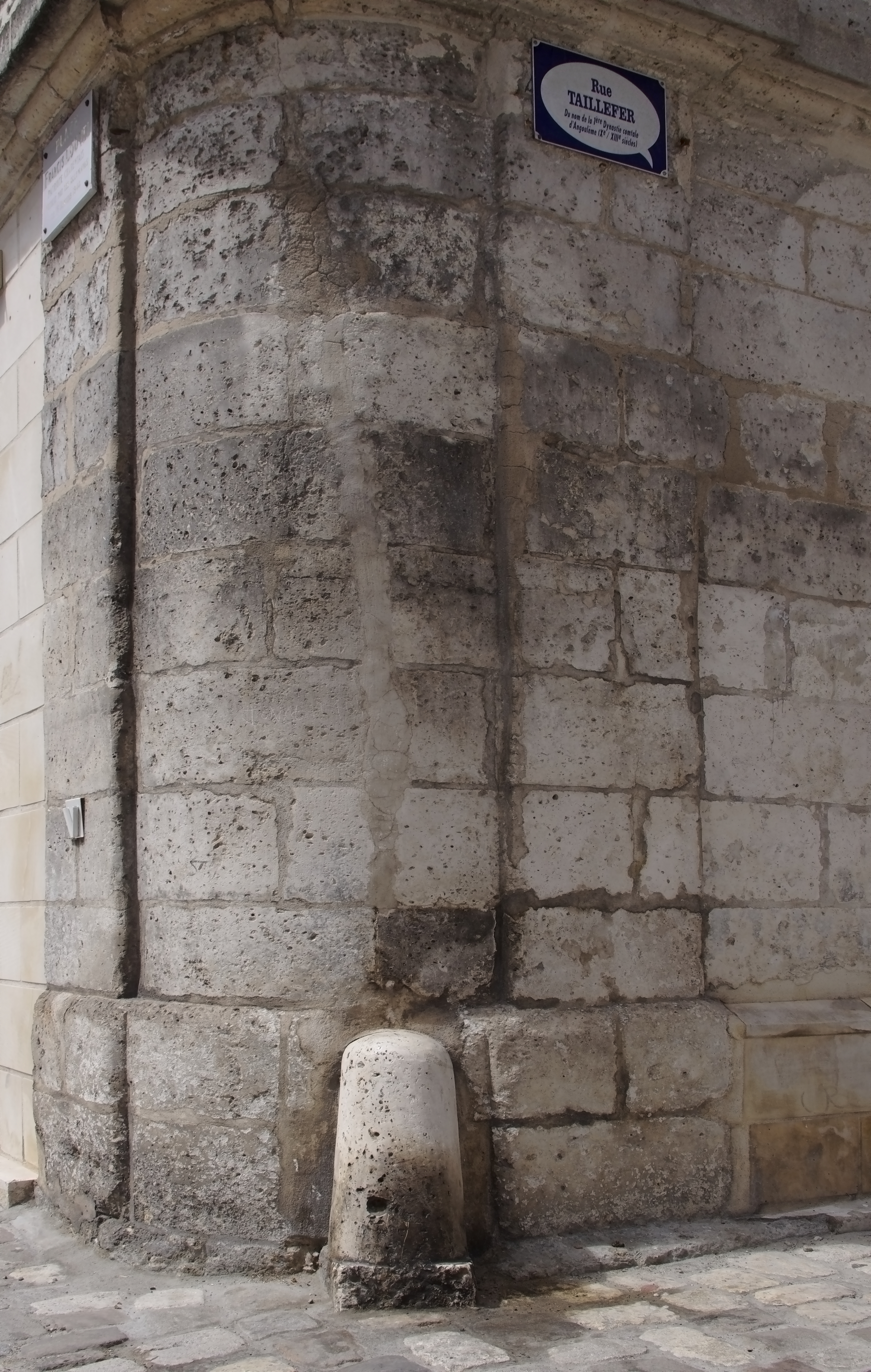
Guard-stone in Angoulême, France

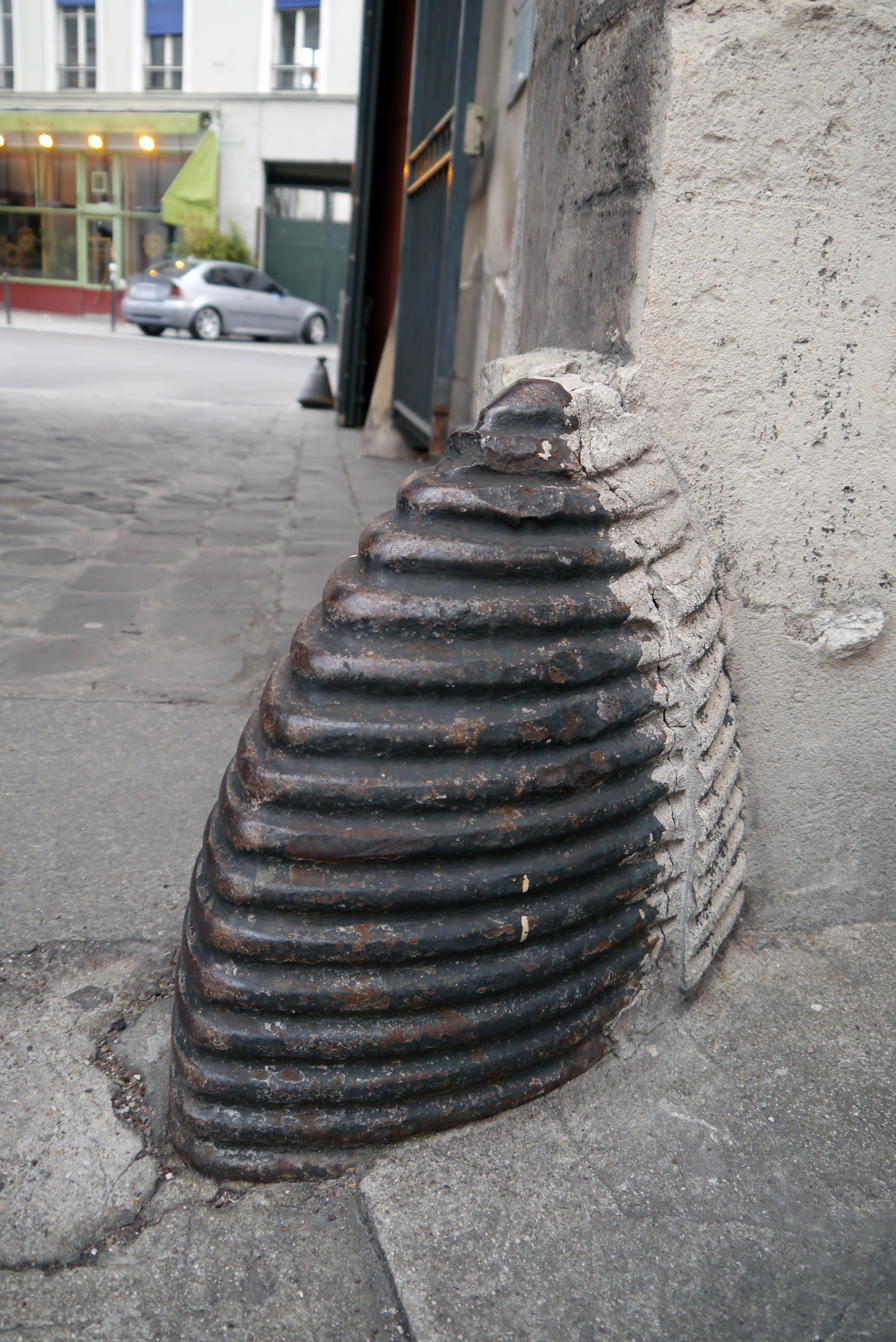
Corner chasse-roue in Paris

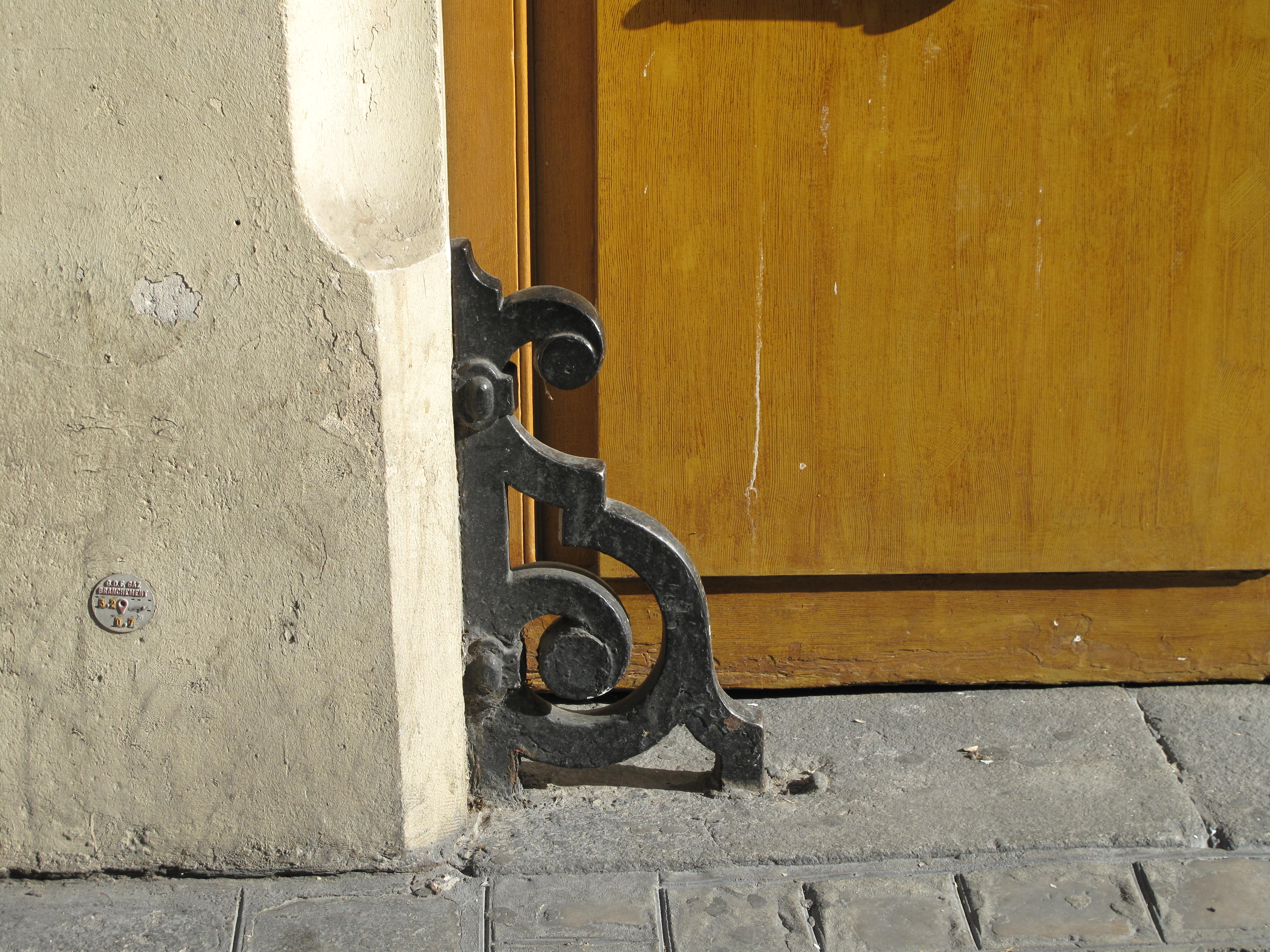
Haussmannian guard stone

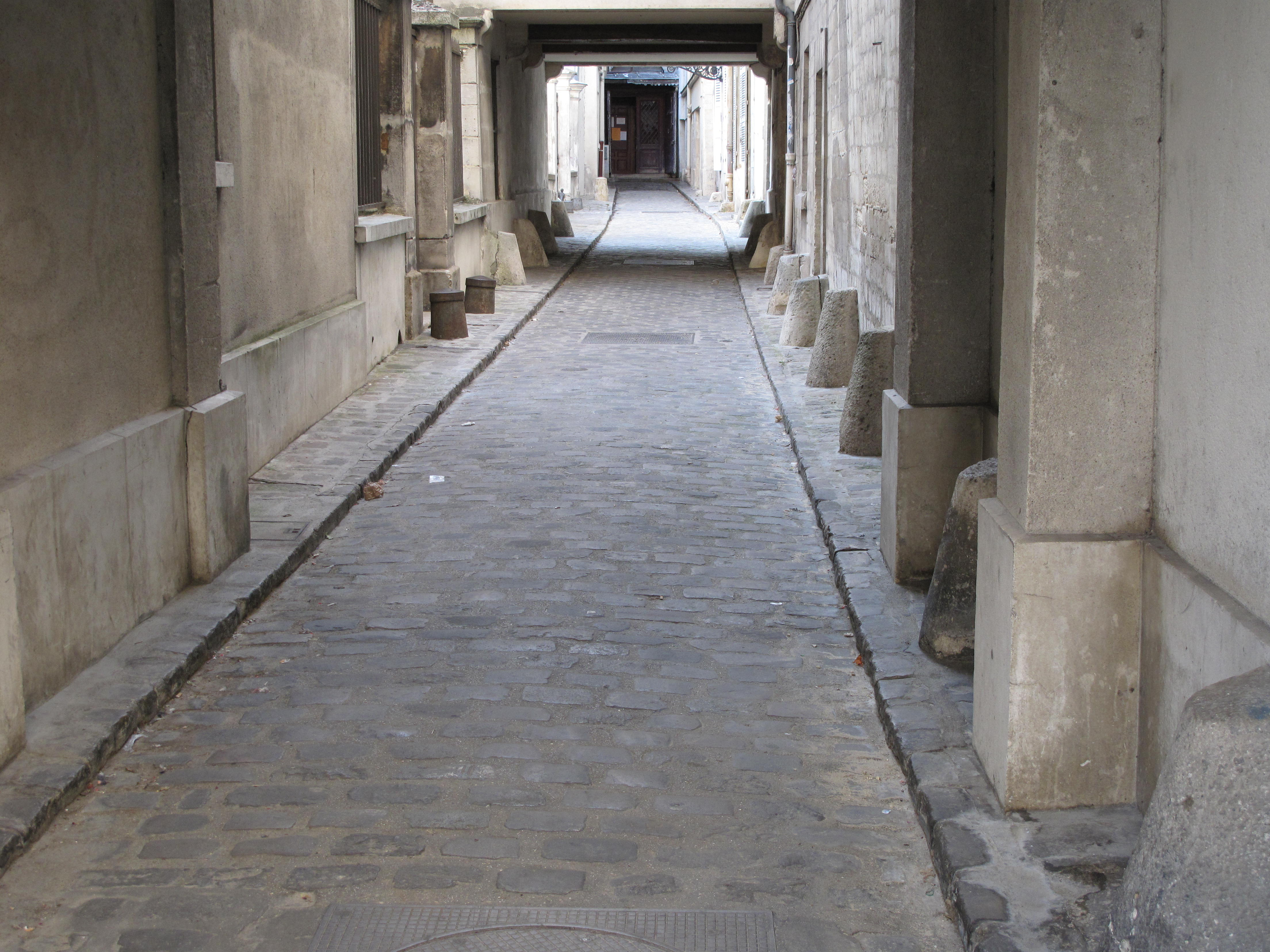
Passage Saint-Paul, Paris

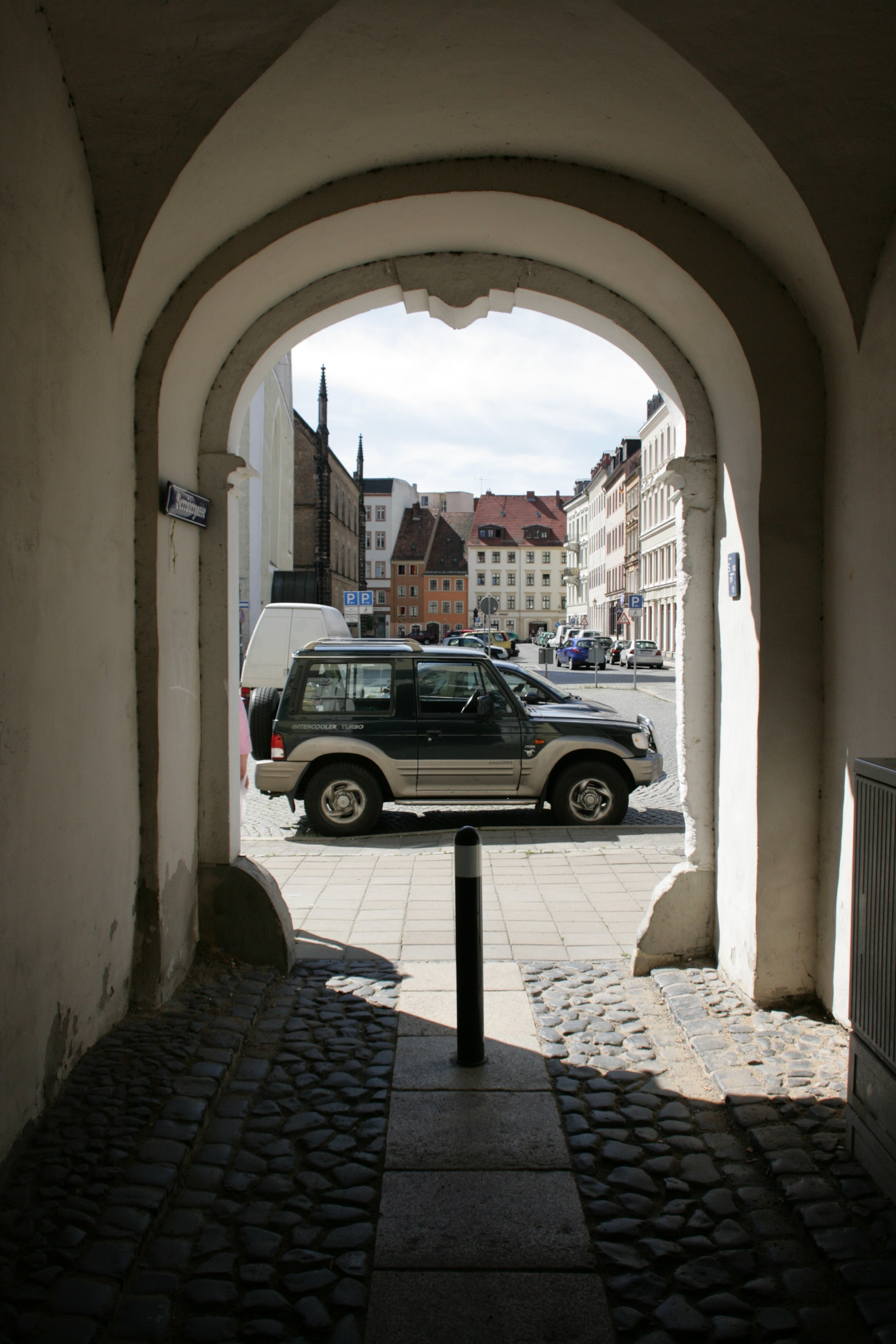
In Germany, this traffic bollard has made the surrounding guard stones redundant

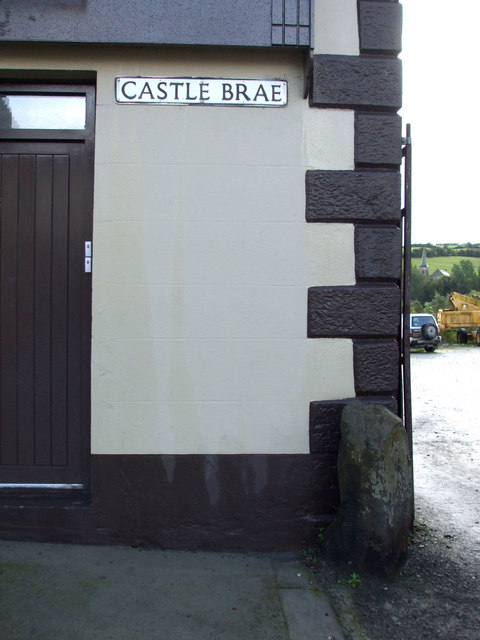
Deflecting stone in Northern Ireland

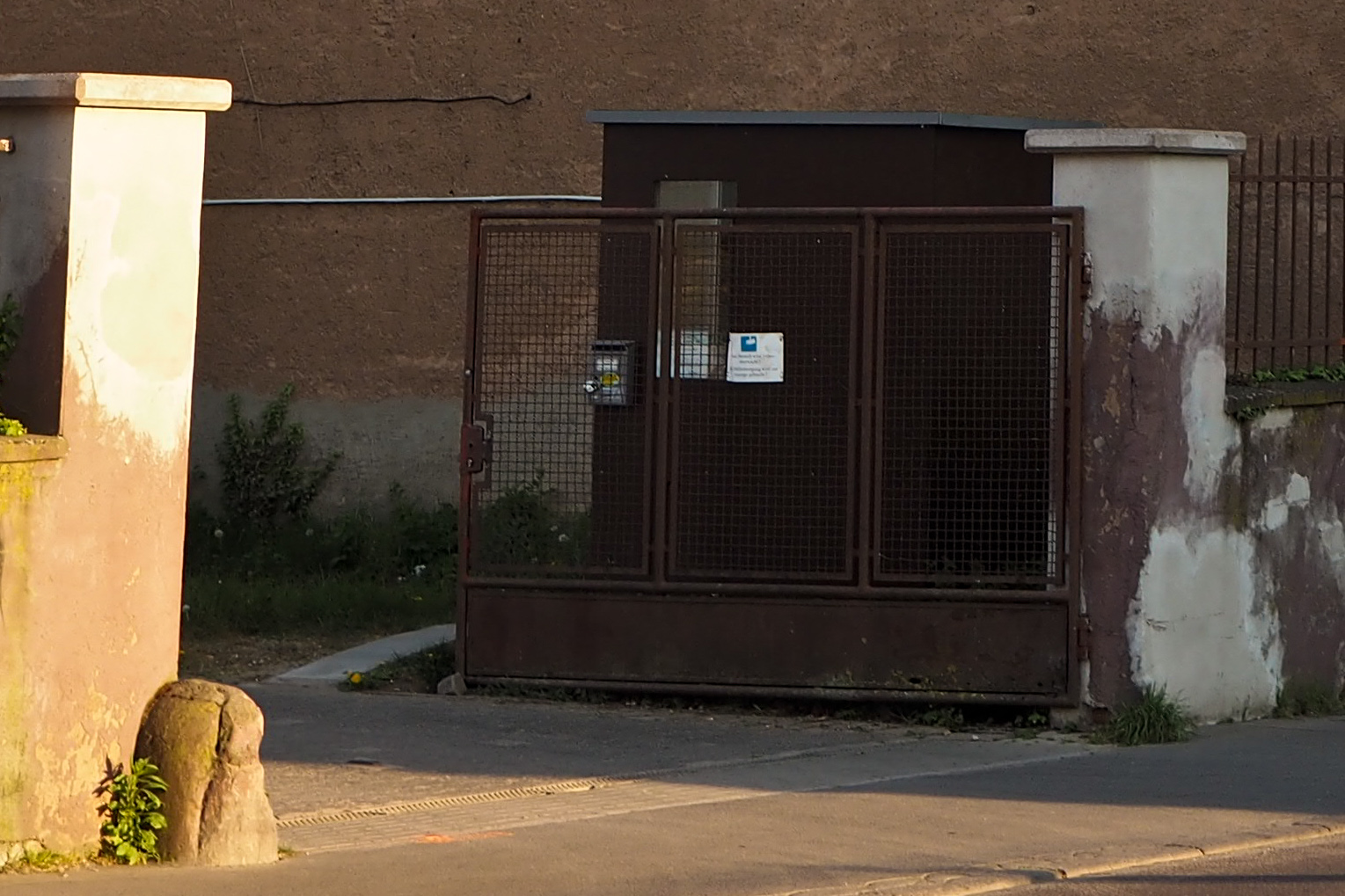
Gate with guard stone in Trier, Germany

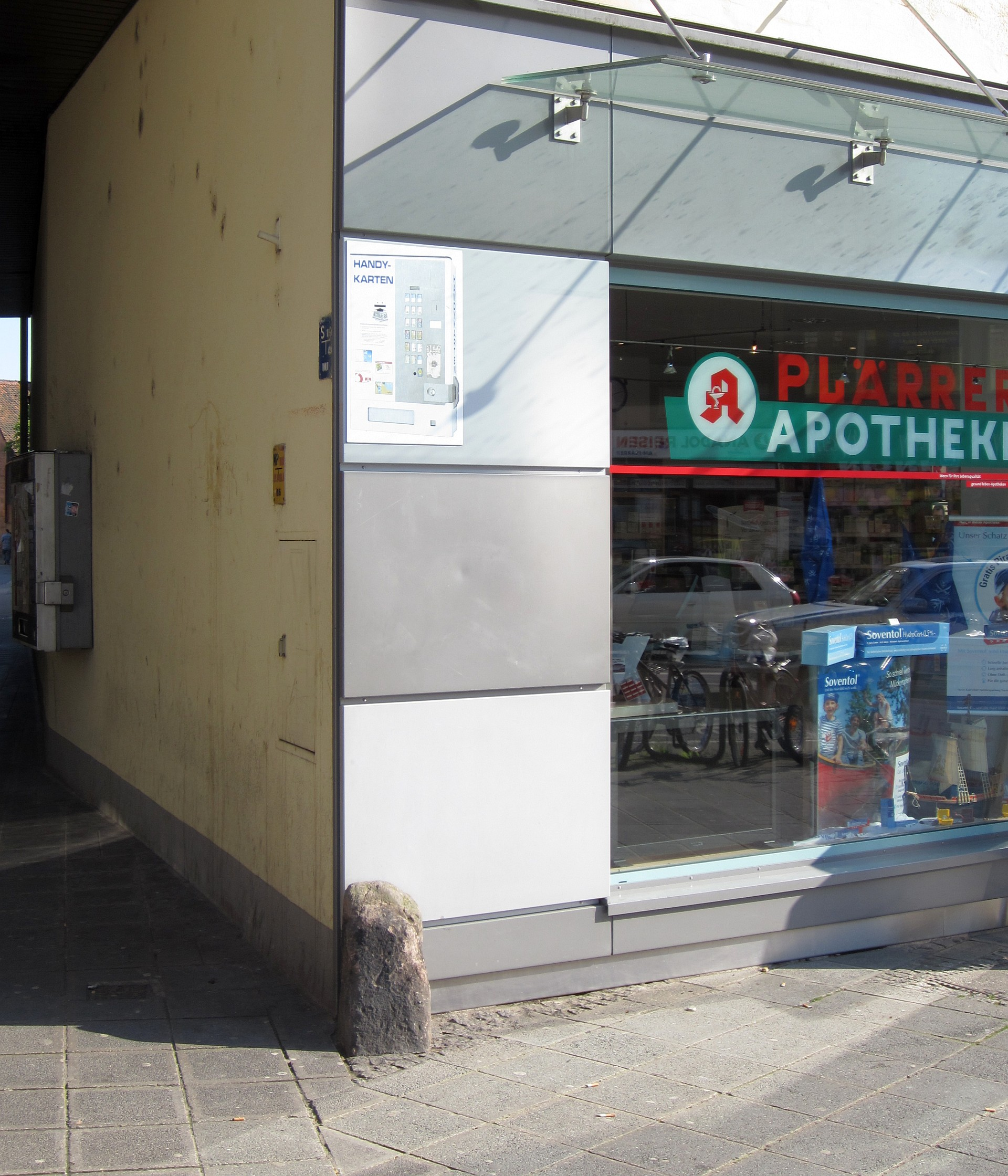
Guard stone still in place at a modern façade in Nuremberg city centre
