= Concrete block =

Standard-sized block used in construction

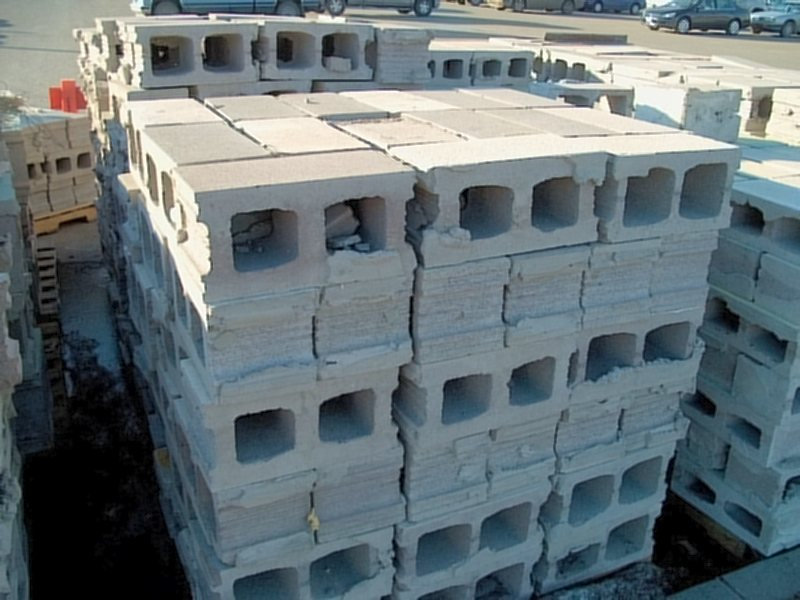
A pallet of "8-inch" concrete blocks

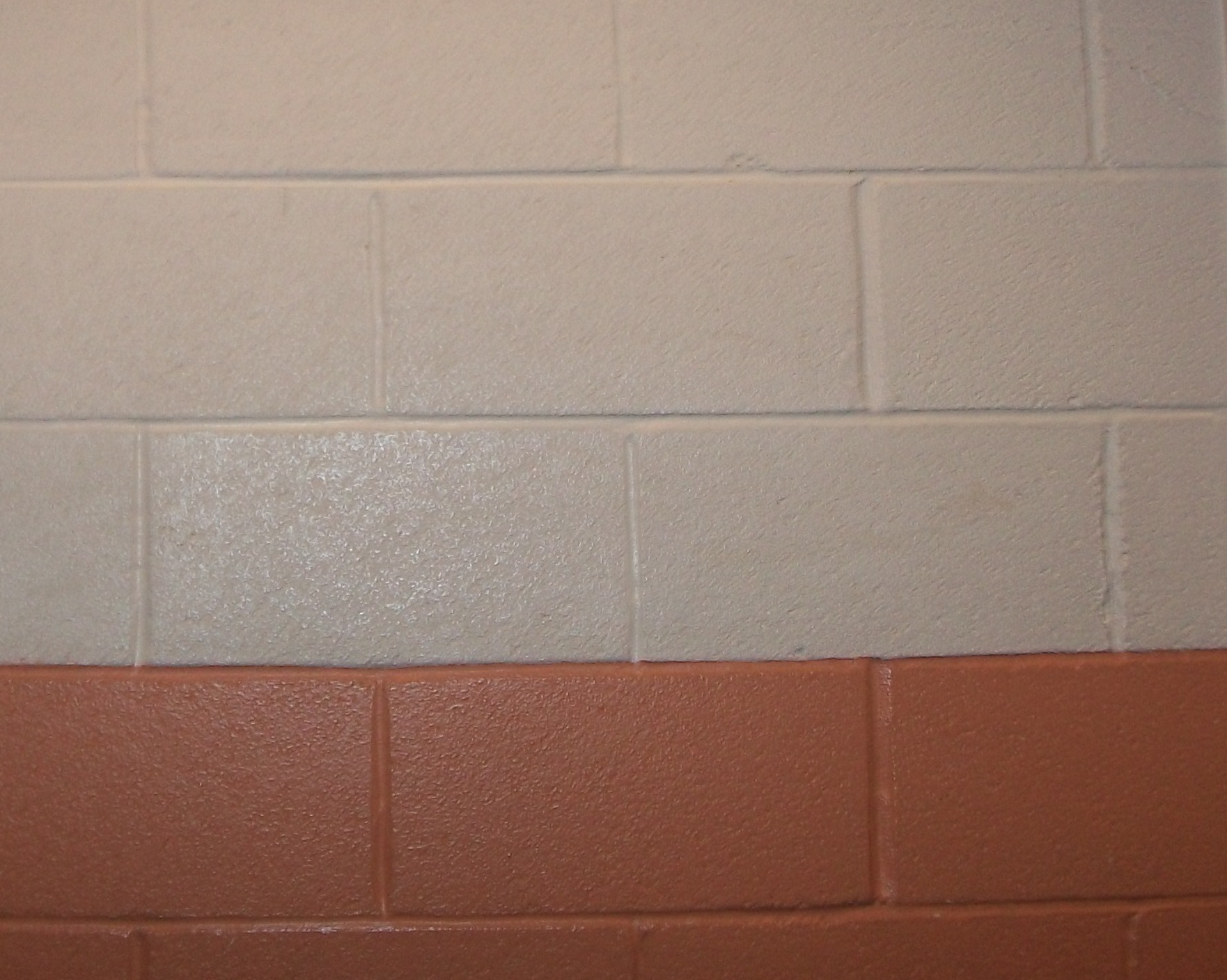
An interior wall of painted concrete blocks

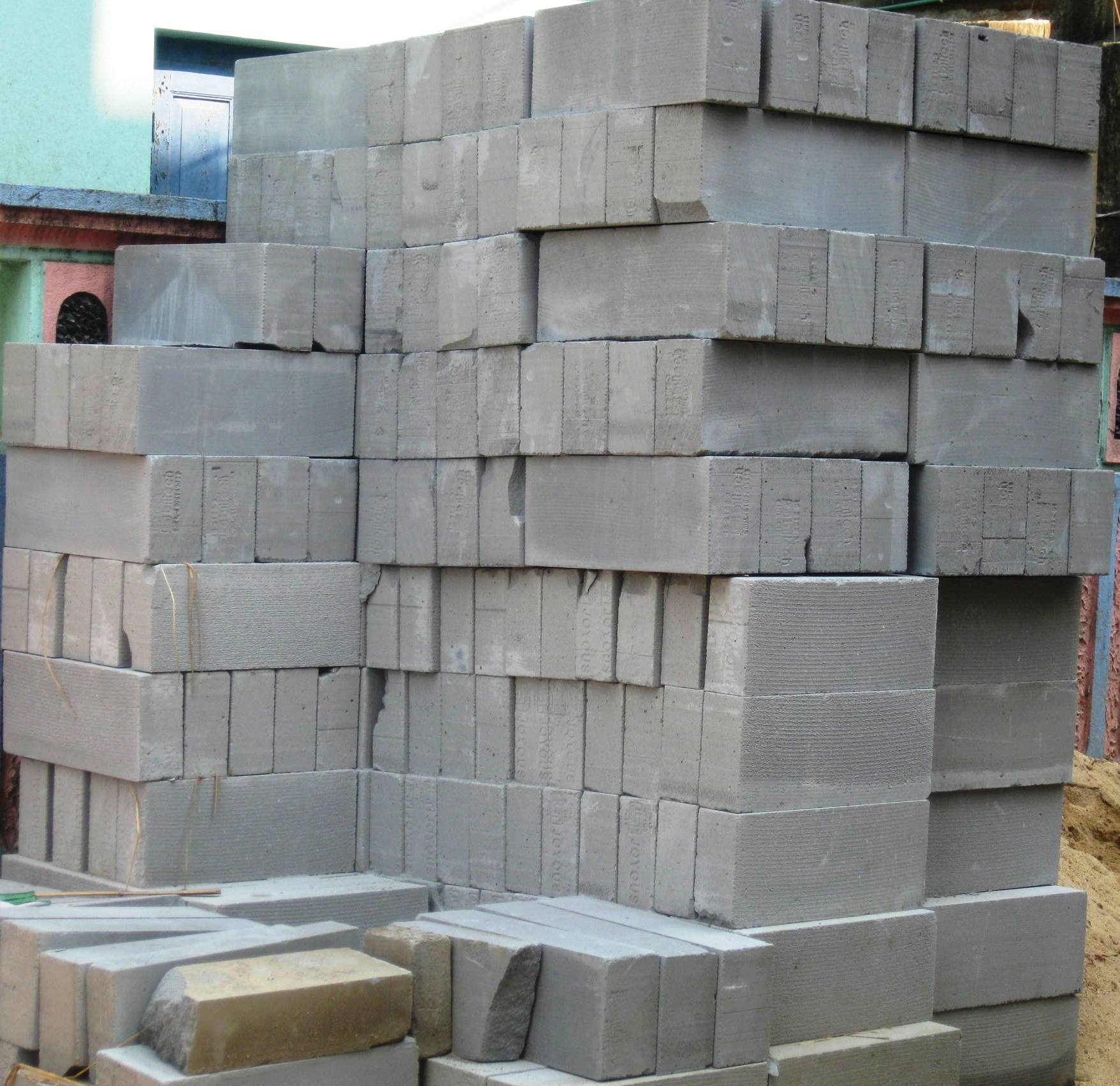
Concrete masonry blocks

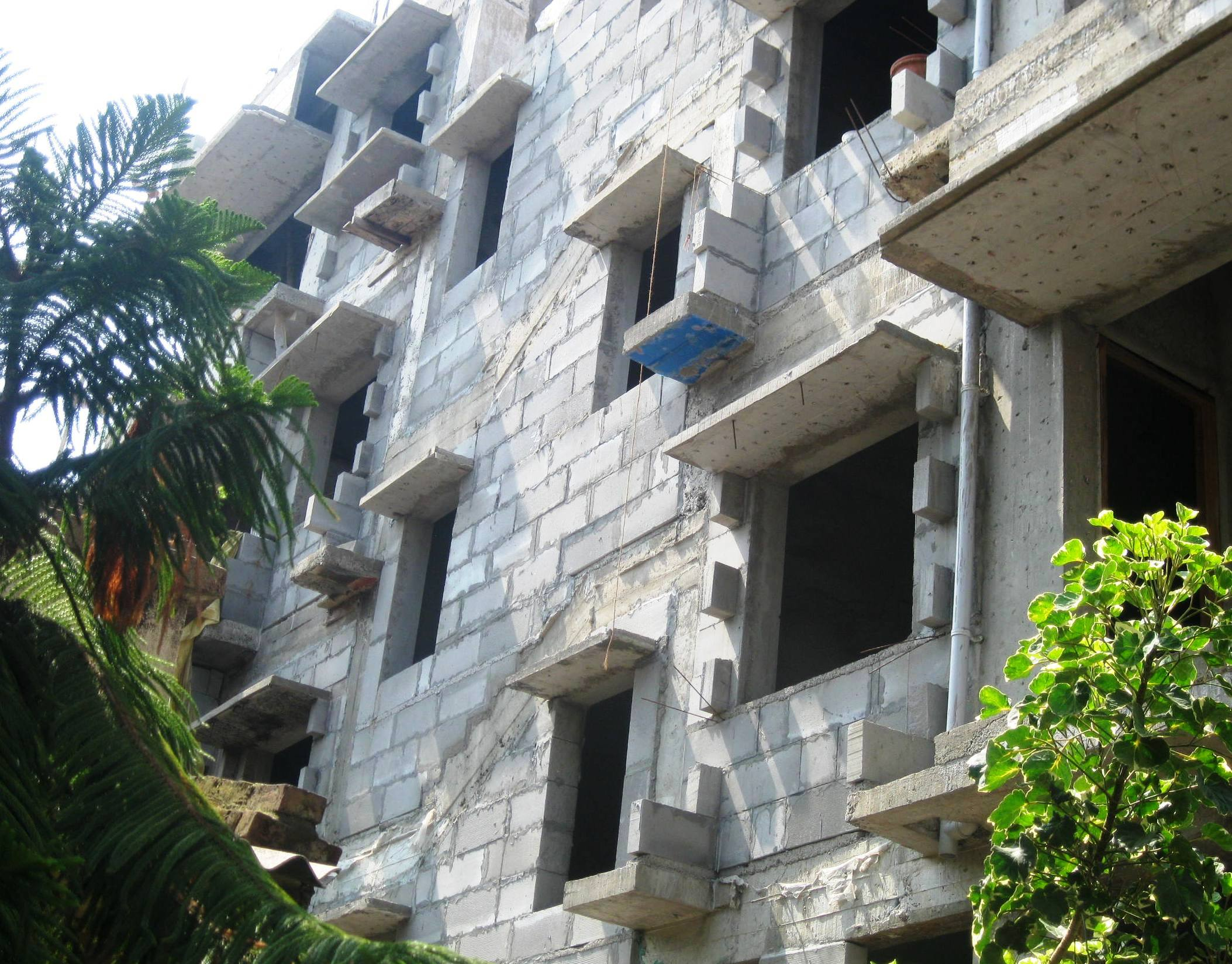
A building constructed with concrete masonry blocks, Kolkata, West Bengal, India

A concrete block, also known as a cinder block in North American English, breeze block in British English, or concrete masonry unit (CMU), or by various other terms, is a standard-size rectangular block used in building construction. The use of blockwork allows structures to be built in the traditional masonry style with layers (or courses) of staggered blocks.

Concrete blocks may be produced with hollow centers (cores) to reduce weight, improve insulation and provide an interconnected void into which concrete can be poured to solidify the entire wall after it is built.

Concrete blocks are considered versatile building products because of the wide variety of appearances that can be achieved using them.

== Naming ==
Due to common addition of cinder admixtures (cementitious fly ash and/or aggregate bottom ash), CMU blocks are commonly called cinder blocks in the United States. They are also known as breeze blocks, a term derived from breeze, referring to the small cinders and cinder-dust that are created by partially burned coal. However, in the United States breeze blocks also refers specifically to decorative blocks used on exterior walls to allow the breeze through, which were an important feature of Mid-Century Modern design, popularised by Edward Durrell Stone.

In Australia, they are often known as besser blocks (because the Besser Company was a major supplier of machines that made concrete blocks), and also as grey blocks or concrete masonry units (CMUs).

Due to its visual similarity to compressed blocks, concrete blocks are also called briquette, briquet (Briket in Turkish) as well.

Clinker blocks use clinker (ash created as a waste product from impurities in minerals such as coal, limestone and iron ore), also called slag.

== Composition ==
Concrete blocks are made from cast concrete (e.g. portland cement and aggregate, usually sand and fine gravel, for high-density blocks). In the western United States, where they are easily obtainable, porous lava rock gravels are used for weight reduction. They also have an added decorative effect to certain types of block, such as split-face, due to their distinct red and black colors. Lower-density blocks may use industrial wastes, such as fly ash or bottom ash, as an aggregate.

Recycled materials, such as post-consumer glass, slag cement, or recycled aggregate, are often used in the composition of the blocks. Use of recycled materials within blocks can create different appearances in the block, such as a terrazzo finish, and may help the finished structure earn LEED certification.

Lightweight blocks can also be produced using autoclaved aerated concrete; these are widely used for construction in Finland and other Scandinavian countries, as well as in the UK and central Europe, for the material's inherent thermal insulation characteristics, as are expanded clay aggregate blocks.

== Sizes and structure ==
Blocks come in modular sizes, with the most popular typically referred to (by their thickness) as "4-inch", "6-inch", "8-inch", and "12-inch". In the US, concrete blocks are nominally 16 in (410 mm) long and 8 in (200 mm) wide. Their actual dimensions are 3/8 inch (9.5 mm) less than the nominal dimensions (to allow for 3/8-inch mortar joints between blocks in any orientation). In Ireland and the UK, blocks are usually 440 mm × 215 mm × 100 mm (17 5/16 in × 8 15/32 in × 3 15/16 in) excluding mortar joints. In Australia, New Zealand and Canada, blocks are usually 390 mm × 190 mm × 190 mm (15 11/32 in × 7 15/32 in × 7 15/32 in) excluding mortar joints.

Block cores are typically tapered so that their top surface (as laid) has a greater surface on which to spread a mortar bed and for easier handling. Most concrete blocks have two cores, but three- and four-core units are also produced. A core also allows for the insertion of steel reinforcement to span courses in order to increase tensile strength. This is accomplished by grouting the voids of blocks containing rebar with concrete. Thus reinforced, concrete block walls are better able to resist lateral forces such as wind load and seismic forces. Cores may also be filled with expanded-polystyrene (EPS) block foam insulation, substantially increasing the R-value of the resulting wall to be in compliance with the US national energy code.

A variety of specialized shapes exist to allow special construction features. U-shaped blocks, or knockout blocks, have notches to allow the construction of bond beams or lintel assemblies, using horizontal reinforcing grouted into place in the cavity. Blocks with a channel on the end, known as "jamb blocks", allow doors to be secured to wall assemblies. Blocks with grooved ends permit the construction of control joints, allowing a filler material to be anchored between the un-mortared block ends. Other features, such as radiused corners known as "bullnoses", may be incorporated. A wide variety of decorative profiles also exist.

Concrete blocks may be formulated with special aggregates to produce specific colors or textures for finish use. Special textures may be produced by splitting a ribbed or solid two-block unit; such factory-produced units are called "split-rib" or "split-face" blocks. Blocks may be scored by grooves the width of a mortar joint to simulate different block modules. For example, an 8-by-16-inch (200 mm × 410 mm) block may be scored in the middle to simulate 8-by-8-inch (200 mm × 200 mm) masonry, with the grooves filled with mortar and struck to match the true joints.

== Uses ==
Concrete blocks, when built with integral steel reinforcement, are a very common building material for the load-bearing walls of buildings, in what is termed concrete block structure (CBS) construction. One of the common foundation types for American suburban houses is the "crawl space foundation" which consists of a concrete block wall on the perimeter on which dimensional lumber floor joists are supported. Retaining walls, which can also be constructed of concrete blocks, can be constructed, either using blocks designed to be set back each course and used with a sand base and without mortar or reinforcing (gravity wall), or using blocks (typically an architectural style of block or clad with a veneer such as brick) with a concrete base, steel reinforcing and mortar (piling wall). Other very common, non-structural uses for concrete block walls (especially in American schools) are as interior fire-rated and extremely durable partition walls, and as exterior backup curtain walls for attachment of building envelope systems (rigid foam insulation and an air/vapor barrier) and veneers (stucco, steel, brick, or split-face concrete block).

== Properties ==
Concrete masonry walls may be ungrouted, partially grouted, or fully grouted, the latter two enhancing their structural strength. Additionally, steel reinforcement bars (rebar) can be used both vertically and horizontally inside a concrete block wall to maximize its structural performance. The cells in which the rebar is placed must be grouted for the bars to bond to the wall. For this reason, high-seismic zones typically allow only fully grouted walls in their building codes. The American design code that guides design engineers in using concrete blocks as a structural system is the Masonry Standards Joint Committee's Building Code Requirements & Specification for Masonry Structures (TMS 402/602-22).

The compressive strength of concrete blocks and masonry walls varies from approximately 3.4 to 34.5 MPa (500–5,000 psi) based on the type of concrete used to manufacture the unit, stacking orientation, the type of mortar used to build the wall, and whether it is a load-bearing partition or not, among other factors.

== See also ==
- Gypsum block
- Rusticated concrete block
- Fly ash brick

== Sources ==
- Beall, Christine (1987). Masonry Design and Detailing for Architects, Engineers and Builders (2nd ed.). New York: McGraw-Hill. ISBN 0-07-004223-3.
