= GigaCrete =

Line of concrete construction products

GigaCrete refers to a family of green building products based on proprietary non-silica, non-toxic, non-combustible, cementitious, mineral-based binders combined with filler material. GigaCrete building materials do not contain silica-based sands or Portland cement. GigaCrete products are manufactured by a privately held company, GigaCrete, Inc., whose factory headquarters are located in Las Vegas, Nevada.

== History ==
GigaCrete was invented in the early 2000s by British-born architect and industrial designer Andrew C. Dennis.

== Green Building Products ==
=== PlasterMax ===
GigaCrete PlasterMax, an LEED-qualified interior wall coating, is listed as a green building material and interior finish by Architectural Record.

GigaCrete PlasterMax is a fire-resistance rated interior wall coating for insulating concrete forms (ICF), thereby providing a fire-rated green alternative to gypsum drywall over ICF. When applied over an expanded polystyrene (EPS) foam facade of stacked ICF blocks, PlasterMax bonds to the foam and forms a surface that resists abrasion and abuse. PlasterMax can be applied over drywall.

=== StuccoMax ===
GigaCrete StuccoMax is an exterior water-resistant green stucco product, an inorganic mixture of mineral binders and limestone sand. Like PlasterMax, StuccoMax bonds with expanded polystyrene (EPS) and forms a surface resistant to abrasion and abuse.

=== BallistiCrete ===
GigaCrete BallistiCrete is a green protective interior plaster passed as NIJ Level III and NIJ Level IV Armor Piercing in tests conducted by Intertek's H.P. White Laboratory, an accredited ballistics and ballistics resistance laboratory.

==== Controversy in Rio de Janeiro ====
In April 2017, Marcelo Crivella, mayor of Rio de Janeiro, announced a plan to fortify 400 schools with BallistiCrete. The schools are located in areas of the city allegedly dominated by drug traffickers. Critics of Crivella's plan argued that school buildings, made resistant to incoming gunfire by the application of BallistiCrete, could be seized by bandits and used as armored fortresses in wars between gangs or clashes with police.

=== GigaHouse ===
GigaHouse refers to GigaCrete's steel-framed, insulated-panel building system designed to be finished using GigaCrete exterior and interior plasters. External claddings can be added to a GigaHouse.

On October 15, 2020, Bloomberg News reported: "A Nevada company called GigaCrete manufactures panels made with expanded polystyrene insulation foam that slot into steel frames to form walls. Once assembled at a building site, the exterior and interior surfaces are coated with a proprietary non-combustible material that resists temperatures up to 1,700°F (927°C). GigaCrete structures have also been rated to withstand wind speeds of 245 miles per hour (394 kilometers per hour)."

==== Miami-Dade County Notice of Acceptance (NOA) ====
On May 30, 2019, the Miami-Dade County Product Control Section issued a Notice of Acceptance (NOA #19-0326.04) in respect to the GigaCrete Exterior Wall Panel System and Large and Small Missile Impact Resistance, thereby designating said system as complying with the High Velocity Hurricane Zone (HVHZ) of the Florida Building Code.

On December 10, 2020, the Miami-Dade County Product Control Section issued a superseding Notice of Acceptance (NOA #20-0922.04) in respect to the GigaCrete Exterior Wall Panel System and Large and Small Missile Impact Resistance, thereby designating said system as complying with the High Velocity Hurricane Zone (HVHZ) of the Florida Building Code.

==== FAA ====
In February 2015, the U.S. Federal Aviation Administration (FAA) issued a solicitation for "Design & Construction of 5 Duplexes at Kaibab National Forest, Tusayan Ranger Station, Tusayan, Arizona." In section 02.Scope of Work, the solicitation states, "The housing design/construction shall be GigaHouse by Giga Crete or equal.", and further states, "Each stem wall must use the GigaCrete mortar-less joint CMU system; or equal."

On August 4, 2015, pursuant to said solicitation, the FAA awarded the contract to Koo Design-Build, Inc. of Scottsdale, Arizona in the amount of US$1,085,100.00.

==== East Bay Revitalization ====
East Bay Revitalization, Inc., a California nonprofit organization, sponsored the construction of a 300-square-foot (28 m^{2}) energy-efficient Accessory Dwelling Unit (ADU) a.k.a.Tiny house in Richmond, California. The unit was completed in September 2016 and built using GigaCrete's GigaHouse system and materials technology. In February 2017, sponsor EBR announced commencement of construction of a 1,500-square-foot (140 m^{2}) GigaHouse adjacent to the Richmond ADU.

==== Habitat for Humanity of Sonoma County (Sonoma Wildfire Cottage Initiative) ====
Habitat for Humanity of Sonoma County, California, is one of 1,400 affiliates of Habitat for Humanity International.

On June 6, 2018, Habitat for Humanity of Sonoma County announced a Sonoma Wildfire Cottage Initiative, a pilot project of temporary cottages showcasing a variety of innovative construction technologies for the purpose of evaluation. Three firms were selected to participate in the test, viz., Connect Homes, West Coast SIPs, and Giga Crete/Presidio Realty Advisors.

As reported on June 13, 2018, in Builder magazine, the then-interim CEO of Habitat for Humanity of Sonoma County, Mr. John Kennedy, chairman of the board, stated, “The devastating October (2017) wildfires destroyed over 5,200 homes in Sonoma County, which made our housing crisis dramatically worse. This pilot project helps us quickly evaluate a variety of technologies while simultaneously helping families in dire need of stable temporary housing."

Construction for the pilot program commenced October 12, 2018, on the Medtronic Fountaingrove campus in Santa Rosa, California.

On August 16, 2019, the North Bay Business Journal reported, "The first five 'wildfire cottages' built for survivors of the October 2017 blazes that destroyed thousands of Santa Rosa homes were dedicated Friday on land donated by Medtronic during a ceremony honoring the many partners involved."

== Awards ==
=== Popular Mechanics ===
In 2007, Popular Mechanics magazine awarded a Best in Green Design to panels made with GigaCrete hydraulic cement and waste materials.

=== U.S. Department of Energy Builders Challenge ===
In 2009, Next Gen 09 LLC, in partnership with the U.S. Department of Energy Builders Challenge program, built a high-performance 5,200-square-foot (480 m^{2}) ICF demonstration home outside Las Vegas, Nevada. A score of 70 or less on the Energy Smart Home Scale qualifies for the Builders Challenge. The Pittsburgh Post-Gazette, citing GigaCrete PlasterMax as the interior wall finish of the NextGen home, wrote: "[PlasterMax is] a mineral-based hydraulic cement made with recycled waste materials such as fly ash. Sprayed over ordinary drywall and then troweled smooth, it's lighter than conventional concrete and also won't shrink or crack; it's also bullet and blast resistant."

=== ICF Builder Magazine ===
The 2016 ICF Builder Award Winner for Best in Class Small Residential is an ICF home erected in Corte Madera, California. GigaCrete interior and exterior plasters were applied directly over ICF wall surfaces.
