= Phil Kean Design Group =

American architecture and design company

- Company type: Private
- Industry: Architecture
- Founded: 2002
- Headquarters: 912 W Fairbanks Avenue, Winter Park, Florida 32789, United States
- Key people: Phil Kean (Founder & CEO)
- Website: www.philkeandesigns.com

Phil Kean Design Group is an American international architecture, interior design and residential construction company.

== Overview ==
The firm was founded by Phil Kean. He is a member of the American Institute of Building Design, American Institute of Architects, Florida Green Building Coalition, Greater Orlando Builders Association and the U.S. Green Building Council. He was also a past-President of Orlando's Master Custom Builder Council.

Phil Kean Design Group is also known for its custom smart homes. Its use of sustainable designs has earned the group various certifications like the Energy Star, USGBC LEED-H Platinum, Indoor airPlus, NAHB Green Emerald FGBC Platinum and more. It has partnered with Tesla on some smart homes.
