= Hurricane Andrew =

Category 5 Atlantic hurricane in 1992

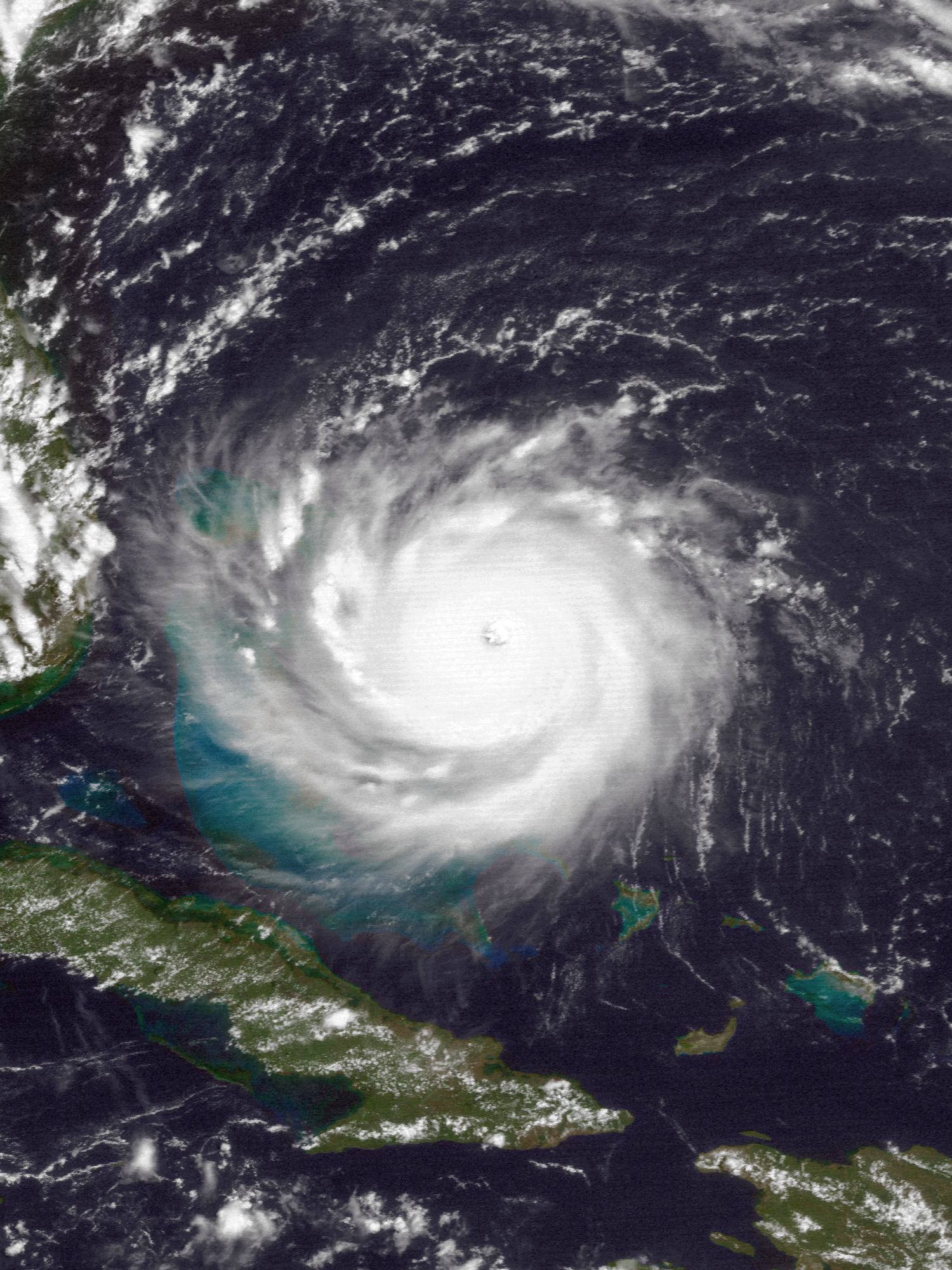
- Hurricane Andrew nearing the Bahamas at peak intensity on August 23

Meteorological history
- Formed: August 16, 1992
- Extratropical: August 28, 1992
- Dissipated: August 29, 1992

Category 5 major hurricane
- 1-minute sustained (SSHWS/NWS)
- Highest winds: 175 mph (280 km/h)
- Lowest pressure: 922 mbar (hPa); 27.23 inHg

Overall effects
- Fatalities: 65 total
- Damage: $27.3 billion (1992 USD) (Costliest tropical cyclone on record at the time)
- Areas affected: The Bahamas; Southeastern United States; Mid-Atlantic states
- IBTrACS
- Part of the 1992 Atlantic hurricane season

Hurricane Andrew was a compact but extremely powerful tropical cyclone that became the most destructive hurricane to ever hit Florida in terms of structures damaged or destroyed and remained the costliest in financial terms until Hurricane Irma surpassed it 25 years later. Andrew was also the strongest hurricane to make landfall in the United States in decades and the costliest hurricane to strike anywhere in the country, until it was surpassed by Hurricane Katrina in 2005. Andrew is one of only four tropical cyclones to make landfall in the continental United States as a Category 5, alongside the 1935 Labor Day hurricane, Hurricane Camille in 1969, and Michael in 2018. While the storm also caused major damage in The Bahamas and Louisiana, the greatest impact was felt in South Florida, where the storm made landfall as a Category 5 hurricane, with 1-minute sustained wind speeds as high as 165 mph (266 km/h) and gusts as high as 177 mph (285 km/h). Passing directly through the cities of Cutler Bay and Homestead in Dade County (now known as Miami-Dade County), the hurricane stripped many homes of all but their concrete foundations and caused catastrophic damage. In total, Andrew destroyed more than 63,500 houses, damaged more than 124,000 others, caused $27.3 billion in damage (equivalent to $65 billion in 2023), (Note: All damage figures are in 1992 USD, unless otherwise noted) and left 65 people dead.

Andrew began as a tropical depression over the eastern Atlantic Ocean on August 16. After spending a week without significantly strengthening itself in the central Atlantic, the storm rapidly intensified into a powerful Category 5 hurricane while moving westward towards The Bahamas on August 23. Though Andrew briefly weakened to Category 4 status while traversing The Bahamas, it regained Category 5 intensity before making landfall in Florida on Elliott Key and then Homestead on August 24. With a barometric pressure of 922 hPa (27.23 inHg) at the time of landfall in Florida, Andrew is the sixth most-intense hurricane to strike the United States. Several hours later, the hurricane emerged over the Gulf of Mexico at Category 4 strength, with the Gulf Coast of the United States in its dangerous path. After turning northwestward and weakening further, Andrew moved ashore near Morgan City, Louisiana, as a low-end Category 3 storm. The small hurricane curved northeastward after landfall and rapidly lost its intensity, becoming an extratropical cyclone on August 28, and merging with the remnants of Hurricane Lester and a frontal system over the southern Appalachian Mountains on August 29.

Andrew first inflicted structural damage as it moved through the Bahamas, especially in Cat Cays, lashing the islands with storm surge, hurricane-force winds, and tornadoes. About 800 houses were destroyed in the archipelago, and there was substantial damage to the transport, water, sanitation, agriculture, and fishing sectors. Andrew left four dead and $250 million in damage throughout The Bahamas. In parts of southern Florida, Andrew produced severe winds; a wind gust of 177 mph (285 km/h) was observed at a house in Perrine. The cities of Florida City, Homestead, Cutler Ridge, and parts of Kendall received the brunt of Andrew. As many as 1.4 million people lost power at the height of the storm, some for more than one month. In the Everglades, 70,000 acres (280 km^{2}) of trees were downed, while invasive Burmese pythons began inhabiting the region after a nearby facility housing them was destroyed. Though Andrew was moving fast, rainfall in Florida was substantial in a few areas (less in others); the rainfall peaked at 13.98 inches (355 mm) in western Dade County. Andrew was considered a "dry hurricane" by multiple media networks. In Florida, Andrew killed 44 and left a then-record $25 billion in damage.

Prior to making landfall in Louisiana on August 26, Andrew caused extensive damage to oil platforms in the Gulf of Mexico, leading to $500 million in losses for oil companies. It produced hurricane-force winds along its path through Louisiana, damaging large stretches of power lines that left about 230,000 people without electricity. Over 80% of trees in the Atchafalaya Basin were downed, and the agriculture there was devastated. Throughout the basin and Bayou Lafourche, 187 million freshwater fish were killed in the hurricane. With 23,000 houses damaged, 985 others destroyed, and 1,951 mobile homes demolished, property losses in Louisiana exceeded $1.5 billion. The hurricane caused the deaths of 17 people in the state, 6 of whom drowned offshore. Andrew spawned at least 28 tornadoes along the Gulf Coast, especially in Alabama, Georgia, and Mississippi. In total, Andrew left 65 dead and caused $27.3 billion in damage. Andrew is currently the ninth-costliest Atlantic hurricane to hit the United States. It is also the third-strongest hurricane to hit the U.S. mainland by wind speed (165 mph (266 km/h)). Due to the destruction and loss of life caused by the storm, the name Andrew was retired by the World Meteorological Organization in the spring of 1993, being replaced by Alex for 1998.

== Meteorological history ==
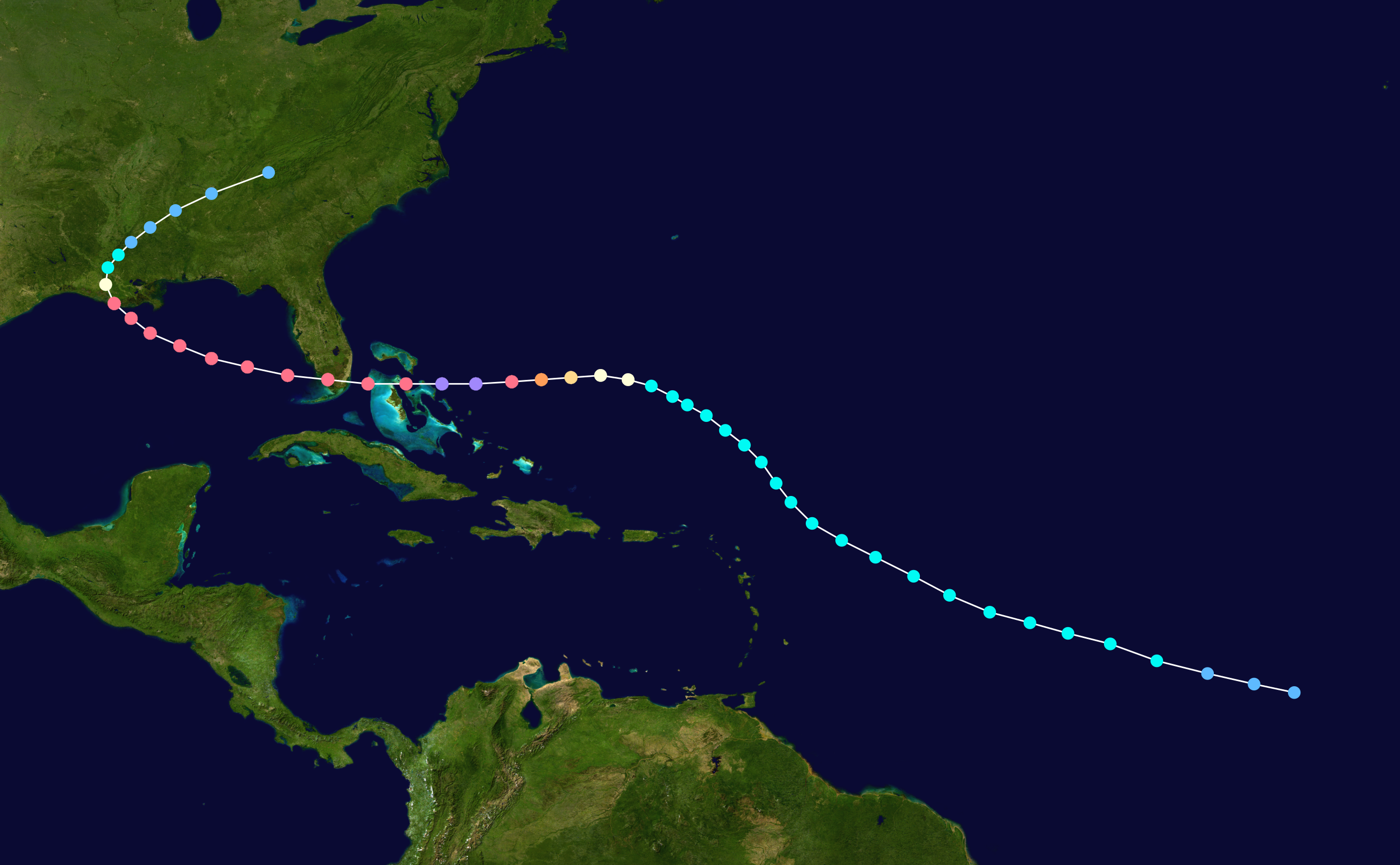
Map plotting the storm's track and intensity, according to the Saffir–Simpson scale Map key Saffir–Simpson scale Tropical depression (≤38 mph, ≤62 km/h) Tropical storm (39–73 mph, 63–118 km/h) Category 1 (74–95 mph, 119–153 km/h) Category 2 (96–110 mph, 154–177 km/h) Category 3 (111–129 mph, 178–208 km/h) Category 4 (130–156 mph, 209–251 km/h) Category 5 (≥157 mph, ≥252 km/h) Unknown Storm type Tropical cyclone Subtropical cyclone Extratropical cyclone, remnant low, tropical disturbance, or monsoon depression

On August 14, a tropical wave moved off the west coast of Africa. A ridge of high pressure to its north caused the wave to move quickly westward. An area of convection developed along the wave axis to the south of the Cape Verde islands, and on August 15, meteorologists began classifying the system using the Dvorak technique. The thunderstorm activity became more concentrated, and narrow spiral rainbands began to develop around a center of circulation. It is estimated that Tropical Depression Three developed late on August 16, about 1,630 mi (2,620 km) east-southeast of Barbados. Embedded within the deep easterlies, the depression tracked west-northwestward at 20 mph (32 km/h). Initially, moderate wind shear prevented strengthening, until a decrease in shear allowed the depression to intensify into a tropical storm, which the National Hurricane Center named Andrew at 12:00 UTC on August 17.

By the morning hours of August 18, the storm had maintained convection near its center, with spiral bands to its west, as the winds increased to 50 mph (80 km/h). Shortly thereafter, the storm began to lose velocity due to increased southwesterly wind shear from an upper-level low. On August 19, a hurricane hunters flight into the storm failed to locate a well-defined center and on the following day, a flight found that the cyclone had degenerated to the extent that only a diffuse low-level circulation center remained; observations indicated the barometric pressure rose to an unusually high 1,015 mbar (29.97 inHg). The flight indicated that Andrew maintained a vigorous circulation aloft. After the upper-level low weakened and split into a trough, the wind shear decreased over the storm. A strong high pressure system then developed over the southeastern United States, which built eastward and caused Andrew to turn to the west. Convection became more organized as upper-level outflow became better established. An eye formed, and Andrew attained hurricane status early on August 22, about 650 mi (1,050 km) east-southeast of Nassau, Bahamas. In the forecast issued six hours after becoming a hurricane, the cyclone was predicted to make landfall near Jupiter, Florida, with winds of 105 mph (169 km/h) on August 25. This underestimated both the strength and the speed of the storm, which would eventually make landfall in South Florida.

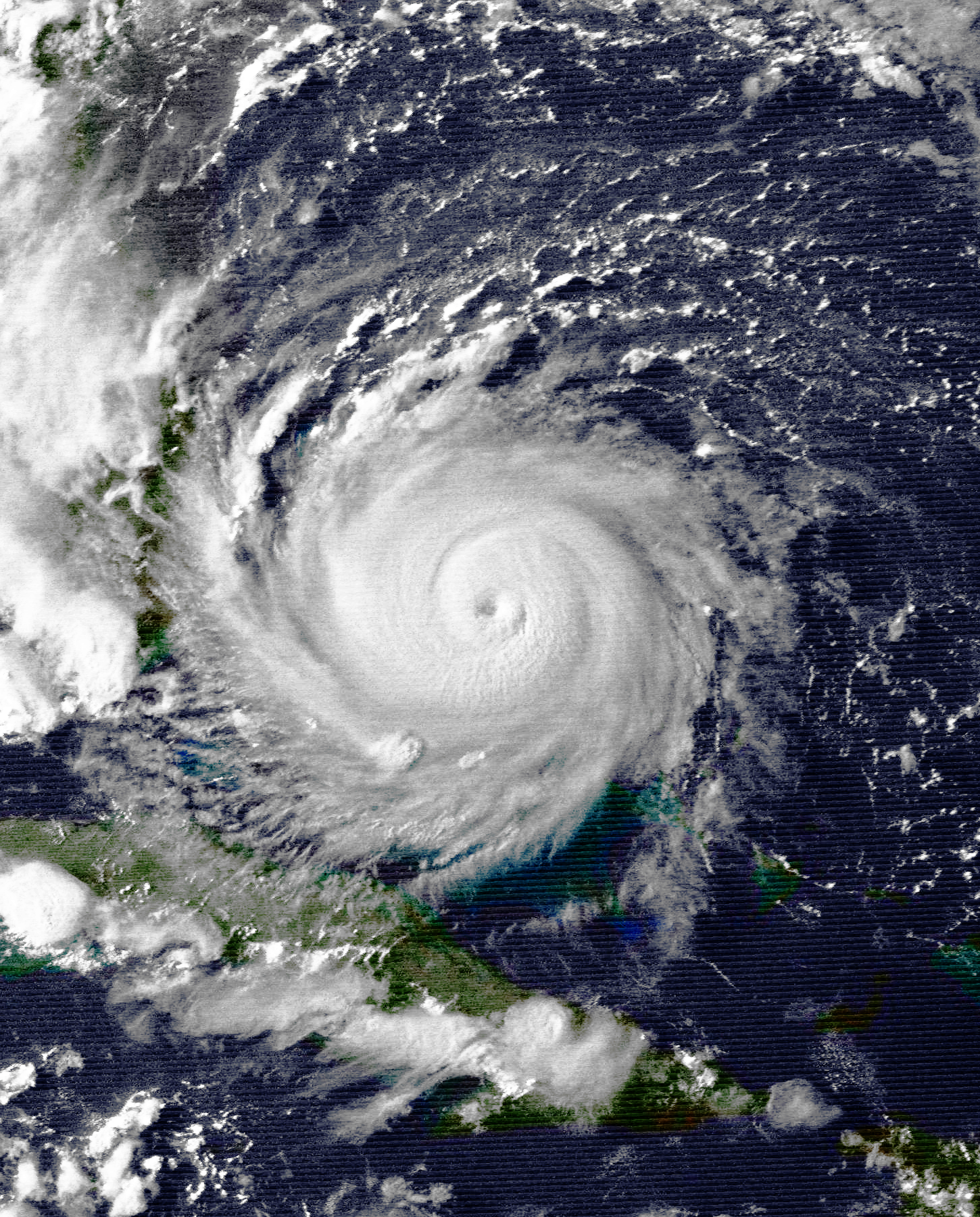
Hurricane Andrew making landfall in Eleuthera on August 23

Hurricane Andrew in the Gulf of Mexico on August 25

The hurricane accelerated westward into an area of highly favorable conditions, and began to rapidly intensify late on August 22; the atmospheric pressure dropped by 47 mbar (1.388 inHg) to a minimum of 922 mbar (27.23 inHg) in a 24‑hour period. On August 23, the storm attained Category 5 status on the Saffir–Simpson scale, reaching maximum sustained winds of 175 mph (282 km/h) a short distance off Eleuthera in the Bahamas at 18:00 UTC. (Note: All wind speeds in the article are maximum sustained winds sustained for one minute, unless otherwise noted.) Despite its intensity, Andrew was a small tropical cyclone, with winds of 35 mph (56 km/h) extending out only about 90 mi (140 km) from the center. After reaching that intensity, the hurricane underwent an eyewall replacement cycle. At 21:00 UTC on August 23, Andrew made landfall on Eleuthera as a Category 5 hurricane, with winds of 160 mph (260 km/h). The cyclone weakened further while crossing the Bahama Banks, and at 01:00 UTC on August 24, Andrew hit the southern Berry Islands of The Bahamas as a Category 4 hurricane, with winds of 150 mph (240 km/h). As it crossed over the warm waters of the Gulf Stream, the hurricane rapidly re-intensified as the eye decreased in size and its eyewall convection deepened. At 08:40 UTC on August 24, Andrew struck Elliott Key as a Category 5 hurricane, with winds of 165 mph (266 km/h) and a pressure of 926 mbar (27.34 inHg). About 25 minutes after its first Florida landfall, Andrew made another landfall just northeast of Homestead, with a slightly lower pressure of 922 mbar (27.23 inHg). This barometric pressure made Andrew the most intense hurricane to strike the United States since Hurricane Camille in 1969 and the strongest tropical cyclone to make landfall in Florida since the Labor Day hurricane of 1935. The United States would not experience another landfall from a hurricane at Category 5 intensity until Hurricane Michael in 2018. As the eye moved onshore in Florida, the convection in the eyewall strengthened due to increased convergence, and Hurricane Hunters reported a warmer eyewall temperature than two hours prior. However, Andrew weakened as it continued further inland, and after crossing southern Florida in four hours, the storm emerged into the Gulf of Mexico with winds of 130 mph (210 km/h). In the Gulf of Mexico, the eye remained well-defined as the hurricane turned to the west-northwest, a change due to the weakening of the ridge to its north. Andrew steadily re-intensified over the Gulf of Mexico, reaching winds of 145 mph (233 km/h) late on August 25. As the high pressure system to its north weakened, a strong mid-latitude trough approached the area from the northwest. This caused the hurricane to decelerate to the northwest, and winds decreased as Andrew approached the Gulf Coast of the United States.

Most intense landfalling tropical cyclones in the United States (measured by central pressure)
Rank	System	Season	Landfall pressure
1	"Labor Day"	1935	892 mbar (hPa)
2	Camille	1969	900 mbar (hPa)
2	Yutu	2018	900 mbar (hPa)
4	Bavi	2026	914 mbar (hPa)
5	Michael	2018	919 mbar (hPa)
6	Katrina	2005	920 mbar (hPa)
6	Maria	2017	920 mbar (hPa)
6	Sinlaku	2026	920 mbar (hPa)
9	Andrew	1992	922 mbar (hPa)
10	"Indianola"	1886	925 mbar (hPa)
Source: HURDAT, Hurricane Research Division, NWS Guam

At 08:30 UTC on August 26, the cyclone made landfall about 20 mi (32 km) west-southwest of Morgan City, Louisiana, with winds of 115 mph (185 km/h). Andrew weakened rapidly as it turned to the north and northeast, falling to tropical storm intensity within 10 hours. After entering Mississippi, the cyclone weakened into a tropical depression early on August 27. Accelerating northeastward, the depression began merging with the approaching frontal system, and by midday on August 28, Andrew had lost its tropical characteristics while located over the southern Appalachian Mountains. The storm's remnants continued moving northeast, fully merging with the remnants of Hurricane Lester and a frontal zone over Pennsylvania on August 29.

Post-analysis on Andrew revealed that the storm was often stronger than operationally reported between early on August 22 and early on August 26. In real time, the National Hurricane Center assessed its peak intensity as 150 mph (240 km/h), which was upgraded to 155 mph (249 km/h) in a post-storm analysis after the season ended. However, a 2004 paper by Christopher Landsea and others concluded that Andrew became a Category 5 hurricane near the Bahamas on August 23 and reached maximum sustained winds of 175 mph (282 km/h). The paper also indicated that Andrew briefly re-intensified into a Category 5 hurricane around the time of landfall in South Florida early on August 24. The storm was found to have been slightly stronger than originally assessed while approaching Louisiana, but the landfall winds were decreased from 120 to 115 mph (193 to 185 km/h).

== Preparations ==
=== Bahamas ===
At 1500 UTC on August 22, about 30 hours prior to landfall, the government of the Bahamas issued a hurricane watch for the northwest Bahamas, including Andros and Eleuthera islands, northward through Grand Bahama and Great Abaco. Six hours later, the watch was upgraded to a hurricane warning, and about 15 hours before landfall a hurricane warning was issued for the central Bahamas, including Cat Island, Exuma, San Salvador Island, and Long Island. All watches and warnings were discontinued on August 24. The advance warning was credited for the low death toll in the country. A total of 58 shelters were opened at churches, government buildings, and schools.

Prime Minister of the Bahamas Hubert Ingraham, who took office while the storm was active, urged residents to "take this hurricane seriously". Before the hurricane passed through the Bahamas, forecasters predicted a storm surge of up to 18 ft (5.5 m), as well as up to 8 in (200 mm) of rain.

In a subsequent analysis by Arthur Rolle, the Bahamas Chief Meteorological Officer, national emergency agencies including the Red Cross and the Royal Bahamas Defence Force "responded exceptionally well to the hurricane alerts." The same report cited the public "[exhibiting] a degree of complacency, particularly in New Providence and The Current, Eleuthera." Ultimately, the advance warning of the hurricane contributed to the low death toll from the storm. The hurricane struck four days after Hubert Ingraham became Bahamian Prime Minister, the first new Prime Minister in 25 years. There was initially a concern over how Ingraham would handle the hurricane, due to many of the government officials remaining in power from the previous administration; however, government response to the hurricane was normal.

=== Florida ===
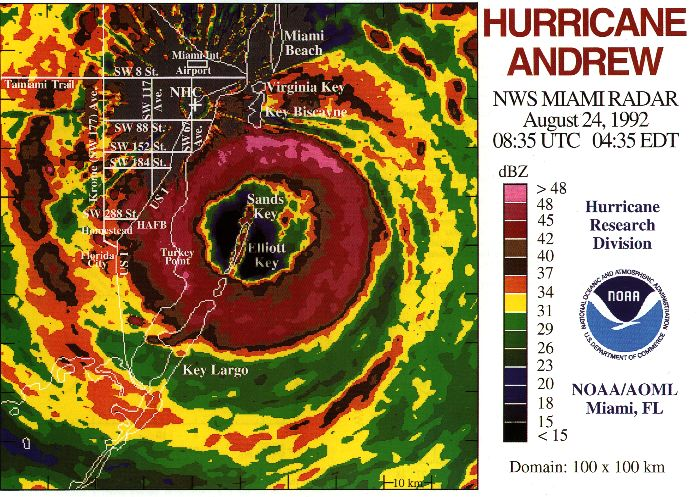
The last image from NWS Miami's WSR-57 at the National Hurricane Center, taken just moments before the radar was blown off its mounts by Andrew.

Initially, forecasters predicted tides up to 14 ft (4.3 m) above normal along the east coast of Florida, near the potential location of landfall. Rainfall was projected to be between 5 and 8 in (130 and 200 mm) along the path of the storm. In addition, the National Hurricane Center noted the likelihood of isolated tornadoes in Central and South Florida during the passage of Andrew on August 23 and 24. Several tropical storm and hurricane warnings were issued for much of Central and South Florida, from Titusville on the east coast to Venice on the west coast. Included in the warnings were Lake Okeechobee and all of the Florida Keys. By 18:00 UTC on August 24, all watches and warnings issued were discontinued after Andrew progressed into the Gulf of Mexico.

Governor Lawton Chiles declared a state of emergency and activated about one-third of the Florida National Guard. Many residents evacuated, most voluntarily, from Broward, Charlotte, Collier, Lee, Martin, Dade, Monroe, Palm Beach, and Sarasota counties. A total of 142 shelters opened in these counties and collectively housed at least 84,340 people. In Dade County alone, 515,670 people were ordered to evacuate. As Andrew was approaching, an estimated 20,000–30,000 tourists were in the Florida Keys (Monroe County). Overall, almost 1.2 million people evacuated, which contributed to the low number of fatalities, despite the intensity of the storm. Many evacuees also checked into hotels, with rooms completely booked as far north as Ocala. Ultimately, the sheer number of evacuees led to likely the largest traffic jam in the history of Florida, mostly along Interstate 95. United States Coast Guard vessels on or near the Florida coastline were either secured onshore or sent to ride out the storm at sea. Government offices and public and private schools were closed from Monroe County northward to St. Lucie County. Many colleges and universities in southeast Florida also closed. Major airports such as the Fort Lauderdale–Hollywood, Key West, Miami, and Palm Beach international airports closed.

=== Gulf Coast of the United States ===
Shortly after the storm emerged into the Gulf of Mexico from southern Florida, the National Hurricane Center issued hurricane watches and warnings for the Gulf Coast of the United States beginning at 13:00 UTC on August 24. After the initial hurricane watch from Mobile, Alabama, to Sabine Pass, Texas, the watches and warnings were expanded to eventually include areas from Mobile, Alabama, to Freeport, Texas. All watches and warnings on the Gulf Coast were discontinued late on August 26 after the hurricane moved inland over Louisiana.

Due to the hurricane's threat, workers fled oil platforms in the Gulf of Mexico, while the Coast Guard moved their boats inland. Officials in Mississippi suggested that about 100,000 people evacuate the coastal counties. Shelters were opened in Hancock and Harrison counties, though only 68 people went to a shelter in the former. Gambling ships were moved into harbors and inland canals. Two run-offs for special legislative elections scheduled for August 25 were postponed.

In Louisiana, Governor Edwin Edwards declared a state of emergency. About 1.25 million people evacuated from the central and southeast Louisiana, while approximately 60,000 others fled parishes in southwest Louisiana. A mandatory evacuation from Grand Isle was ordered by Mayor Andy Valence and the city council. In New Orleans, Mayor Sidney Barthelemy ordered the evacuation of about 200,000 residents in the low-lying areas of the city. Nine shelters were opened in the city, which were occupied by thousands of people. In response to computer simulations showing that storm surge from a tropical cyclone like Hurricane Andrew could over-top the levees, workers closed 111 floodgates. The New Orleans International Airport closed, with jumbo jets being flown to other airports. A total of 250 members of the Louisiana National Guard patrolled the streets during the storm. The Red Cross assisted with opening a shelter at the University of Southwest Louisiana's Cajundome in Lafayette, equipped to handle about 2,000 people.

In Texas, about 250,000 people evacuated Orange and Jefferson counties. Galveston City Manager Doug Matthews advised residents to develop an evacuation plan in case the city chose to call for evacuations. The city later decided against ordering an evacuation. School was canceled on August 25 for Beaumont, Port Arthur, and other areas of central Jefferson County, while schools were closed in Dickinson, High Island, Hitchcock, La Marque, Santa Fe, and Texas City on August 26. College of the Mainland, Galveston College, and Texas A&M University at Galveston were also closed. Emergency management crews in Corpus Christi began testing emergency generators and severe weather gear. The Comal County chapter of the Red Cross placed their disaster alert teams on standby and ready to respond if the hurricane threatened the Corpus Christi area.

== Impact ==
Costliest U.S. Atlantic hurricanes, 1900–2017 Direct economic losses, normalized to societal conditions in 2018
Rank	Hurricane	Season	Cost
1	4 "Miami"	1926	$235.9 billion
2	4 "Galveston"	1900	$138.6 billion
3	3 Katrina	2005	$116.9 billion
4	4 "Galveston"	1915	$109.8 billion
5	5 Andrew	1992	$106.0 billion
6	ET Sandy	2012	$73.5 billion
7	3 "Cuba–Florida"	1944	$73.5 billion
8	4 Harvey	2017	$62.2 billion
9	3 "New England"	1938	$57.8 billion
10	4 "Okeechobee"	1928	$54.4 billion
Main article: List of costliest Atlantic hurricanes

Even though Andrew was a small tropical cyclone for most of its lifespan, it caused extreme damage, especially in the Bahamas, Florida, and Louisiana. The vast majority of the damage was as a result of extremely high winds, although a few tornadoes spawned by Andrew caused considerable damage in Louisiana. Throughout the areas affected, almost 177,000 people were left homeless. Outside of The Bahamas, Florida, and Louisiana, effects were widespread, although damage was minimal. Overall, $27.3 billion in losses and 65 fatalities were attributed to Andrew, although many other estimates range as high as $36 billion. Andrew was, at the time, the costliest hurricane in U.S. history.

=== Bahamas ===
Hurricane Andrew brought maximum sustained winds of over 119 km/h (74 mph) to five districts – North Eleuthera, New Providence, North Andros, Bimini, Berry Islands – as well as three cays. The storm first struck North Eleuthera, The hurricane also produced tropical storm force winds in seven districts, including Cat Island, South Abaco, Central Andros, the northern island chain in Exuma, and the three districts on Grand Bahama. At the capital city of Nassau, sustained winds reached 92 mph (148 km/h), while gusts up to 115 mph (185 km/h) were reported. Harbour Island, near Eleuthera, reported wind gusts of 138 mph (222 km/h) – the strongest gust speed observed in the Bahamas during Andrew's passage. Much of the northwestern Bahamas received damage, with monetary damage throughout the country totaling about $250 million (1992 USD, $384 million 2008 USD). The severe damage primarily occurred on sparsely populated islands, and in contrast the more populated areas largely received rainfall and gusty winds. The hurricane affected about 2% of the places available for rent in the country, resulting in a drop in tourism. A total of 800 houses were destroyed, leaving 1,700 people homeless. Additionally, five schools were destroyed, and overall the storm left severe damage to the sectors of transport, communications, water, sanitation, agriculture, and fishing. The hurricane caused four deaths in the country, of which three directly; the indirect fatality was due to a heart failure during the passage of the storm.

Hurricane Andrew first made landfall on August 23 as a Category 5 hurricane on the Saffir-Simpson scale, with winds of 260 km/h (160 mph). The hurricane struck the island of Eleuthera, which has a population of around 8,000, and is generally about 1.6 km (0.99 mi) in width. Prior to its arrival, the hurricane caused the coastline to recede about 3 mi (4.8 km), which was followed by what was described as a "mighty wall of water", or a storm surge. The Current, a small village in the northwestern portion of the island, recorded a surge of 7.2 m (24 ft). There, more than half of the houses in the village were destroyed, and the rest of the buildings sustained minor to major damage. On nearby Current Island, the hurricane destroyed 24 of the 30 houses in the village. The island's only road was heavily damaged, with parts still flooded more than a week after the storm.

The hurricane was estimated to have spawned several tornadoes in Eleuthera district, based on a subsequent analysis of damage to buildings and shrubbery; tornadoes were also reported in the nearby districts of Harbour Island and Spanish Wells. Towns south of where Andrew moved ashore received fairly minor damage, although the control tower at Governor's Harbour Airport was destroyed. High surf caused damage to roads and docks along the coast. In Spanish Wells, located near the north coast of Eleuthera, three buildings were destroyed, and a bridge connecting to a neighboring island was wrecked. All of Harbour Island, located northeast of Eleuthera, sustained damage, with several small houses destroyed. Overall, news reports indicated severe damage to 36 houses on the island. One person drowned from the storm surge in Eleuthera, and two others died in nearby The Bluff.

On New Providence, the hurricane destroyed one house, but caused no major damage in the capital city of Nassau. The Lynden Pindling International Airport near Nassau recorded 61 mm (2.4 in) of precipitation during the passage of Andrew. Further west, damage on Andros Island was fairly minor and limited to the northernmost portion of the island. One dock was destroyed, and two parks were severely damaged. On South Bimini, the storm caused light damage, including to two hotels on the island. The private island of Cat Cay in the Bimini Islands was severely impacted by the hurricane, with damage estimated at $100 million (1992 USD). Many wealthy homes and the island's marina received heavy damage, with hundreds of trees downed by the strong winds. Later, Hurricane Andrew made its second landfall in the Berry Islands early on August 24 as a Category 4 hurricane on the Saffir-Simpson scale. Damage was heavy and estimated "in the millions of dollars".

=== Florida ===
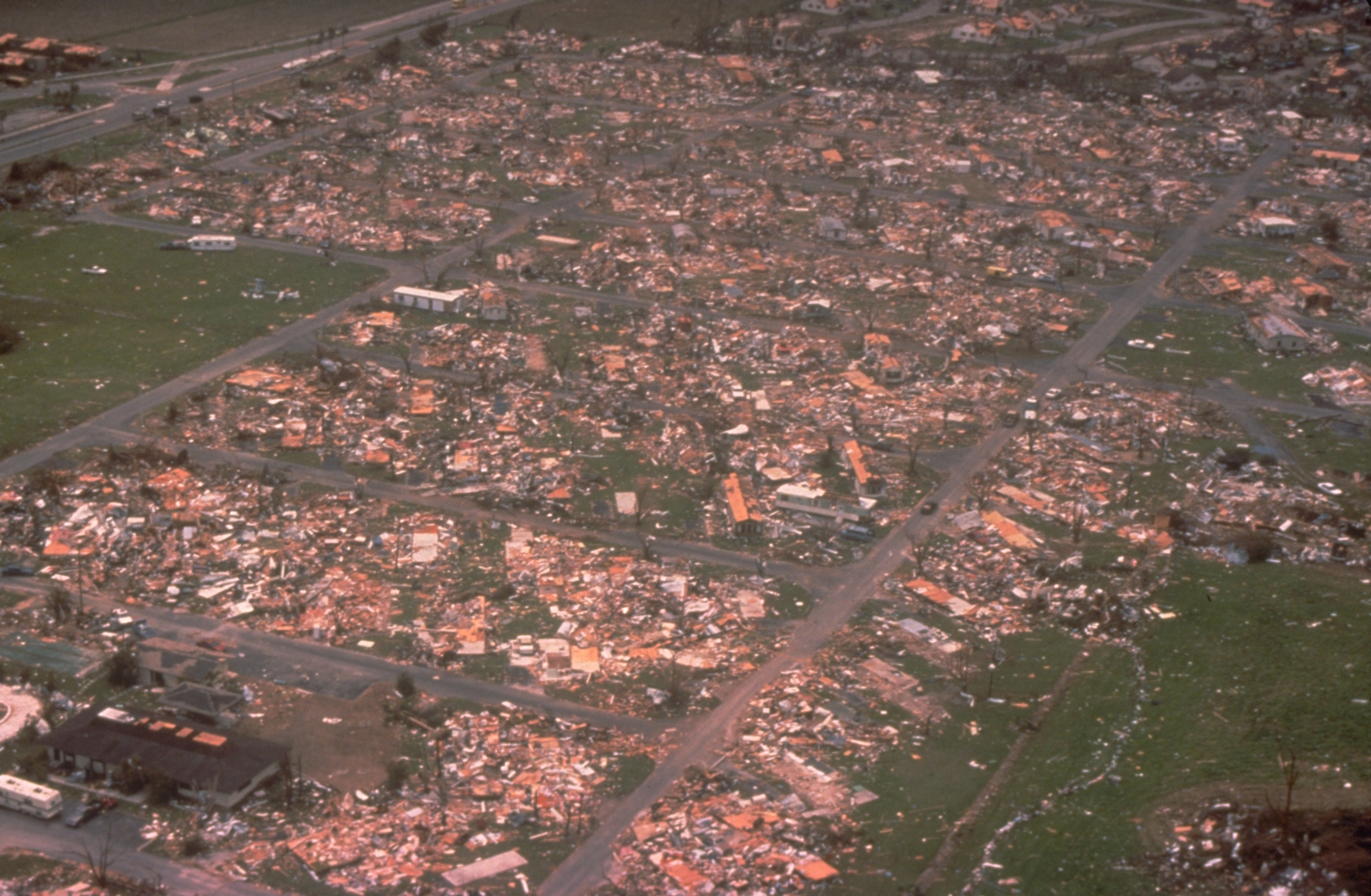
Damage from Hurricane Andrew in a large mobile home community

Overall, Andrew caused about $25.3 billion in damage in Florida, making it the costliest hurricane to hit the state at the time. Some estimates in Florida put the damage as high as $34 billion (1992 USD, $78 billion 2026 USD). Almost all of the damage in Florida was caused by strong winds, rather than storm surge or flooding that is usually associated with a major hurricane. Of the 44 deaths attributed to the storm, 15 were direct fatalities, while 29 were indirectly caused by the storm. It was later noted that if Andrew had been slightly larger or made landfall a few miles further north, it would have significantly affected Miami and Fort Lauderdale, which would have resulted in an even higher damage and death toll. An analysis by the American Meteorological Society indicated that unlike most hurricanes, wind damage from Andrew was mostly north of the geometric center and occurred primarily on the eastern edge of the storm. Some officials in Florida considered Andrew the worst storm in the state since the 1935 Labor Day hurricane. But most others, particularly the media and former National Hurricane Center director Max Mayfield, in retrospect stated that Andrew was hardly "The Big One", though still very devastating.

The storm surge from Andrew was very limited in its overall coverage due to the compactness of the hurricane, although it caused between $96 million and more than $500 million in losses to boats and buildings, based on various sources. At the height of the storm, more than 1.4 million people lost electricity and another 150,000 were without telephone service. It is estimated that throughout Florida, the storm damaged 101,241 homes and destroyed approximately 63,000 others – the vast majority in Dade County – with about 175,000 people rendered homeless. Smaller tropical cyclones like Andrew or Charley tend to produce less overall coverages and damage from the storm surge, in contrast to hurricanes such as Hugo, Ike, Ivan, and Katrina. In addition to homes, the storm damaged or destroyed 82,000 businesses, 32,900 acres (13,300 ha) of farmland, 31 public schools, 59 health facilities/hospitals, 9,500 traffic signals, 3,300 mi (5,300 km) of power lines, and 3,000 watermains. Approximately 20 million cubic yards (15 million m^{3}) of debris left by the storm were disposed of.

Tides were generally between 4 and 6 ft (1.2 and 1.8 m) above normal in the Biscayne Bay area, though near the Burger King International Headquarters, tides reached as high as 16.9 ft (5.2 m) above normal. Storm surge on the west coast was widespread but generally light, with a peak height of 6 ft (1.8 m) in Everglades City and Goodland. Strong winds from the storm were confined to a relatively small area, stretching from Key Largo to the Miami Beach area. A house near Perrine initially reported a wind gust of 212 mph (341 km/h) before the structure and instrument were destroyed; this measurement was reduced to 177 mph (285 km/h), after wind-tunnel testing at the Virginia Polytechnic Institute and State University of the same type of anemometer revealed a 16.5% error. Several other anemometers measuring the highest wind speeds on land were destroyed or failed. At the National Hurricane Center building in Coral Gables, sustained winds of 115 mph (185 km/h) and gusts to 164 mph (264 km/h) were measured before the anemometer failed. The highest sustained wind speed for the storm was 146 mph (235 km/h), recorded at the Turkey Point Nuclear Generating Station, before instruments also failed there. In Key Largo, a 13-minute wind speed of 114 mph (183 km/h) was reported. Tropical storm force winds reached as far north as West Palm Beach. On the west coast of Florida, sustained winds remained just below tropical storm force on Marco Island, though a wind gust of 100 mph (160 km/h) was reported in Collier County. Rainfall was generally light, possibly as a result of the storm's relatively fast movement. Overall, precipitation from Andrew peaked at nearly 14 in (360 mm) in western Dade County. Heavy rainfall in other areas was sporadic, with precipitation reported as far north as Central Florida.

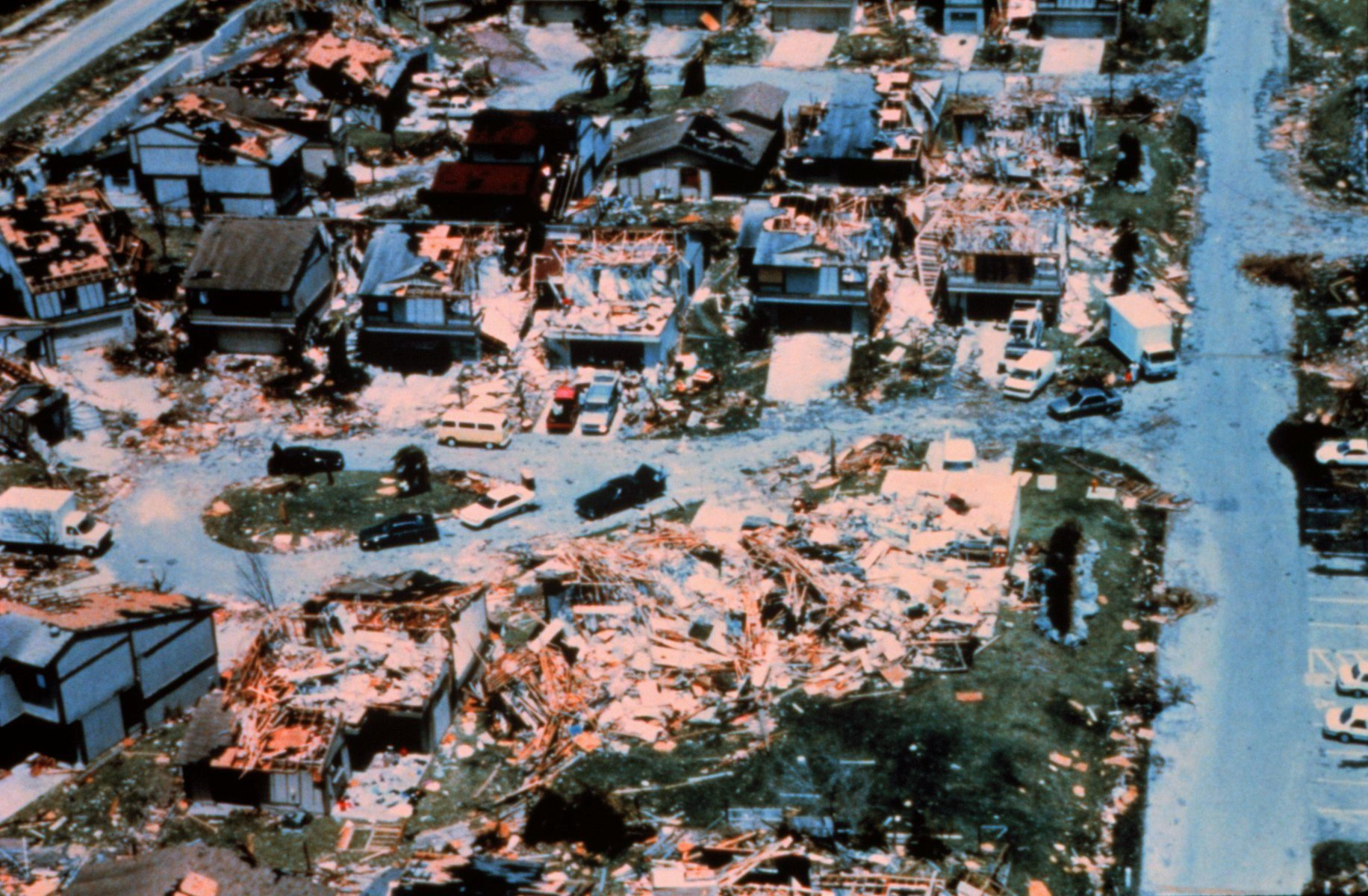
Damage in Lakes by the Bay

Although effects from Andrew were catastrophic, the extent of damage was limited mainly from Kendall to Key Largo due to the small wind field of the storm. The hurricane destroyed 90% of mobile homes in the county, including 99% of mobile homes in Homestead. At the Homestead Air Force Base, most of the 2,000 buildings on the base were severely damaged or rendered unusable. Damage to the base was extensive enough that it was recommended for closure. Nearby, in the small town of Florida City, over 120 homes were demolished and 700 others were damaged, while a number of other buildings were damaged beyond repair, including City Hall. Further north, damage to poorly constructed homes in communities such as Country Walk and Saga Bay resembled that of an F3 tornado. Winds in the area were estimated to have ranged from 130 to 150 mph (210 to 240 km/h), slightly below the threshold for an F3 tornado. Four of the five condominiums at Naranja Lakes were destroyed. The Cutler Ridge Mall suffered severe wind and water damage; after the storm, significant looting was reported at that location. More than 50 streets were blocked by fallen trees and power lines. Agriculture suffered extensively as well, with an 85% loss to fruit crops such as avocados, limes, and mangoes. Crop damage in Dade County totaled about $509 million. The county suffered the vast majority of the damage from the hurricane, totaling approximately $25 billion. Andrew left at least 40 deaths in the county, 15 direct and 25 indirect.

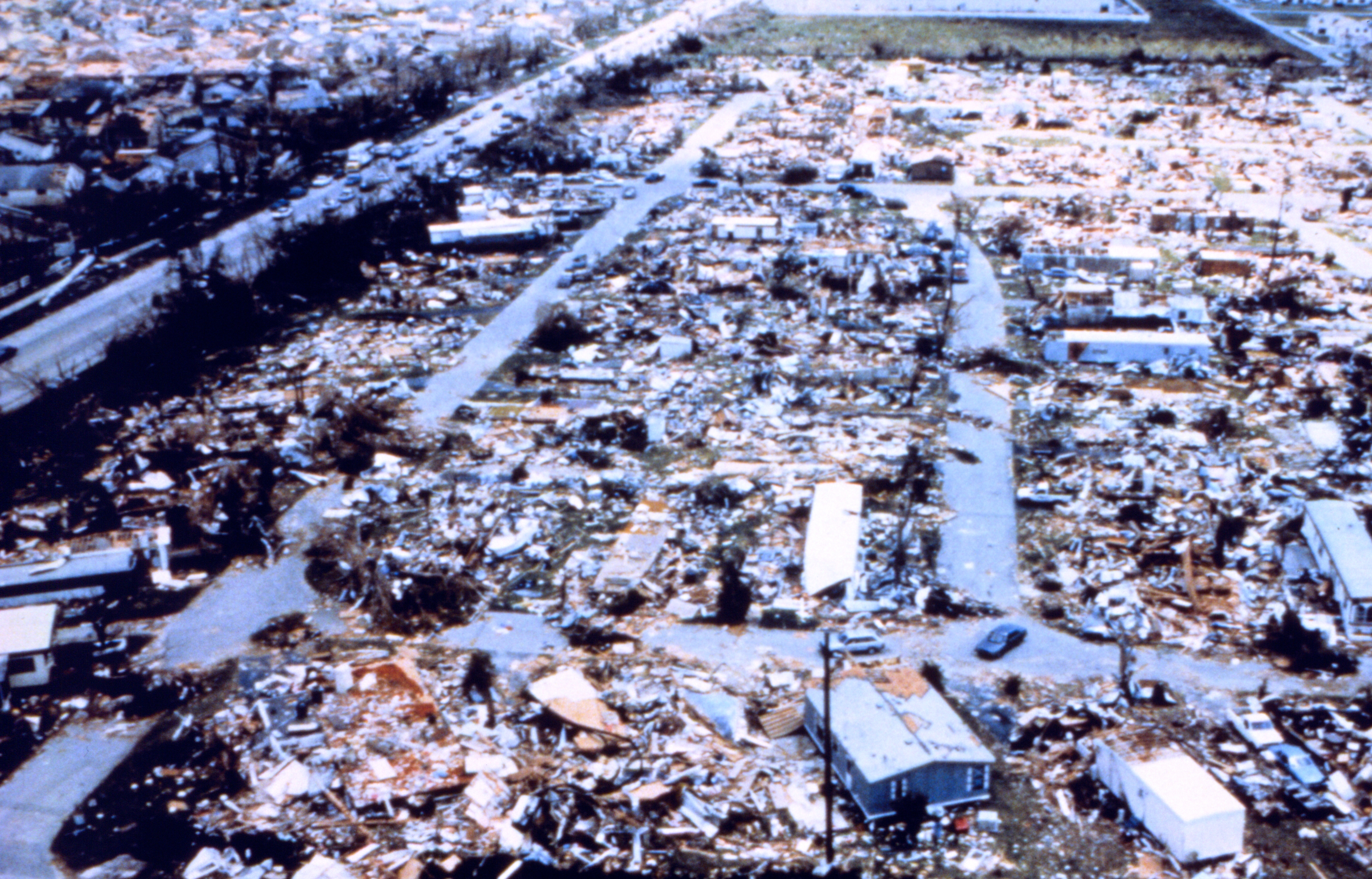
The Dadeland Mobile Home Park after Andrew

Elsewhere, effects were relatively minimal, except in Broward, Monroe, and Collier counties. In Broward County, on the north side of the storm's path, damage in several municipalities was primarily limited to downed trees, several of which fell onto roads and power lines. In Pembroke Park, one of the worst affected cities in the county, approximately 260 mobile homes were damaged. Storm surge left coastal flooding in some areas, especially along state roads A1A and 858. Property damage reached about $100 million and three fatalities were reported in Broward County. In Everglades National Park and Biscayne National Park, more than 25% of trees were damaged or destroyed, including one-fourth of the royal palms and one-third of the pine trees in the former. In addition to the damage at Everglades National Park, effects in Monroe County were significant, especially in the Upper Florida Keys. Strong winds damaged billboards, awnings, commercial signs, several boats, planes, trees, and 1,500 homes, with 300 of those becoming uninhabitable. Damage in that county was about $131 million. In Collier County, to the north of the storm's path, sustained winds up to 98 mph (158 km/h) were observed in Chokoloskee. Storm surge flooded low-lying areas, particularly in Goodland, Everglades City, and Marco Island. Many boats were damaged or destroyed by the rough seas and strong winds. The storm destroyed 80 mobile homes and severely damaged 400 others. Property damage in the county reached about $30 million.

=== Louisiana ===
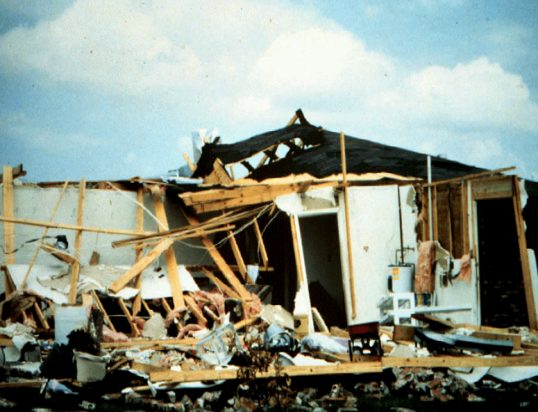
Damage from an F3 tornado spawned by Andrew in LaPlace

After hitting Florida, Andrew moved across the Gulf of Mexico and made landfall about 23 mi (37 km) west-southwest of Morgan City in south-central Louisiana; at landfall, the maximum sustained winds were 115 mph (185 km/h). The highest sustained wind speed observed was 96 mph (154 km/h), while a wind gust as strong as 120 mph (190 km/h) was recorded; both measurements were taken at the fire station in Berwick. As it moved ashore, the hurricane produced storm tides of at least 8 ft (2.4 m) above normal, causing flooding along the coast from Vermilion Bay to Lake Borgne. Offshore, a group of six fishermen from Alabama drowned. Heavy rains accompanied the storm's passage through the state, peaking at 11.02 in (280 mm) in Robert. River flooding was also reported, with the Tangipahoa River in Robert cresting at 3.8 ft (1.2 m) above flood stage. Before making landfall, Andrew spawned an F3 tornado in LaPlace, which killed two people and injured 32. The tornado was on the ground for about 10 minutes, during which it damaged or destroyed 163 structures, leaving 60 families homeless. Collectively, 14 tornadoes were reported in the parishes of Ascension, Iberville, Pointe Coupee, and Avoyelles, as well as in Baton Rouge.

Along the Louisiana coastline, damage largely resembled that of a Category 2 hurricane. Damage was heaviest in St. Mary Parish, about 32 mi (51 km) east of where Andrew made landfall. Twenty-six schools were affected, with damage totaling $2.6 million. Berwick High School, sheltering about 2,000 people, was deroofed during the storm. Generally, single-family homes fared well, with most losing only roofing shingles, though others suffered severe damage after large trees fell on them. In Cypremort Point State Park, several mobile homes were destroyed. Houses in Berwick, Morgan City, and Patterson suffered major damage. Throughout the parish, 1,367 dwellings were destroyed, 2,028 were severely damaged, and 4,770 others were impacted to a minor degree. Property damage alone in St. Mary Parish reached approximately $150 million. Iberia Parish was also among the most severely impacted parishes. Two schools collectively sheltering about 3,600 people in Jeanerette and New Iberia lost their roofs. One death occurred in the parish due to electrocution. A total of 407 residences were demolished, 2,528 others were extensively damaged, and 3,526 others were inflicted with minor damage. Overall, the parish suffered $125 million in property damage, while an additional $200 million in damage was inflicted on sugar crops.

Across the state, the hurricane damaged 23,000 homes and destroyed 985 homes and 1,951 mobile homes; private property damage was estimated at $1 billion. The high winds destroyed large areas of sugar and soybean crops, estimated at $289 million in damage. Strong winds also left at least 230,000 people without electricity. During the storm's passage, upwelling occurred in the Atchafalaya Basin and Bayou Lafourche, killing 187 million freshwater fish. Damage to the fishing industry was estimated at $266 million. Overall, losses in the state of Louisiana reached approximately $1.56 billion. A total of 17 deaths occurred in Louisiana, 8 directly and 9 from indirect causes. At least 75 injuries were reported.

=== Remainder of the United States ===
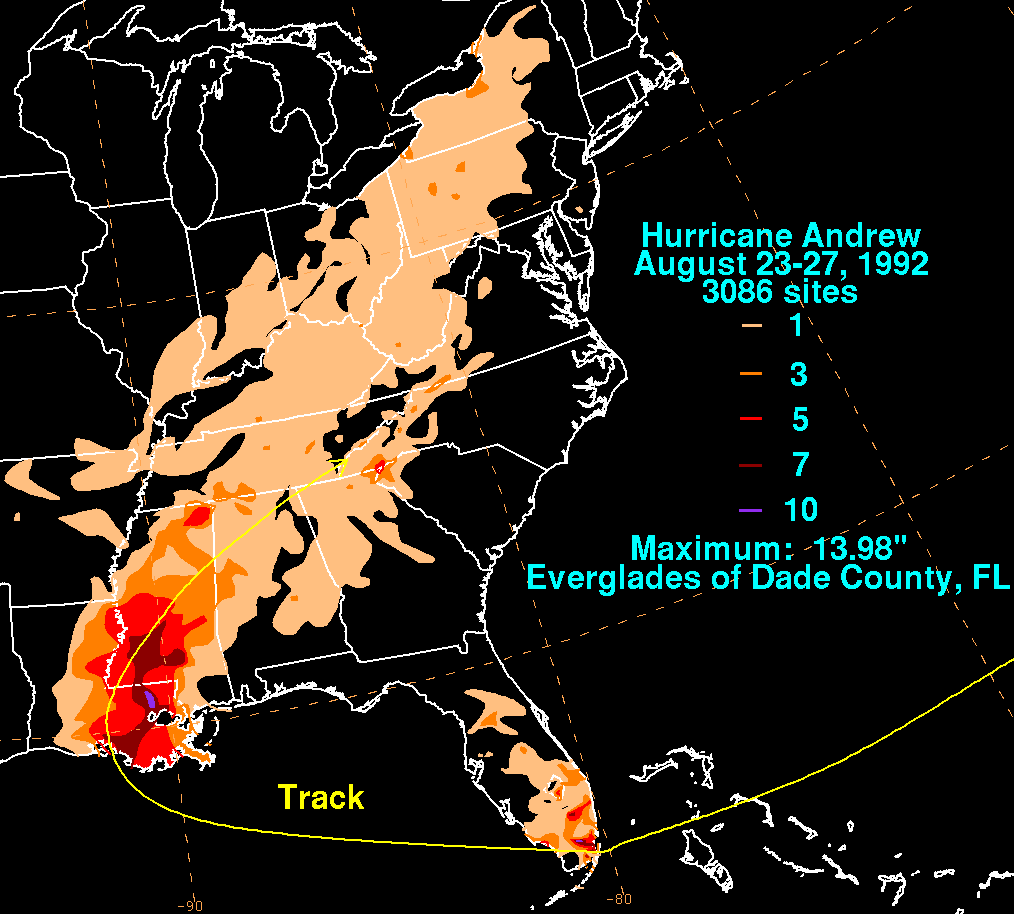
Rainfall summary of Hurricane Andrew in the United States

While Andrew was entering the Gulf of Mexico, oil companies evacuated hundreds of employees from offshore drilling platforms. The storm damaged 241 oil and gas facilities and toppled 33 platforms off the coast of Louisiana, causing significant disruptions in production. Additionally, 83 pipeline segments suffered damage to some degree. The oil industry lost about $12 million per day in the days following Andrew and $4 million daily by three weeks later. Initially, a production loss of 240,000 to 270,000 barrels per day occurred – approximately one-third of production throughout the Gulf of Mexico. Overall, Hurricane Andrew caused about $500 million in damage to oil facilities.

As Andrew moved ashore in Louisiana, its outer fringes produced a storm tide of about 1.3 ft (0.40 m) in Sabine Pass, Texas. Winds were generally light in the state, reaching 30 mph (48 km/h) in Port Arthur. As Andrew crossed into Mississippi, 3 severe thunderstorm warnings, 21 tornado warnings, and 16 flood warnings were issued. Funnel clouds were observed near the path of the storm, along with 26 tornadoes. Structural damage was generally minimal, occurring from the tornadoes and severe thunderstorms. One tornado in Kemper County destroyed a mobile home, while another twister in Lauderdale County demolished a mobile home, damaged five other dwellings, and injured four people. Additionally, a possible tornado damaged a home and two trailers in Lawrence County. Strong winds knocked down trees in the southwestern portion of the state. Much of Mississippi received 3 to 5 in (76 to 127 mm) of rain, while areas near the southwest corner of the state observed over 7 in (180 mm) of precipitation, with a peak of 9.30 in (236 mm) at Sumrall. Flooding was mostly limited to the inundation of minor roads and low-lying areas in several counties.

In Alabama, precipitation amounts in the state peaked at 4.71 in (120 mm) in Aliceville. The rainfall caused flooding in low-lying areas and creeks, covering a few county roads but not entering many houses or businesses. Along the coast, the storm produced flooding and high tides. Along Dauphin Island, high tides left severe beach erosion, with portions of the island losing up to 30 ft (9.1 m) of sand. Three damaging tornadoes occurred in the state. The most damaging tornado was spawned in Elmore County and moved from an area northeast of Montgomery to the south of Wetumpka and briefly lifted during its 0.5 mi (0.80 km) track. The tornado destroyed 2 homes and damaged 18 homes, 1 mobile home, 2 barns, and 1 vehicle. One person was injured by the twister. Sustained winds in the state were below tropical storm force, though a wind gust of 41 mph (66 km/h) was observed in Huntsville. Although 48 counties in Alabama reported wind damage, impact across the state was generally minor.

Tropical storm force wind gusts and damaging tornadoes extended eastward into Georgia. Several counties in the northwest and west-central portions of the state reported downed trees and tree limbs and fallen power lines, causing scattered power outages, but structural damage was generally minor. In Carroll County, several dwellings and barns were damaged, with one mobile home destroyed. At the Columbus Metropolitan Airport, buildings, billboards, and signs were damaged. Additionally, a tornado in Floyd County near Rome snapped and uprooted several trees, damaged several fences and homes, and flipped over a trailer, tossing it on top of four cars. Monetary losses in the state reached about $100,000. In Tennessee, thunderstorm winds and tornadoes associated with Andrew downed trees and power lines, but caused little overall impact to homes and buildings. Similarly, in North Carolina, thunderstorm winds toppled trees and power lines at a number of locations in the mountainous areas of the state, especially in Avery County. Rainfall from Andrew spread across the southeastern United States along the Appalachian Mountains corridor; totals of over 5 in (130 mm) were reported where Georgia and South Carolina meet North Carolina. In West Virginia, the remnants of Andrew combined with a cold front to produce 1.5 to 2.5 in (38 to 64 mm) of rain over portions of the state, causing flooding in areas of Morgantown with poor drainage. The remnants of Andrew also spawned several tornadoes in Maryland. A tornado in Howard County damaged several homes, some extensively. The twister also tossed and wrecked a recreational vehicle and its trailer, downed trees, and flattened cornfields. Precipitation continued along the path of Andrew's remnants through the Mid-Atlantic and Ohio Valley, with precipitation measured as far north as Upstate New York.

== Aftermath ==
=== Bahamas ===
Initially, the Bahamas National Disaster Coordinator believed that foreign aid was not required, but shortly after the storm, the Government of the United Kingdom began distributing blankets, food, ice, and water. HMS Cardiff, a Royal Navy Type 42 destroyer, was the operational guard ship at the time and assisted in relief operations in and around the Gregorytown area. In addition, assistance came from Canada, Japan, and the United States, as well as the United Nations. The American Red Cross delivered 100 tents, 100 rolls of plastic sheeting, and 1,000 cots. Rebuilding began quickly on the hardest hit islands. However, trees and vegetation were expected to take years to recover. Despite reconstruction efforts and the small number of resort lodgings affected (around 2%), officials expected a 10–20% decline in tourism. The Government of the Bahamas, observing that their response mechanisms were not sufficient, reformed the National Emergency and Management Agency.

The passage of the hurricane disrupted several breeding colonies of the white-crowned pigeon throughout the country. Though the hurricane did not affect many tourist areas, officials predicted a decline in tourism by up to 20% in the months after the storm.

=== United States ===
After assessing the devastation in Florida and Louisiana, U.S. President George H. W. Bush initially proposed a $7.1 billion aid package to provide disaster benefits, small-business loans, agricultural recovery, food stamps, and public housing for victims of Hurricane Andrew. After the House of Representatives appropriated aid to victims of Hurricane Iniki in Hawaii and Typhoon Omar in Guam, the cost was later increased to $11.1 billion. The bill, which was the most costly disaster aid package at the time, was passed by Congress as House Resolution 5620 on September 18, and signed into law by President Bush on September 23. The state of Florida alone received $9 billion through the disaster relief bill.

The Federal Emergency Management Agency (FEMA) was criticized for its slow response in both Florida and Louisiana. Even a month prior to Andrew, the House Committee on Appropriations – which oversees the budget for FEMA – released a report calling the agency a "political dumping ground" and a "turkey farm" due to its "weak, inexperienced leaders". Congressman S. William Green of New York, a member of the Appropriations Committee, stated that he believed the agency learned little from its botched response to Hurricane Hugo in 1989. However, Green also criticized local officials for expecting "them [FEMA] to come and run the whole show". Some FEMA officials responded that it was impossible to respond as they had been requested while also continuing to provide aid for the Los Angeles riots. FEMA spokesman Grant Peterson stated, "24 hours is not reasonable to expect to have all the resources of the federal government landing in the middle of a disaster." Some responsibility for the slow response must rest with Florida Governor Lawton Chiles, who waited five days to submit the formal request for Federal assistance that FEMA officials believed was required before they were empowered to act.

==== Florida ====
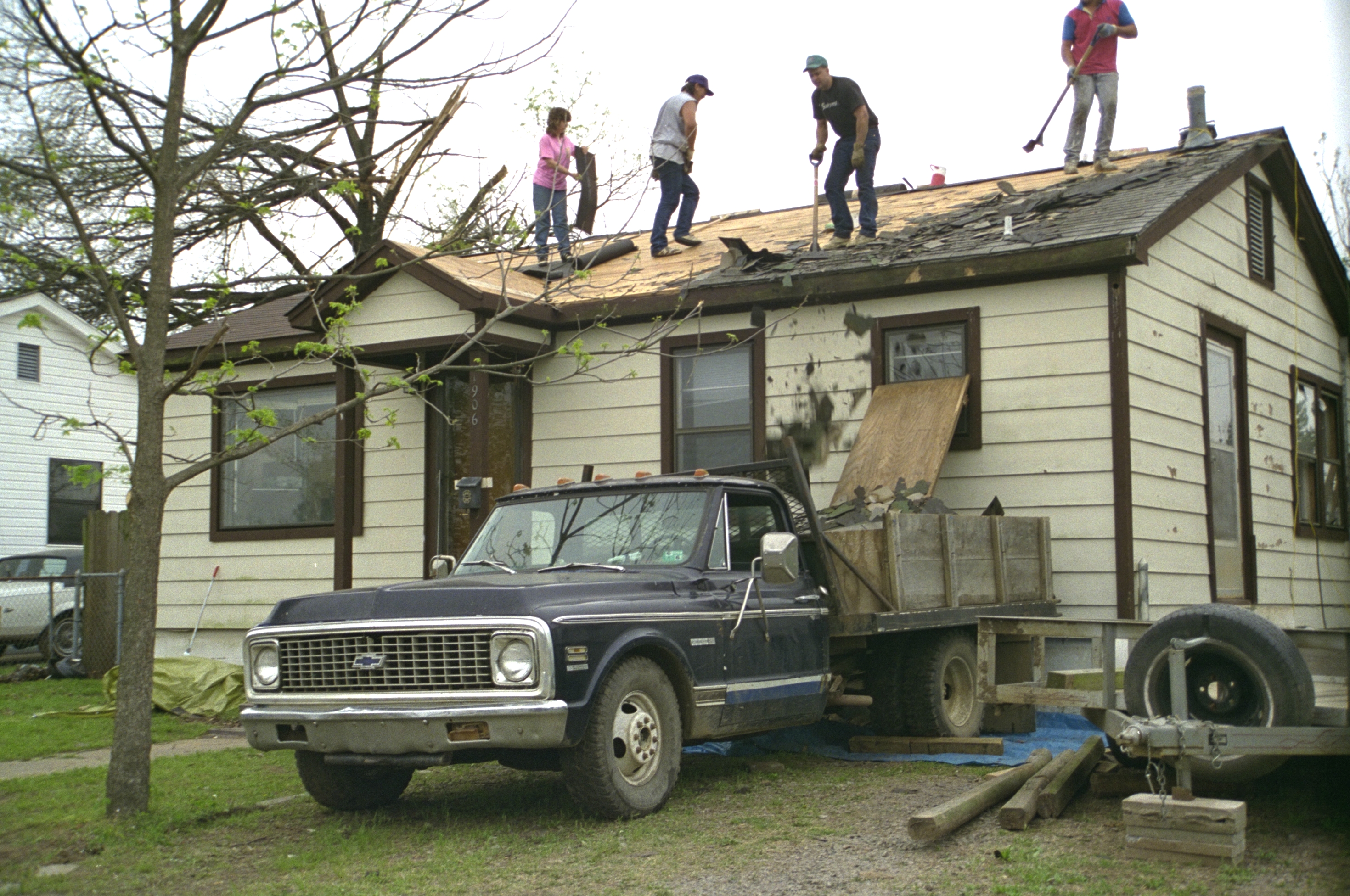
Clean-up after Hurricane Andrew in Dade County

President George H. W. Bush declared the region a disaster area and provided public assistance to victims in counties Broward, Collier, Dade, and Monroe. Governor Lawton Chiles considered asking the Florida Legislature to raise taxes but instead signed a bill into law on December 17 that created a three-year reserve fund for losses to uninsured businesses, homes, government, and school buildings and functions. The bill allowed South Floridians to keep an estimated $500 million in sales tax generated by rebuilding efforts.

Crime, especially looting and theft, rose sharply in the areas south of Miami immediately after Andrew. Reports indicate that merchandise was stolen at damaged or destroyed shopping centers in southern Dade County, and looting occurred in neighborhoods severely affected by the storm. To provide temporary housing for the homeless, military personnel initially set up a total of five tent cities in Florida City and Homestead, while a sixth tent city was opened at the Miccosukee Indian Reservation shortly after Labor Day weekend. The Government of Canada dispatched a team of 90 military engineers to repair community centers, hospitals, and schools, and a crew of 300 military personnel was sent to Miami via HMCS Protecteur to assist American relief teams.

In the aftermath of the storm, extensive psychological effects were documented, including increased divorce rates and a spike in post-traumatic stress disorder (PTSD). A panel of psychiatrists and psychologists at the University of Miami agreed that as many as 90% of residents in the worst impacted areas would experience at least a few symptoms of PTSD. Within six months, the circumstances related to the aftermath of Andrew led to at least five suicides and four homicides.

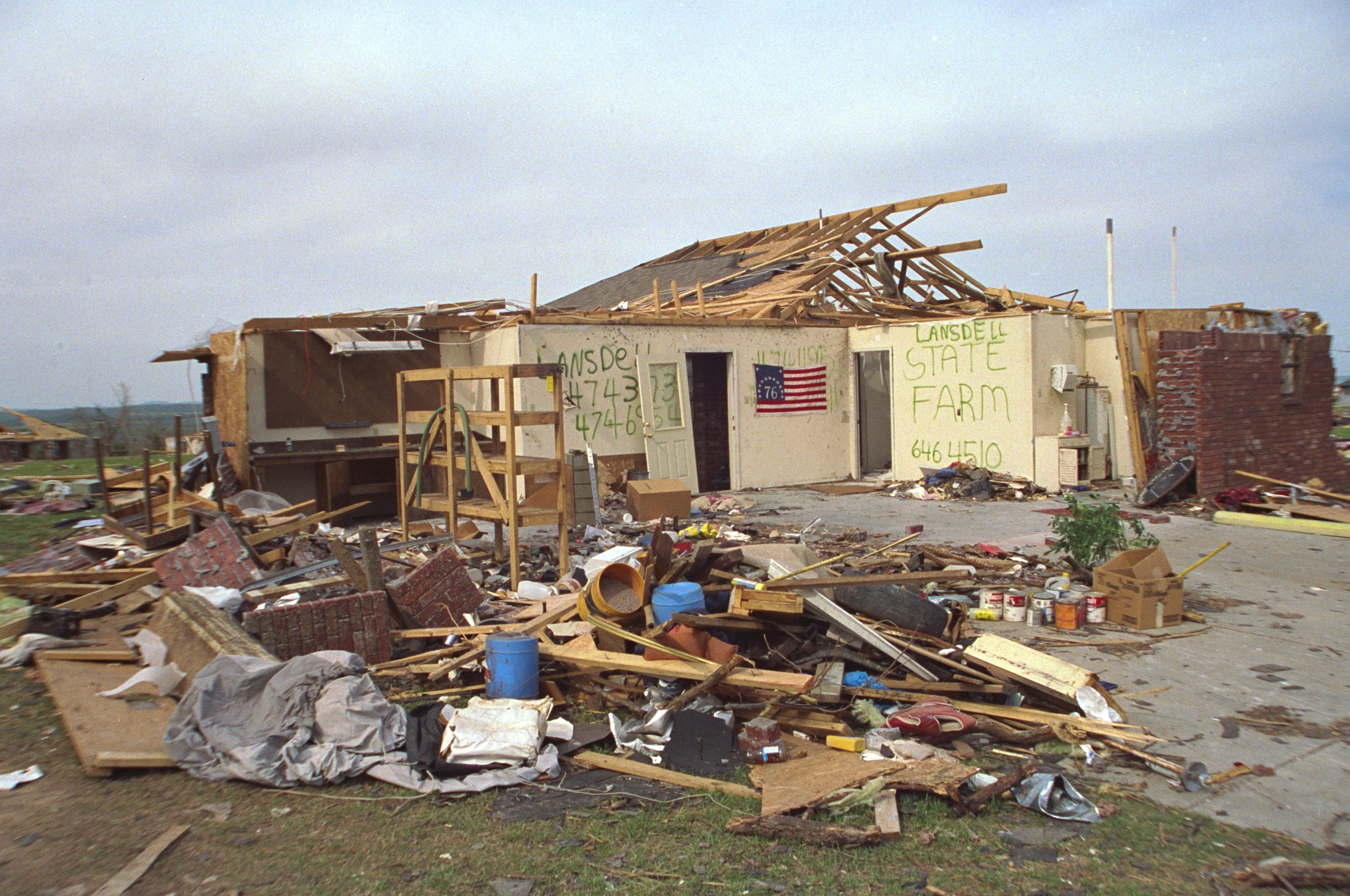
A home destroyed by the storm

As homes were being rebuilt, FEMA provided free temporary mobile homes for 3,501 families and financial assistance to more than 40,000 other families for staying in hotel rooms, paying rent, and repairing homes. Nearly two years after Andrew, about 70% of homes in Homestead that were damaged or destroyed were repaired or rebuilt. Additionally, of the homes destroyed or severely damaged throughout Dade County, 36,000 had been restored by July 1994.

Over 930,000 policyholders in South Florida lost coverage after 11 insurance companies went bankrupt, resulting in over 600,000 insurance claims. The Florida Legislature created new entities like the Joint Underwriting Association, Florida Windstorm Underwriting Association, and Florida Hurricane Catastrophe Fund to restore insurance capacity. Stricter building codes were established in Florida after Hurricane Andrew. A survey by Timothy P. Marshall and Richard Herzog of the Haag Engineer Company in Carrollton, Texas, highlighted construction issues in homes. Concrete tiles were glued to felt paper, while shingles were stapled perpendicular to the long axis, allowing them to be torn away. This exposed plywood and prefabricated trusses to weather, leading to structural failure and roof collapses.

In 1996 Governor Chiles established the Florida Building Codes Study Commission to assess and improve the system. The Florida Building Code was established in 1998 and put into effect by 2002, replacing local laws and regulations with universal statewide building codes. After hurricanes Charley, Frances, Ivan, and Jeanne in 2004, a study by the University of Florida found that homes built under the new code sustained less damage on average than those built between 1994 and 2001. A report by the Florida Legislature in 2006 and after hurricanes Dennis, Katrina, and Wilma in 2005 also concluded that the Florida Building Code is working.

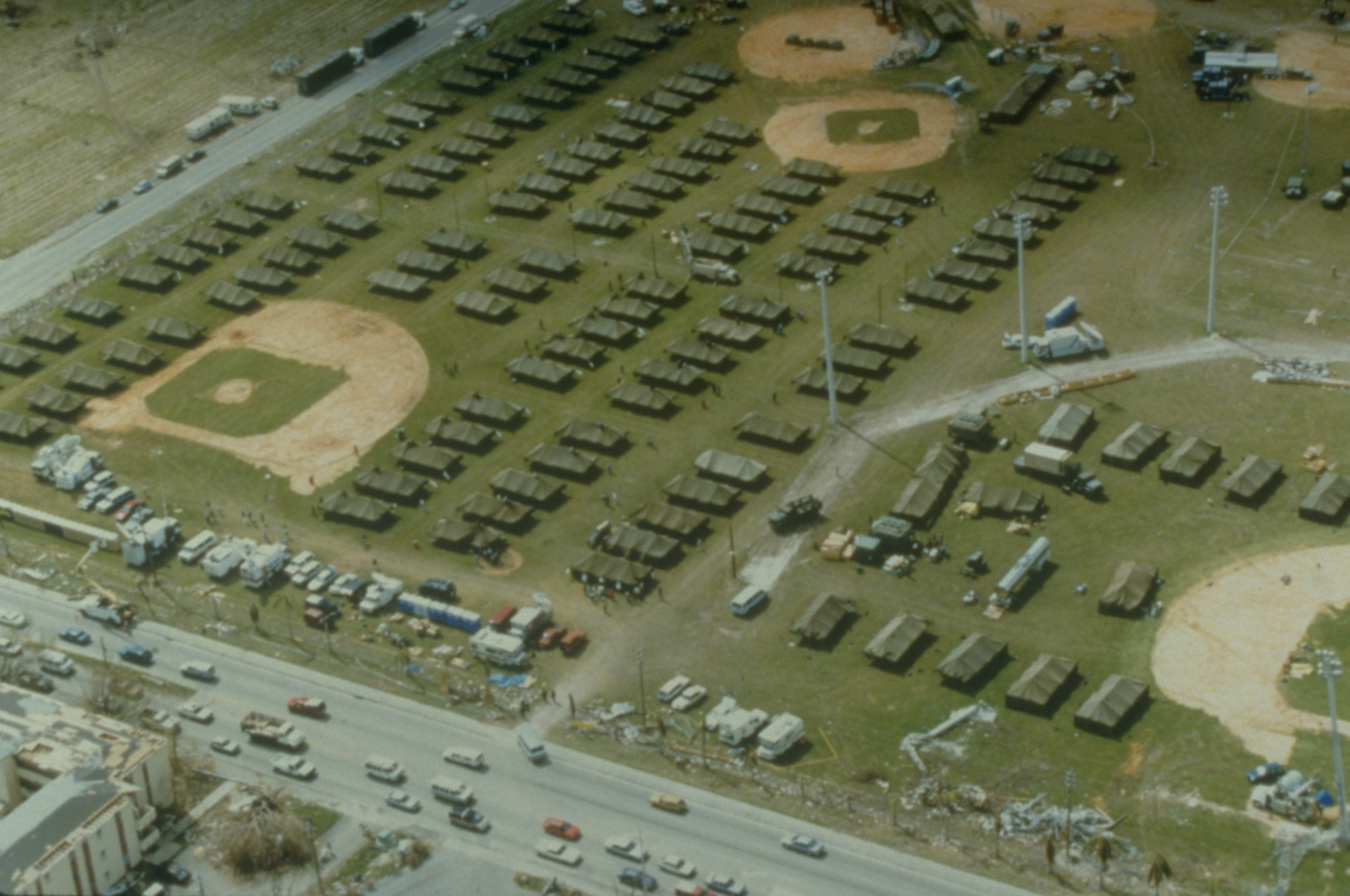
Tent cities were constructed to house displaced residents.

The hurricane also transformed Dade County, with a migration of mostly White families northward to Broward and Palm Beach County, which was accelerated after Andrew. Many Jews relocated to areas with significant Jewish populations. The county experienced a net loss of about 36,000 people in 1992, while Broward and Palm Beach counties gained about 17,000 and 2,300 residents, respectively. The Hispanic population in the southern part of Dade County climbed rapidly, with the Latino population in Homestead increasing from 30% to 45% between 1990 and 2000.

==== Louisiana ====
On August 26, George H. W. Bush toured devastated areas of Louisiana with Governor Edwin Edwards. President Bush remarked, "The destruction from this storm goes beyond anything we have known in recent years," but noted that damage was less severe than in Florida. After his visit to Louisiana, President Bush declared only Terrebonne Parish as a disaster area, but later included 34 other parishes under this declaration. FEMA initially opened five field offices throughout Louisiana. These centers allowed residents to submit applications for aid. After Franklin mayor Sam Jones and Congressman Billy Tauzin criticized FEMA for failing to open a field office in Franklin, FEMA promised to do so. In the first few days following the storm, Louisiana National Guard members and local residents worked to remove debris such as downed trees, roofing shingles, and torn aluminum siding. The state National Guard also dispatched water purification units and tanks with filled potable water. About 1,300 National Guardsmen were deployed to southern Louisiana.

In early September, officials announced that 1,400 mobile homes, homes, and apartments would become available to residents whose dwellings became uninhabitable. House Resolution 5620 also included disaster aid to the state of Louisiana. In early December, the Small Business Administration (SBA) approved $33.2 million worth of low-interest loans for repairs to homes and businesses. By then, FEMA had received about 43,600 applications for aid, while approving $35.9 million in grants to over 18,000 households that were ineligible for loans from the SBA or were uninsured. In addition to the mobile homes already provided, FEMA spent $22.6 million on disaster housing.

=== Retirement ===
Due to the hurricane's impact and damage, the World Meteorological Organization retired the name Andrew from its rotating Atlantic hurricane name lists in the spring of 1993, and it will never again be used for another Atlantic hurricane. It was replaced with Alex for the 1998 season.

== See also ==
- Timeline of the 1992 Atlantic hurricane season
- List of Category 5 Atlantic hurricanes
- List of Florida hurricanes (1975–1999)
- 1926 Miami hurricane – A Category 4 hurricane that caused catastrophic damage when it moved directly over Miami
- 1947 Fort Lauderdale hurricane – Another destructive Category 4 hurricane that took a similar track
- Hurricane Betsy (1965) – Another devastating Category 4 storm that took a similar track in August–September 1965 in The Bahamas, southern Florida and eastern Louisiana
- Hurricane Georges (1998) – Another Category 4 hurricane that caused major damage in Florida and Louisiana
- Hurricane Katrina (2005) – A Category 5 hurricane that took a similar track and devastated New Orleans and parts of Florida
- Hurricane Michael (2018) – Also made a very destructive impact in Florida as a Category 5 hurricane
- Hurricane Dorian (2019) – A Category 5 hurricane that devastated the Northern Bahamas when it stalled over it at peak intensity

== Notes ==
Preceded by Hugo	Costliest Atlantic hurricanes on record 1992	Succeeded by Katrina
