= Builders Challenge =

The Builders Challenge is a high-performance housing recognition initiative led by the U.S. Department of Energy (DOE) Office of Energy Efficiency and Renewable Energy through its Building Technologies Program.

== Description ==
The voluntary program with incentives was announced by the DOE on 14 February 2008. Through the Builders Challenge, participating homebuilders can more easily differentiate their high energy-performance homes from other less energy-efficient products in the marketplace by means of a standardized energy rating system. "Best energy-performing" is defined by the DOE as scoring 70 or lower on the EnergySmart Home Scale (E-Scale), that is, at least 30 percent more efficient than a typical home built per the 2004 International Energy Conservation Code. The Builders Challenge aims for 1.3 million homes scoring 70 or lower to be constructed by 2030 thereby saving $1.7 billion in energy costs per DOE estimate.

"DOE's ultimate vision is that, by 2030, a consumer will have the opportunity to buy an affordable net zero energy home (NZEH) anywhere in the United States - a grid-connected home that, over the course of a year, produces as much energy as it uses."

Builders can meet the Challenge through any one of three different pathways: performance, prescriptive, or partner/HERS provider. The Builders Challenge Quality Criteria and Technology Information Packets (followed under the prescriptive path) are based on over a decade of Building America's building science R&D. Both the Builders Challenge and the Building America programs advance the ability to build cost-effective net zero and high performance homes.

Requirements for builders to meet the Builders Challenge at energy.gov. Information for individuals interested becoming a Builders Challenge third-party verifier is also available at the site.

== EnergySmart Home Scale ==
The EnergySmart Home Scale provides a visible means of comparing the overall energy-efficiency of homes, analogous to fuel-economy ratings on new motor vehicles or Energy Star ratings on major electrical appliances. Homes that meet or exceed the minimum standards of Builders Challenge receive an E-Scale sunburst sticker, alerting prospective buyers or renters to the home's energy performance. For example, a 64 on the E-Scale indicates the home is approximately 36 percent more energy efficient than a typical new home built to code. "Builders may place the E-Scale on or near the home's electric panel to show potential homeowners the energy performance achieved by that particular home or model."

== Dual certification ==
The Builders Challenge program has formed partnerships with the nation's leading green home labeling programs.

- National Green Building Standard homes can qualify for both programs using the free online Green Scoring Tool
- EarthCraft House has aligned their Gold-level certification to meet the Builders Challenge.
- LEED for Homes
- Environments for Living

== See also ==
- EnergySmart Home Scale
