= NAHBGreen =

NAHBGreen is another name for the National Green Building Program of the National Association of Home Builders, an organization based in the United States.

== National Green Building Certification ==
There are two rating systems available to score green projects: The NAHB Model Green Building Guidelines for new single-family homes and the National Green Building Standard for new single-family and multifamily construction, residential remodeling and renovation, and subdivision development.

Both rating systems are used as design tools for building professionals to plan their green projects. They are also scoring tools, providing the list of green choices made so that inspectors can test and verify the results. Finally, they are used for certification, so that a third party, the NAHB Research Center, can review the inspector's documentation and certify that the project is authentically green. Builders can apply to certify their homes with both the National Green Building Standard and Builders Challenge using the free online Green Scoring Tool.

The NAHBGreen website provides instructions for the scoring tools and certification process. A list of accredited verifiers is also provided at the site.
