= EnergySmart Home Scale =

The EnergySmart Home Scale (E-Scale) is a standard applied to homes in the USA that meet the Builders Challenge program requirements. The E-Scale visually shows the energy performance of the labeled home. Homes need to score a 70 or less on the E-Scale to qualify for the Builders Challenge.

The E-Scale is based on the 2004 International Energy Conservation Code, with a 100 equating to a code built home. A home that scores a 70 on the E-Scale is 30% more energy efficient than a code built home. The E-Scale allows for an easy comparison between homes, very similar to a MPG sticker for a car but for a home. Homes meeting the Challenge will receive an E-Scale with a Sunburst displaying the E-Scale rating of the home, enabling home buyers to easily compare the energy performance of homes.

The E-Scale ends at zero, which equates to the Builders Challenge goal to provide a "net zero energy home (NZEH) anywhere in the United States - a grid-connected home that, over the course of a year, produces as much energy as it uses"

The Builders Challenge program and E-Scale requirements are based on years of research results from the United States Department of Energy's Building America program. Building America research "is expected to achieve cost-neutral Net-Zero Energy Homes by 2020. "Cost-neutral" means that the added first costs of system enhancements (when amortized over a 30-year period) are equal to the monthly energy cost savings that result from these enhancements. While the Building America program develops and field-tests the technologies needed to cost-effectively move to higher levels of efficiency, the Builders Challenge will promote the implementation of proven strategies that builders can implement in any climate region."

== See also ==
- Energy law#United States
