= Florida Building Code =

Building code in Florida, United States

The Florida Building Code (FBC) is a set of standards designed by the Florida Building Commission for the construction of buildings in the US state of Florida. Many regulations and guidelines distributed are important benchmarks regarding hurricane protection. Miami-Dade County was the first in Florida to certify hurricane-resistant standards for structures which the Florida Building Code subsequently enacted across all requirements for hurricane-resistant buildings. Many other states reference the requirements set in the Florida Building codes, or have developed their own requirements for hurricanes.

The Florida Building Code is also based upon the International Building Code (IBC) used in the United States.

== History ==
Prior to Hurricane Andrew in 1992, Florida had building codes at each county and municipality, 400+ in total. There were no unified wind standards. The destruction of 63,500 homes created new product categories and the nation's strictest building code. The 1994 South Florida Building Code created High-Velocity Hurricane Zones (HVHZ) and each subsequent major hurricane prompted specific changes to the code.

== Hurricane guidelines ==
The 2010 edition of the Florida Building Code introduced significant changes to wind load design, in particular the presentation of the wind speed maps.

The Miami-Dade and Broward County norms, are both included in the High-Velocity Hurricane Zones (HVHZ) and contain more stringent requirements. Other counties such as Palm Beach County do not require the same HVHZ building standards for compliance with the Florida Building Codes.

Risk categories for wind speeds in High Velocity Hurricane Zones (HVHZ)
| Miami Dade County | |
|---|---|
| Risk Category I: Buildings & Structures | 165 mph |
| Risk Category II: Buildings & Structures | 175 mph |
| Risk Category III: Buildings & Structures | 185 mph |
| Broward County | |
| Risk Category I: Buildings & Structures | 156 mph |
| Risk Category II: Buildings & Structures | 170 mph |
| Risk Category III: Buildings & Structures | 180 mph |

Both Miami-Dade County and the State of Florida maintain web-searchable databases of products approved for use as hurricane protection. These typically include not only actual test results from certified independent testing laboratories, they also contain "Product Approval Drawings" or "Installation Instructions" which provide specifications for hurricane shutter assembly and installation.

Impact tests conducted on building materials are measured and tested via TAS201, 202 and 203.

== Present status ==
A review following Hurricane Milton in 2024 showed that no homes built after the unified Florida Building Code (FBC) was adopted March 1, 2002 were destroyed. Approximately 4.7 million homes in Florida predate the modern FBC. Any renovation, addition, or major work (such as roof replacement or electrical/plumbing overhaul) that requires a permit must comply with the current active code. The FBC 8th Edition (2023) became effective on December 31, 2023. The upcoming 9th Edition (2026) is scheduled to take effect on December 31, 2026.

== See also ==
- International Building Code (IBC)
