= International Energy Conservation Code =

The International Energy Conservation Code (IECC) is a building code created by the International Code Council in 2000. It is a model code adopted by many states and municipal governments in the United States for the establishment of minimum design and construction requirements for energy efficiency. The code is updated every 3 years, to provide an ongoing standard of best practices for energy efficiency.

In addition to overall building standards the code defines the Climate Zones used in building, shown in this picture. These should not be confused with the USDA plant Hardiness zone.

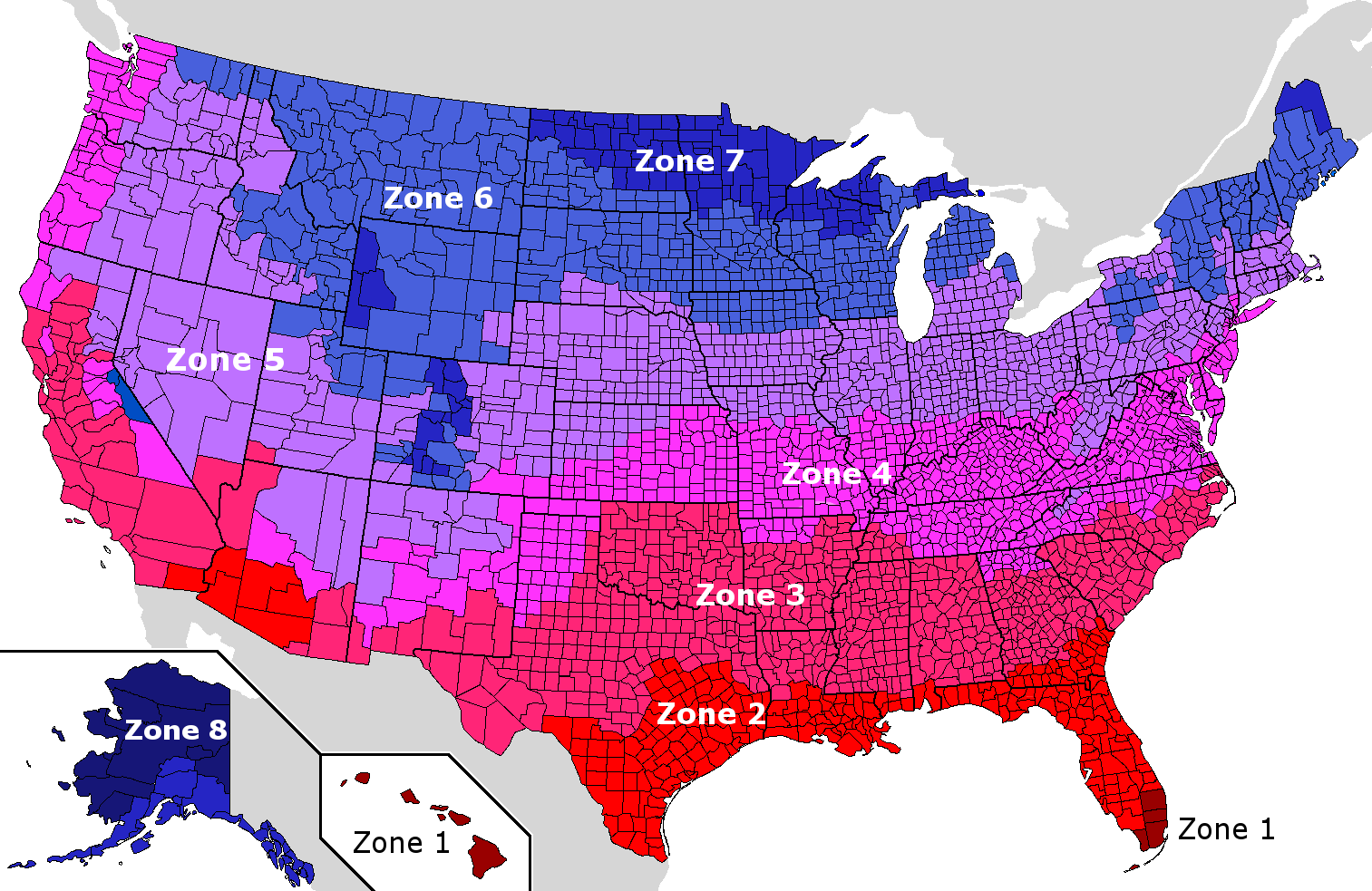
pre-2021 United States IECC Climate Zone

== See also ==
- EnergySmart Home Scale
