= EarthCraft House =

EarthCraft House is one of five programs within the EarthCraft suite of regional green building standards. The EarthCraft Program was created in 1999 as a partnership between the Greater Atlanta Home Builders Association and Southface Energy Institute and teaches builders the latest methods of resource and energy-efficient construction.

EarthCraft House certifications are determined through a points-based worksheet, which allows builders to select the sustainability measures that are best suited for their project. A project can be certified, gold, or platinum, depending on how many points are achieved. The highest level of certification is platinum. Worksheet items address proper site planning, energy-efficient appliances and lighting, resource-efficient building materials, indoor air quality, water conservation and homebuyer education, and all are verified during site visits and inspections. EarthCraft-certified homes must also pass diagnostic tests for air infiltration and duct leakage standards, and homes certified at the gold or platinum levels must meet ENERGY STAR requirements. EarthCraft Technical Advisors provide technical assistance to the builder during the initial design review and throughout project design and construction.

The ECH program requires each house to be inspected and tested beforehand so that any problems involving the building envelope, or heating and cooling systems can be identified and fixed before the homeowner moves in.

To date, more than 30,000 EarthCraft homes, multifamily units and commercial buildings have been certified.

== See also ==
- Alternative natural materials
