= Hydraform International =

South African manufacturer of brick and blockmaking machines

Hydraform International Pty Ltd. is a manufacturer of brick and blockmaking machines. It was founded in Johannesburg, South Africa. The company specialises in brick and blockmaking machines and accessories that enable the development of a stabilised soil cement block or a compressed earth block (CEB). Their products include stabilised soil blockmaking machines, pan mixing machines that are used to create the mixture for the blockmaking mixtures and accessories for these machines. The brick that is created by their machines is an interlocking stabilised soil cement block that is made using a mixture of soil, water and Portland Cement.

Hydraform International sells their products to both a local and international market with both commercial and residential uses. These equipment is presently used in 50 countries. It also provides a training program and conducts training academies on how to use their machines and maintain them.

== History ==
Hydraform International Pty Ltd. was founded by Jochen Kofahl in 1988. Jochen Kofahl partnered with Robert Plattner. Hydraform International first operated in Jochen Kofahl’s garage. Hydraform International is now headquartered in Johannesburg with offices in India, Nigeria and Uganda. The first Hydrafrom machine created was the M1 machine. The company offers blockmaking machines and training services.

== Notable projects ==
In 2007, a post-conflict strategy by the Ugandan Government was implemented. This strategy was launched in response to the political and rebel conflicts in Uganda. This was called the Peace, Recovery and Development plan. Hydraform International was contracted to help rebuild communities through a low-cost housing project and stimulating the local economy through job creation.

In 2009, construction on Rogbere School of Excellence in Sierra Leone began. This project was funded by Irish NGO Emmaus and NGO, A Call to Business. Hydraform technology was procured for its mobility and cost-savings advantages. The junior was completed by September, 2010. In 2012, A Call to Business funded the construction of an orphanage within the same village. Construction was completed in 2013 using Hydraform interlocking blocks.

In 2010, all 20 buildings for the Ongutoi Health Centre in Uganda were built using Hydraform International’s blockmaking systems. The project was funded by a charity organisation, High Adventure Gospel Communications Ministers, who praised Hydraform International for the cost advantages obtained that would not have occurred had standard building methods been chosen. The cost advantages stemmed from not having to import materials as the block were made on site with materials that were sourced on site and not needing mortar to bond the bricks. Hydraform International was also praised for the training of unskilled labourers in Uganda on Hydraform machines. Hydraform International facilitated skills transfer to labourers within the local community.

In 2010, Hydraform International machines were procured for a resettlement project by the Endeavour Mining Corporation. Endeavour Mining Corporation needed to resettle 2,200 residents in Ghana before opening a mine. Hydraform International provided two machines which saw the projects being completed by 2013.

In 2010, Aumazo Inc., a non-profit organisation, acquired a Hydraform International blockmaking machine that is capable of producing 1,500 bricks per day. By 2012, the machine manufactured 26,000 blocks which were used to finish a library for boarding school in Cameroon. Hydraform International also organised a technician to train labourers on machine usage and maintenance on site.

In 2010, the Krizevac Project, a NGO started the construction of the Mother Teresa Children’s Centre North in Malawi. The centre was completed in 2013 using Hydraform blocks. Krizevac Project formed the Beehive Centre for Social enterprise. The Beehive Centre acquired Hydraform machines and now offers vocational training and produces Hydraform bricks.

Another project is the Giba Business Park in South Africa. The project was completed in 2011. The developers of Giba Business Park aimed for the use of sustainable business practices and cost-saving advantages. Two Hydraform blocking making machines were used for this project. By using the Hydraforrm Machines, the Green Building Council of South Africa were able to lessen their carbon footprint because blockmaking process could happen on site unlike standard bricks that would need to transported to the site. Alongside this, Hydraform International enabled the construction costs to be reduced because there were no mortar costs as the blocks did not need to be cemented together.

In 2012, the Department of Public Works in South Africa elected Hydraform International building systems for a rural housing development located in the Gombani Village in Zimbabwe. The remoteness of the village meant that Hydraform’s mobile blockmaking systems were suitable solutions. The mobile building systems also resolved the issue of transportation costs to a remote village.

In 2012, the Savannah Accelerated Development Authority (SADA) acquired 50 Hydraform machines as a solution to a sustainable housing scheme in under-developed regions. Hydraform technicians conducted training on how to select soil, use the machines and construct public buildings . Hydraform International was selected to promote ecologically sustainable building methods.

In 2015, Hospital Saint Jean-Baptiste was inaugurated in Côte d’Ivoire. The development of the hospital had a focus on job and skills creation. Hydraform International was contracted to train local labourers on how to use their machines and facilitate blockmaking skill transfers to the local community. The project also aimed to utilise locally sourced materials.

In 2016, the Department of Rural Development and Land Reform unveiled 27 new low-cost homes built using Hydraform machines and bricks. The homes were built for displaced families in the Eastern Cape. Hydraform International supplied machinery and trained members of the Radway Green Farm community on the usage of the machine which enabled community members to employed for the construction of the homes.

In Tanzania, Hydraform International enabled the construction of 201 houses for the Kibada project by the National Housing Corporation Tanzania (NHC). In 2017, Hydraform International provided their M7MI range machines which produced 2000 blocks per day and resulted in the project being finished for 30% fewer than the cost anticipated for a project using non-interlocking bricks and mortar.

== Training academy ==
Hydraform International also provides businesses who have procured their machines with training of skilled and unskilled labourers. Hydraform sends technicians to projects with Hydraform building systems to train labourers on site and conducts training academies to ensure that clients succeed at block formation. Both unskilled and skilled labourers are trained on how to select soil as input for the block formation and how to construct Hydraform blocks. Hydraform trains labourers on how to conduct soil tests and curing of blocks to ensure clients who have contracted Hydraform International are earning a return on their investment . Training is also provided on machine maintenance. The training academy has both theoretical and practical components. Hydraform’s training services have been contracted on projects such as the Radway Green Farm project to promote skill transfer within rural communities. The training academy seeks to address job creation through skills transfer and community engagement.

== Hydraform Blocks ==
The Hydraform Interlocking Soil Block (hydraform block) is an interlocking earth block used in many countries for construction purposes. The hydraform block is made from soil cement which is a mixture of soil, cement and water, and is hydraulically compressed to form a high quality interlocking soil block. Soil from the building site can be used to manufacture building blocks. Sandcrete and landcrete are similar materials but are not compressed.

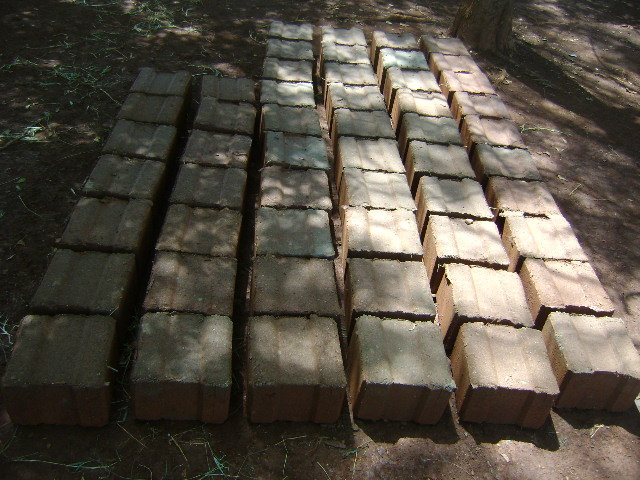
Hydraform interlocking blocks.

The Hydraform compressed earth block is very popular due to the cost savings that are involved during the construction process as only around 30% of the structure requires mortar between the blocks. Due to the interlocking nature of the stabilized soil block, unskilled labour can be utilised in construction thereby empowering rural communities and creating jobs.

The blocks interlock top to bottom and front to back. Blocks dimensions are 220 millimetres (8.7 in) wide, 115 millimetres (4.5 in) high and 230 millimetres (9.1 in) long. It weighs approximately 12 kilograms (26 lb). Once blocks are manufactured it is "wet cured" for a period of 14–21 days to reach desired strength.

== Hydraform Blockmaking process ==
Hydraform International has a product range of six machines that can develop stabilised soil cement blocks. The block is made out of a mixture of soil, water and 5% to 10% Portland Cement is required and placed in a Hydraform pan mixer. The mixture has to be an equal balance of moist and dry to have the structural integrity of a brick. To determine whether the mixture is satisfactory, a drop test can be done, this is where the user drops a segment of the brick on the floor from a height of one metre to see how it shatters. The user can identify whether the brick is too moist or too dry based on the number of segment it shatters into. The mixture must be consistently used to ensure that the blocks do not have surface irregularities. When the mixture has set, it is poured into a Hydraform series blockmaking machine. Hydraulic pressure is used to compress the mixture into a mould of a block with interlocking depressions on its sides. The depressions on the outsides of the block allow for a “lock-and-key” mechanism where each block can be connected to another with the same depression. As a result of being able to connect the blocks, the need for mortar is diminished as the blocks do not have to be cemented together like a standard brick. This process can occur on-site as Hydraform machines are mobile . After the blocks have been developed, a labourer can connect using the grooves in each brick in a vertical and horizontal direction. The dimensions of the blocks created by a Hydraform series machine are generally 220mm, however they can be moulded to a block that is 150mm.

== Benefits of Hydraform blocks ==
Hydraform blockmaking equipment can be powered by electric motors or by diesel, this allows the equipment to be mobile and to be used onsite. As production can occur onsite, transportation costs can be minimised. The process of interlocking blocks is also cost-effective as the blocks are dry-stacked to create a wall as opposed to the standard masonry practices where the blocks are laid and cemented by mortar. Hydraform blocks are interlocked instead of laid and pasted together using mortar as seen in standard brickwork. By being dry-stacked, the amount of mortar required is reduced and this can waive the cost of mortar that is generally required in masonry work. Interlocking blocks produced by Hydraform can allow for the recycling of materials. Any remaining mixture of the blocks can be used as an input for the Hydraform machine while on site. High-waged skilled labour is not required for the production of the Hydraform blocks. Hydraform International can provide a base course to train users of Hydraform equipment and after this course, the masons are qualified to construct and dry stack the interlocking blocks. The length of the process to create a wall using the interlocking blocks is shorter than standard brickwork as the blocks do not have to be laid and individually cemented by mortar. The materials needed for the block mixture can be sourced locally as the mixture is made up of water, soil and Portland Cement so there is no impending risk of scarcity and on-site soil can be utilised for the soil component of the mixture. A potential benefit is that structural integrity of buildings using interlocking blocks cannot be damaged by termites like timber constructions are in rural Africa. Hydraform has also been contracted by developers who were motivated to reduce their carbon footprint by reducing their transport costs from transporting materials.

== Criticisms of Hydraform blocks ==
The mixture of the interlocking blocks must be a specific consistency. If the mixture is too dry, it will collapse after it has been hydraulically pressed and if the mixture has too much water, it cannot be solidified. This means that the process of construction will be lengthened if the mixture is not the required consistency. For the blocks to be successfully interlocked, each block must be uniform in size so users of the Hydraform blockmaking machine must be aware of how much mixture is being poured into the blockmaking machine each time to avoid over or under-pouring. Standard brickwork continues to be used over interlocking masonry, this means that the workforce trained to produce and construct interlocking blocks is limited. As the walls built with interlocking blocks are not reinforced by plaster or mortar, reinforcement using plaster might be required to ensure that wall is durable in weather conditions such as rain and wind. The Hydraform machines used to develop these interlocking blocks on site need constant maintenance to ensure that they are powered and are regularly monitored for any defects. To successfully build a dry-stacked wall with interlocking blocks, the blocks must interlock in perfect horizontal and vertical alignment. This cannot be achieved if the machine is not producing uniform-sized blocks. Interlocking masonry is still not the common form of masonry in construction so it is a relatively new as opposed to standard brickwork, this means that the durability of these blocks has not been seen in environments other than rural developments. There is also the risk of erosion from weather conditions such as winds or rain that could threaten the stability of the blocks.
