= Soil block =

A soil block is a block (rectangular lump) of soil, with or without additional modifying ingredients. Soil blocking is the act of making such blocks. There are two kinds:

- Compressed earth block, a medium-sized or large soil block (earth block) used for building construction
- Smaller soil blocks (typically 3 to 10 cm per side), used instead of pots or flats in growing seedlings for transplant
