= Sandcrete =

Building material

Sandcrete is a yellow-white building material made from a binder (typically Portland cement), sand in a ratio of circa 1:8, and water. Sometimes other ingredients may be added to reduce the amount of expensive Portland cement such as pozzolanas and rice husk ash. Sandcrete is similar but weaker than mortar, for which the ratio is circa 1:5. Soil cement and landcrete are similar materials but use other types of soil and hydraform blocks which are compressed, stabilized, earth blocks.

Sandcrete is usually used as hollow rectangular blocks similar to concrete masonry units, often 45 centimetres (18 in) wide, 15 centimetres (5.9 in) thick, and 30 centimetres (12 in) with hollows that run from top to bottom and occupy around one third of the volume of the block. The blocks are joined together with mortar.

== Strength and usage ==
The final compressive strength of sandcrete can be as high as 4.6 N/mm^{2}, which is much less than concrete's 40 N/mm^{2}. Sandcrete is unsuitable for load-bearing columns, and is mainly used for walls, or for foundations if no suitable alternative is available. As material for walls, its strength is less than that of fired clay bricks, but sandcrete is considerably cheaper.

Sandcrete is the main building material for walls of single-storey buildings (such as houses and schools) in countries such as Ghana and Nigeria.

Research has shown using organic ash to replace Portland cement, which is better than simply using less Portland cement.

== Coarse aggregate ==
Addition of coarse aggregates has been tried, since this is a cheap way to increase compressive strength, but since the cement content of sandcrete is small, so is the amount of water that is added to the sand/cement mix to cure it. Adding more solid materials makes the mix much less fluid, making it difficult to cast into blocks.
