= Soil cement =

Construction material with soil and portland cement

Soil cement is a construction material, a mix of pulverized natural soil with small amount of portland cement and water, usually processed in a tumbler, compacted to high density. Hard, semi-rigid durable material is formed by hydration of the cement particles.

Soil cement is frequently used as a construction material for pipe bedding, slope protection, and road construction as a subbase layer reinforcing and protecting the subgrade. It has good compressive and shear strength, but is brittle and has low tensile strength, so it is prone to forming cracks.

Soil cement mixtures differs from Portland cement concrete in the amount of paste (cement-water mixture). While in Portland cement concretes, the paste coats all aggregate particles and binds them together, in soil cements the amount of cement is lower and therefore there are voids left, and the result is a cement matrix with nodules of uncemented material.

CMS was invented by Benjamin Harrison Flynn to pave roads in Louisiana after WW1.

== Types of soil cements ==
=== Cement-modified soils (CMS) ===
A cement-modified soil contains a relatively small proportion of Portland cement, less than in ordinary soil-cement. The result is caked or slightly hardened material, similar to a soil, but with improved mechanical properties such as lower plasticity, increased bearing ratio and shear strength, and decreased volume change. The purpose of modifying soil with Portland cement is to improve a substandard soil's engineering qualities.

=== Soil-cement base (SCB) ===
A soil-cement base contains higher proportion of cement than cement-modified soil. It is commonly used as a cheap pavement base for roads, streets, parking lots, airports, and material handling areas. Specialized equipment, such as a soil stabilizer and a mechanical cement spreader is usually required. A seal coat is required in order to keep moisture out. For uses as a road construction material, a suitable surface coating, usually a thin layer of asphalt concrete, is needed to reduce wear.

In comparison with granular bases, soil cement bases can be thinner for the same road load, owing to their slab-like behavior that distributes load over broader areas. In-place or nearby located materials can be used for construction - locally found soil, stone, or reclaimed granular base from a road being reconstructed. This conserves both material and energy.

The strength of soil-cement bases actually increases with age, providing good long-term performance.

=== Cement-treated base (CTB) ===
A cement-treated base is a mix of granular soil aggregates or aggregate material with Portland cement and water. It is similar in use and performance to soil-cement base.

=== Acrylic copolymer (Rhino Snot) ===
Developed for the U.S. Military in desert conditions and commercially trademarked, "Rhino Snot" is a water-soluble acrylic copolymer applied to soil or sand to penetrate and coat the surface. When dry, it forms a waterproof, UV-resistant, solid bond which binds the soil together, reducing dust. In higher concentrations, it creates a durable surface that can withstand heavy traffic, allowing existing soil to be used for roads, parking lots, trails and other heavy-traffic areas.

== See also ==
- Cellular confinement
- Compressed earth block
- Geopolymers
- Sandcrete
