= Biocidal natural building material =

A biocidal natural building material is a natural building material which has biocidal properties. The biocidal properties of biocidal natural building materials are inherent to the material, rather than being supplemented afterwards. This makes that the material is long lasting and inexpensive, as no additional processing needs to be done.

== Examples ==
- core wood soaked with plant saps: e.g. core wood soaked with the biocidal plant saps from Pinus canariensis (natural durability: 150 years)
- several tropical (hard)wood species
- resins and plant juices as latex have (fairly) long durability due to protective proteins
