= Sand reinforced polyester composite =

Building material

Sand reinforced polyester composites (SPCs), are building materials with sand acting as reinforcement in the composite. Early forays into using sand reinforced composites included making sand reinforced composite bricks with polyester resin and hardener to provide emergency relief housing for those affected by the 2010 earthquake in Haiti as well as constructing affordable housing in Namibia. Sand was used in the composites because of its abundance and ease in obtaining.

== Composition ==
The composition of sand is highly variable depending on the origin of the sand. The most common material found in non-tropical, coastal, and inland sand is silica usually in the form of quartz – which is considerably hard and one of the most common minerals resistant to weathering.

== Preparation ==
- Drying sand
- Mixing with alternate material(s)
- Adding a hardener to the mixture (such as methyl ethyl ketone peroxide)
- Pouring mixture into mold and drying
- Releasing from mold and smoothing

== Properties ==
- SPCs decrease water absorption because of the hydrophobic nature of sand.
- The compression strength of SPCs is typically lower than non-sand reinforced composites.
- Flexural strength of SPCs decreases with an increasing weight percent of sand. The composite becomes increasingly brittle as the weight percent of sand increases.
- A greater weight percent of sand increases the composite's hardness (Vickers hardness test) – sand has reinforcing capabilities.
- Thermal conductivity decreases with a greater weight percent of sand. Sand has insulating properties.
