= Building material =

Material which is used for construction purposes

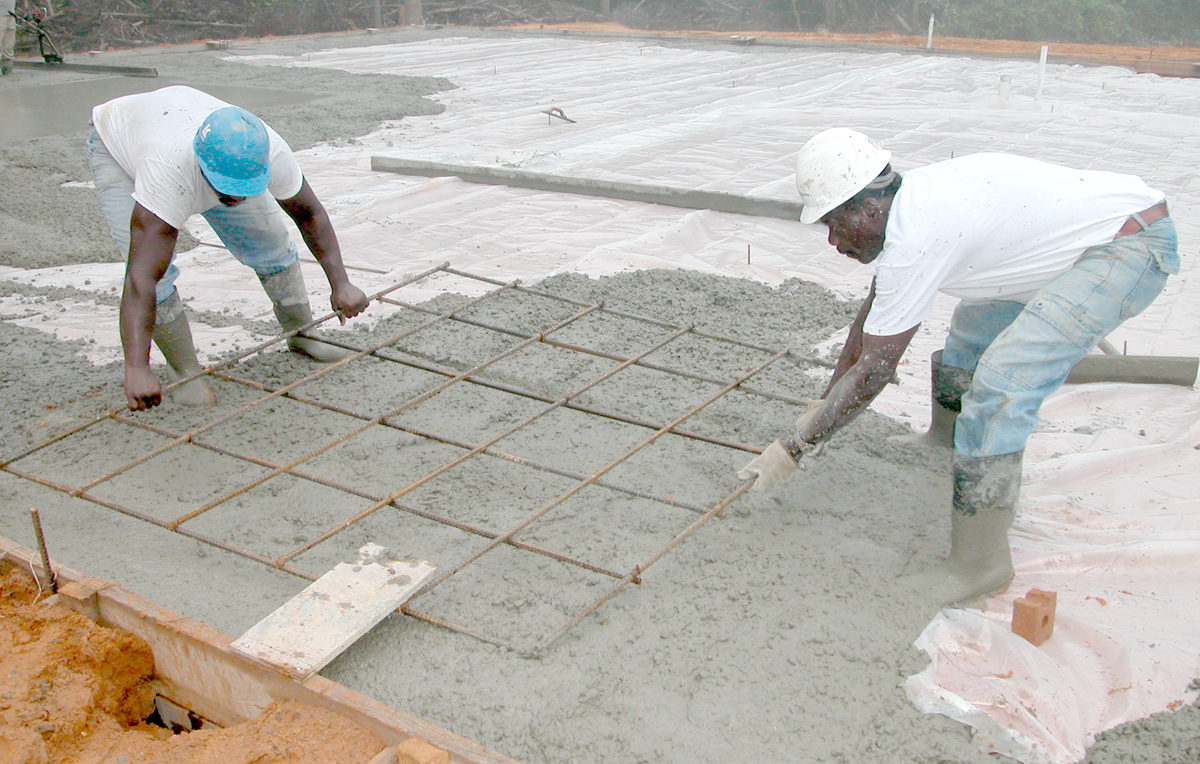
Concrete and steel rebar used to build a reinforced concrete floor

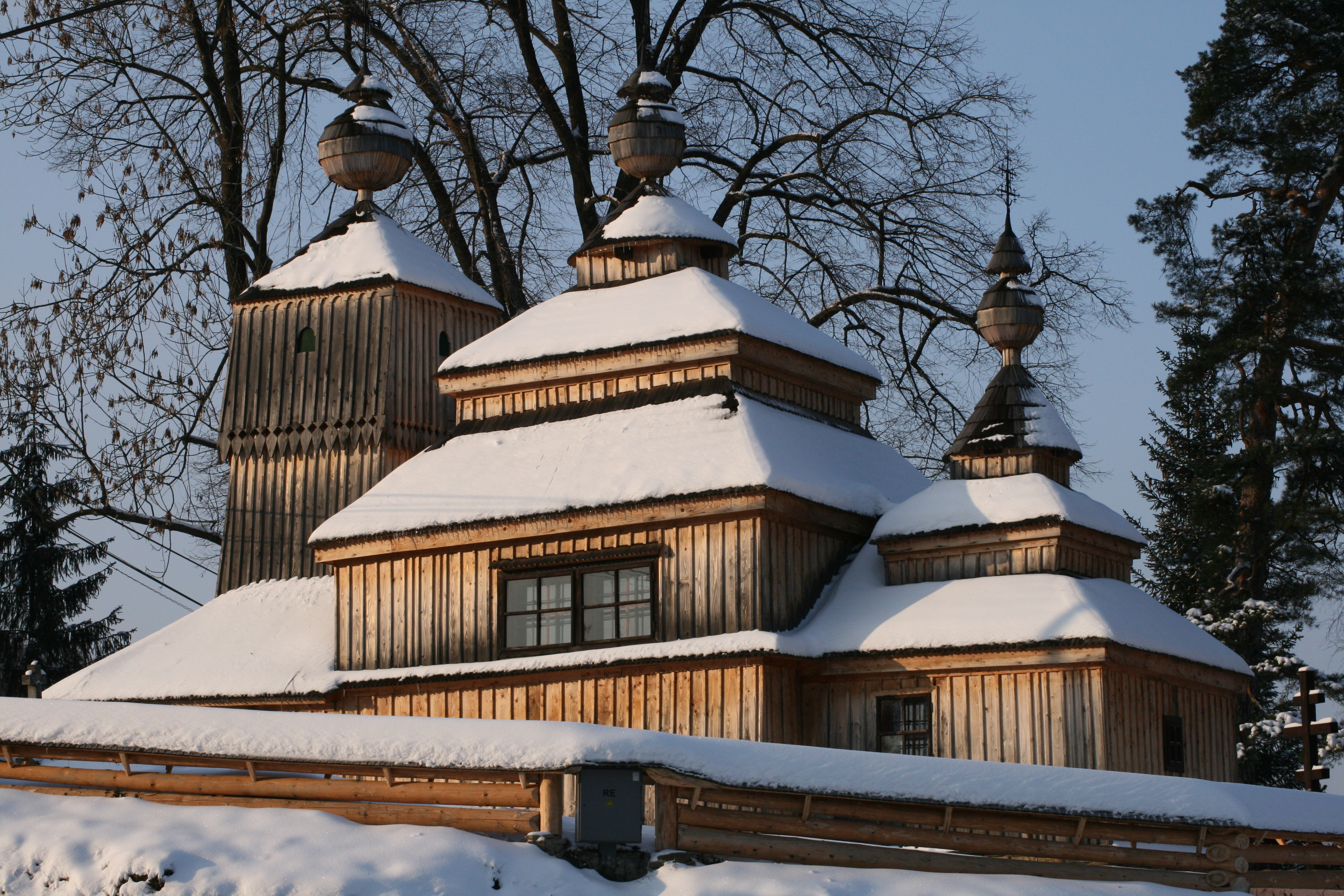
Wooden church in Bodružal in Slovakia

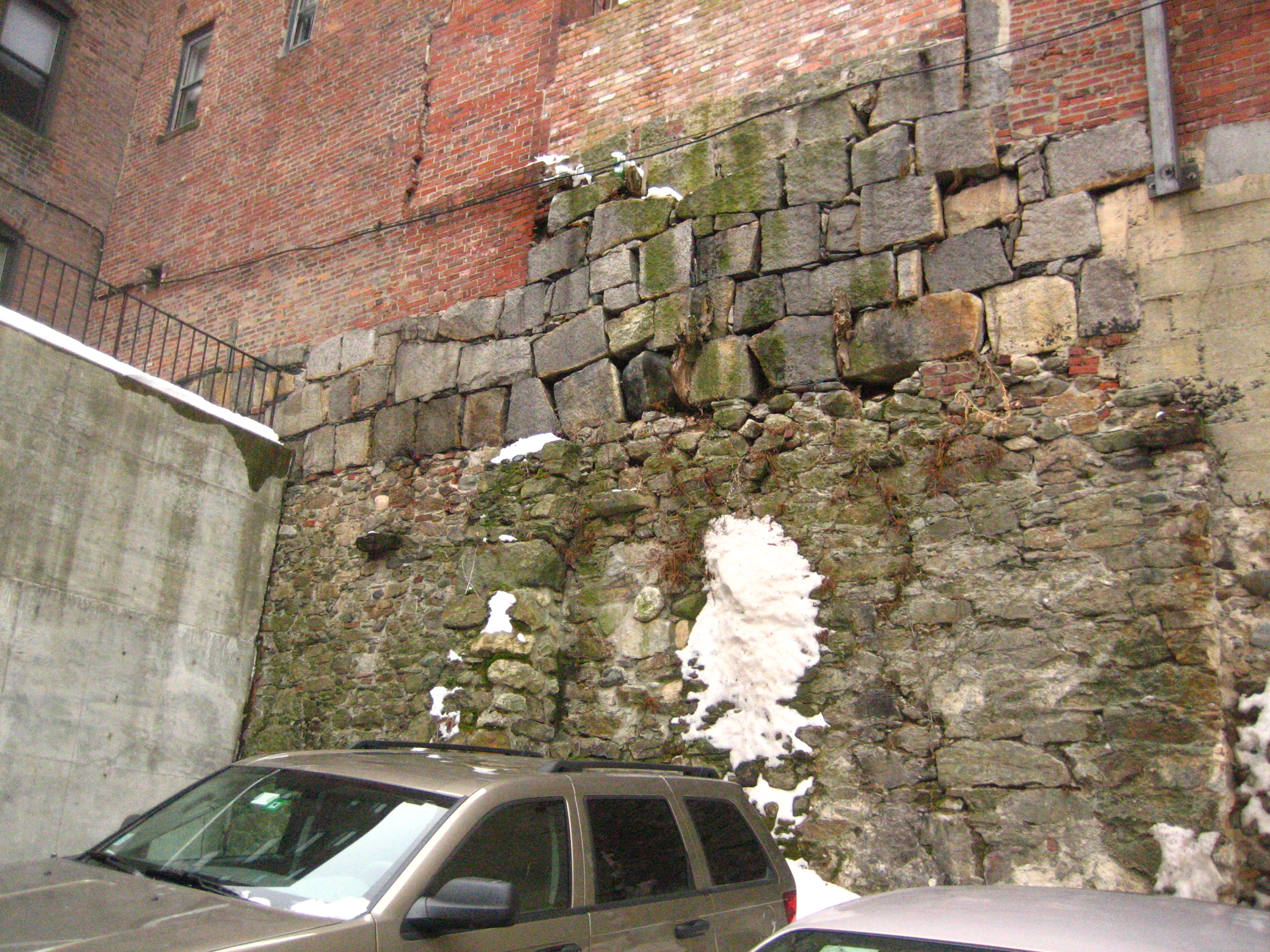
This wall in Beacon Hill, Boston shows different types of brickwork and stone foundations.

Building material is material used for construction. Many naturally occurring substances, such as clay, rocks, sand, wood, and even twigs and leaves, have been used to construct buildings and other structures, like bridges. Apart from naturally occurring materials, many man-made products are in use, some more and some less synthetic. The manufacturing of building materials is an established industry in many countries and the use of these materials is typically segmented into specific specialty trades, such as carpentry, insulation, plumbing, and roofing work. They provide the make-up of habitats and structures including homes.

== The total cost of building materials ==
In history, there are trends in building materials from being natural to becoming more human-made and composite; biodegradable to imperishable; indigenous (local) to being transported globally; repairable to disposable; chosen for increased levels of fire-safety, and improved seismic resistance. These trends tend to increase the initial and long-term economic, ecological, energy, and social costs of building materials.

=== Economic costs ===
The initial economic cost of building materials is the purchase price. This is often what governs decision making about what materials to use. Sometimes people take into consideration the energy savings or durability of the materials and see the value of paying a higher initial cost in return for a lower lifetime cost. For example, an asphalt shingle roof costs less than a metal roof to install, but the metal roof will last longer so the lifetime cost is less per year. Some materials may require more care than others, maintaining costs specific to some materials may also influence the final decision. One risk to consider when estimating lifetime cost of a material is that of the building being damaged by fire or wind during the life of a material, thus negating the value of its remaining life. Another is if the material is not as durable as advertised. It is said that, "if it must be done, it must be done well".

=== Ecological costs ===
Pollution costs can be macro and micro. Macro costs of a building material include associated damage the environment at its source (extraction industries such as mining, petroleum, and logging); in transportation of the raw materials; during manufacturing; in transportation of the finished product; from retailing; and from installation. Micro costs of pollution include the off-gassing of the building materials installed in the building or indoor air pollution. Red List building materials are materials found to be harmful. The carbon footprint refers to total greenhouse gas emissions produced in the life of the material. A life-cycle analysis also includes the reuse, recycling, or disposal of construction waste. Two concepts in building which account for the ecological economics of building materials are green building and sustainable development.

=== Energy costs ===
The initial energy costs include the amount of energy consumed to produce, deliver and install the material. The long-term energy cost is the economic, ecological, and social costs of continuing to produce and deliver energy to the building for its use, maintenance, and eventual removal. The initial embodied energy of a structure is the energy consumed to extract, manufacture, deliver, and install the materials. The lifetime embodied energy continues to grow with the use, maintenance, and reuse/recycling/disposal of the building materials themselves and how the materials and design help minimize the lifetime energy consumption of the structure.

=== Social costs ===
Social costs are injury and health of the people producing and transporting the materials and potential health problems of the building occupants if there are problems with the building biology. Globalization has had significant impacts on people both in terms of jobs, skills, and self-sufficiency lost when manufacturing facilities are closed and the cultural aspects of where new facilities are opened. Aspects of fair trade and labor rights are social costs of global building material manufacturing.

== Naturally occurring substances ==
Bio-based materials (especially plant-based materials) are used in a variety of building applications, including load-bearing, filling, insulating, and plastering materials. These materials vary in structure depending on the formulation used. Plant fibres can be combined with binders and then used in construction to provide thermal, hydric or structural functions. The behaviour of concrete based on plant fibre is mainly governed by the amount of the fibre constituting the material. Several studies have shown that increasing the amount of these plant particles increases porosity, moisture buffering capacity, and maximum absorbed water content on the one side, while decreasing density, thermal conductivity, and compressive strength on the other.

Plant-based materials are largely derived from renewable resources and mainly use co-products from agriculture or the wood industry. When used as insulation materials, most bio-based materials (unlike most other insulation materials) exhibit hygroscopic behaviour, combining high water vapour permeability and moisture regulation.

=== Brush ===
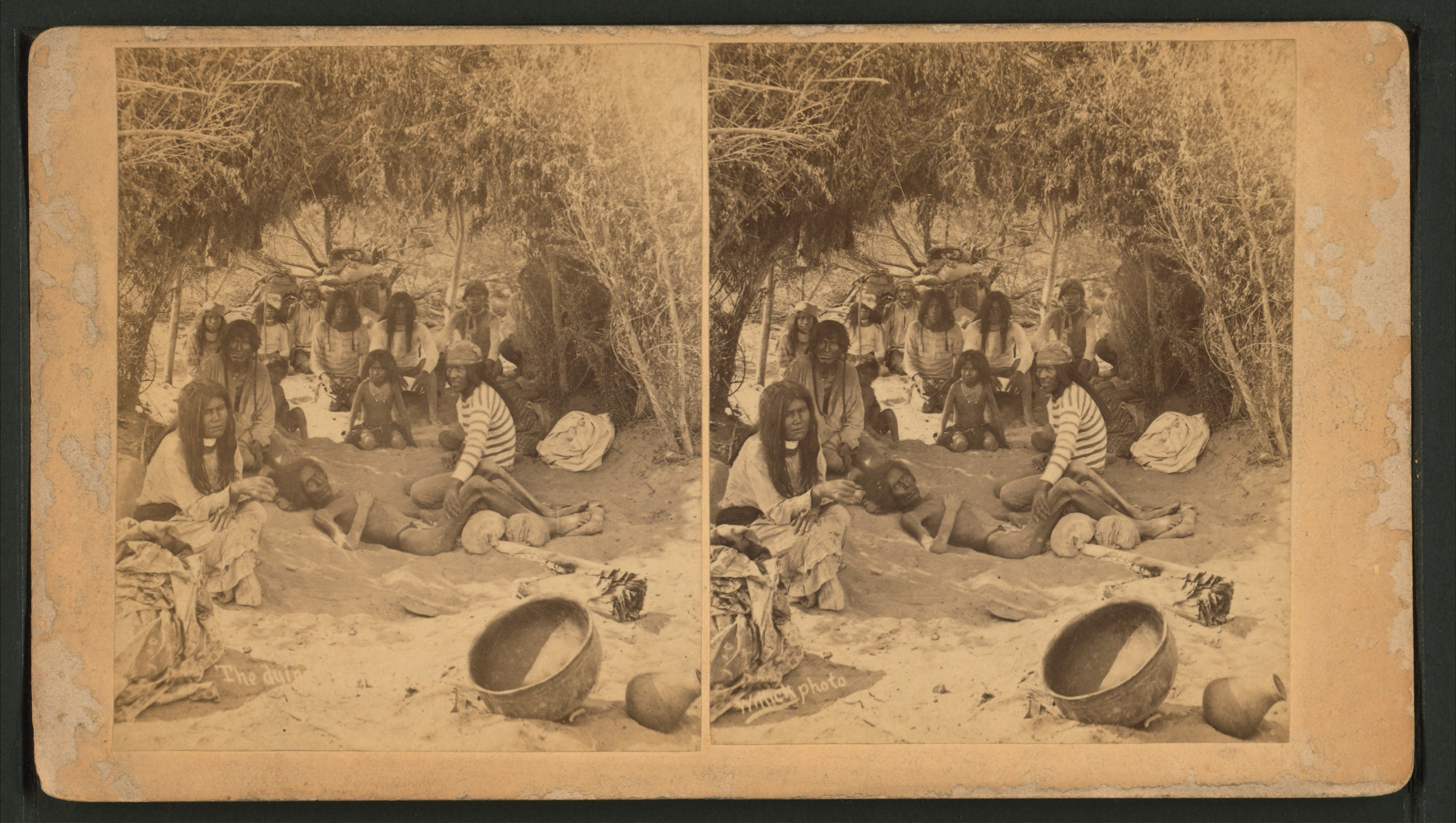
A group of Mohaves in a brush hut

Brush structures are built entirely from plant parts and have been used in various cultures including Native American peoples in the great basin and southwest of North America and pygmy peoples in Africa. These are built mostly with branches, twigs and leaves, and bark, similar to a beaver's lodge. These were variously named wikiups, lean-tos, and so forth.

An extension on the brush building idea is the wattle and daub process in which clay soils or dung, usually cow, are used to fill in and cover a woven brush structure. This gives the structure more thermal mass and strength. Wattle and daub is one of the oldest building techniques. Many older timber frame buildings incorporate wattle and daub as non-load-bearing walls between the timber frames.

=== Ice and snow ===
Snow and occasionally ice have beem used by the Inuit peoples for igloo and quinzhee shelters. Ice has also been used for ice hotels as a tourist attraction in northern climates.

=== Mud and clay ===
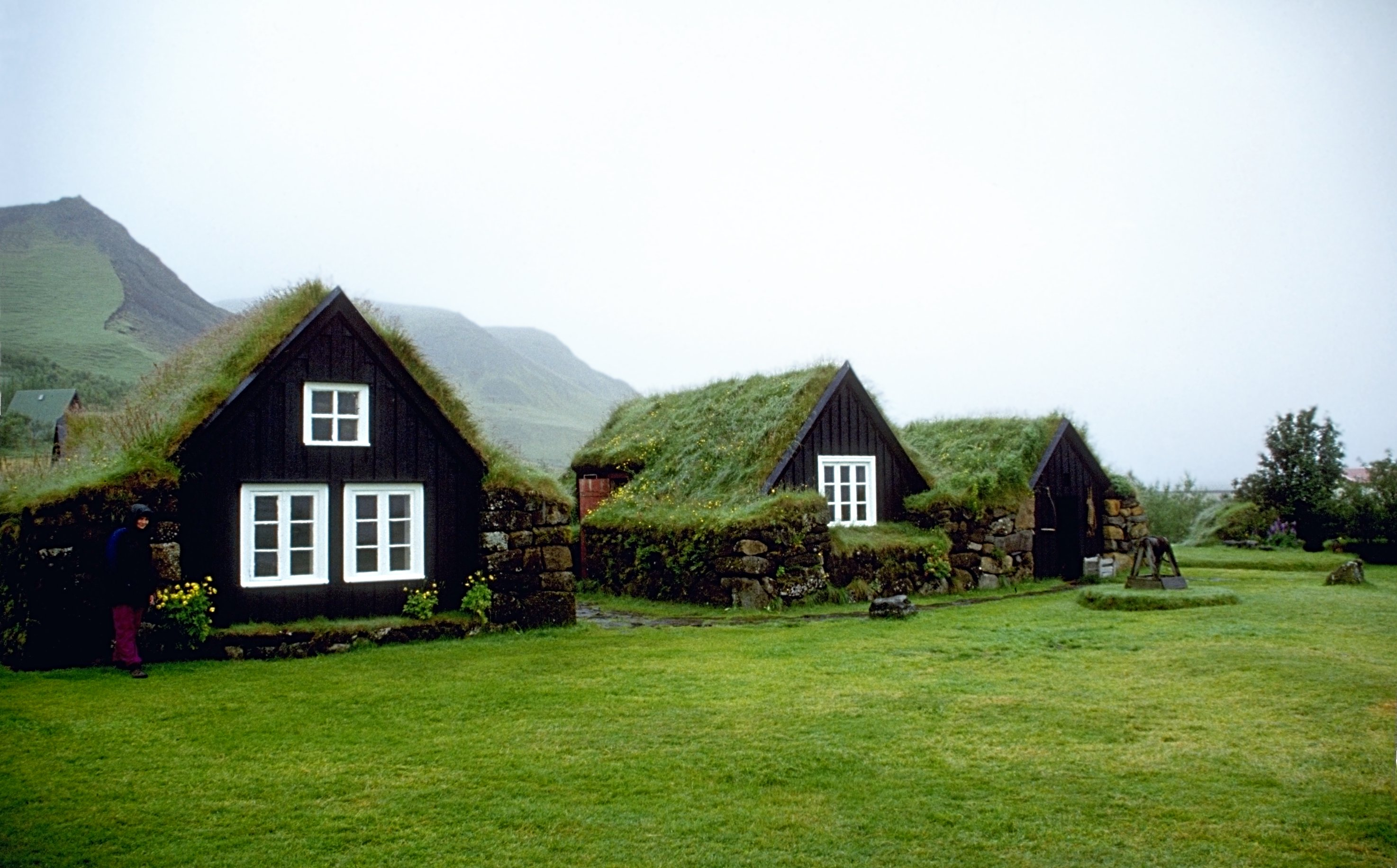
Sod buildings in Iceland

Clay based buildings usually come in two distinct types. One being when the walls are made directly with the mud mixture, and the other being walls built by stacking air-dried building blocks called mud bricks.

Other uses of clay in building is combined with straws to create light clay, wattle and daub, and mud plaster.

==== Wet-laid clay walls ====
Wet-laid, or damp, walls are made by using the mud or clay mixture directly without forming blocks and drying them first. The amount of and type of each material in the mixture used leads to different styles of buildings. The deciding factor is usually connected with the quality of the soil being used. Larger amounts of clay are usually employed in building with cob, while low-clay soil is usually associated with sod house or sod roof construction. The other main ingredients include more or less sand/gravel and straw/grasses. Rammed earth is both an old and newer take on creating walls, once made by compacting clay soils between planks by hand; nowadays forms and mechanical pneumatic compressors are used.

Soil, and especially clay, provides good thermal mass; it is very good at keeping temperatures at a constant level. Homes built with earth tend to be naturally cool in the summer heat and warm in cold weather. Clay holds heat or cold, releasing it over a period of time like stone. Earthen walls change temperature slowly, so artificially raising or lowering the temperature can use more resources than in say a wood built house, but the heat/coolness stays longer.

People have been building homes with mostly dirt and clay, such as cob, sod, and adobe, for centuries around the world and continue to do so, though on a smaller scale. Some of these buildings have remained habitable for hundreds of years.

==== Structural clay blocks and bricks ====
Mud-bricks, also known by their Spanish name adobe, are ancient building materials whose evidence dates back thousands of years. Compressed earth blocks are a more modern type of brick used for building more frequently in industrialized society since the building blocks can be manufactured off site in a centralized location at a brickworks and transported to multiple building locations. These blocks can also be monetized more easily and sold.

Structural mud bricks are almost always made using clay, often clay soil, and a binder; these may be the only ingredients used or other ingredients including sand, lime, concrete, stone can be included as binders. The formed or compressed block is then air dried and can be laid dry or with a mortar or clay slip.

=== Sand ===
Sand is used with cement and sometimes lime to make mortar for masonry work and plaster. Sand is also used as a part of the concrete mix. An important low-cost building material in countries with high sand content soils is the Sandcrete block, which is weaker but cheaper than fired clay bricks. Sand reinforced polyester composite are used as bricks.

=== Stone or rock ===
Rock structures have existed for as long as history can recall. It is the longest-lasting building material available, and is usually readily available. There are many types of rock, with differing attributes that make them better or worse for particular uses. Rock is a very dense material so it gives a lot of protection; its main drawback as a building material is its weight and the difficulty of working it. Its energy density is both an advantage and disadvantage. Stone is hard to warm without consuming considerable energy but, once warm, its thermal mass means that can retain heat for useful periods of time.

Dry-stone walls and huts have been built for as long as humans have put one stone on top of another. Eventually, different forms of mortar were used to hold the stones together, cement being the most commonplace now.

The granite-strewn uplands of Dartmoor National Park, United Kingdom, for example, provided ample resources for early settlers. Circular huts were constructed from loose granite rocks throughout the Neolithic and early Bronze Age, and the remains of an estimated 5,000 can still be seen today. Granite continued to be used throughout the Medieval period (see Dartmoor longhouse) and into modern times. Slate is another stone type, commonly used as roofing material in the United Kingdom and other parts of the world where it is found.

Stone buildings can be seen in most major cities, and some civilizations built predominantly with stone, such as the Egyptian and Aztec pyramids and the structures of the Inca civilization.

=== Thatch ===
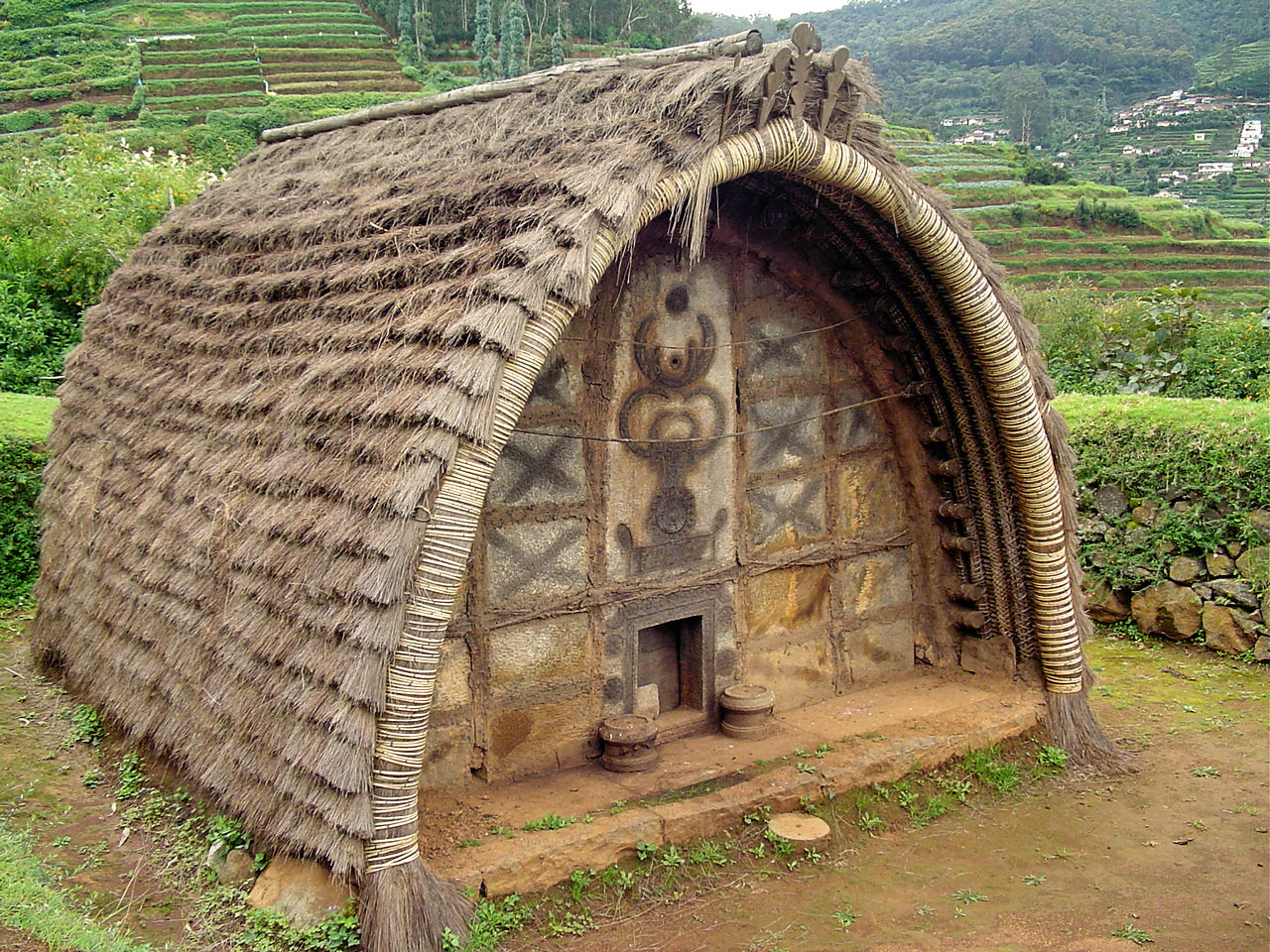
Toda tribe hut

Thatch is one of the oldest of building materials known. "Thatch" is another word for "grass"; grass is a good insulator and easily harvested. Many African tribes have lived in homes made completely of grasses and sand year-round. In Europe, thatch roofs on homes were once prevalent but the material fell out of favor as industrialization and improved transport increased the availability of other materials. Today, though, the practice is undergoing a revival. In the Netherlands, for instance, many new buildings have thatched roofs with special ridge tiles on top.

=== Wood and timber ===
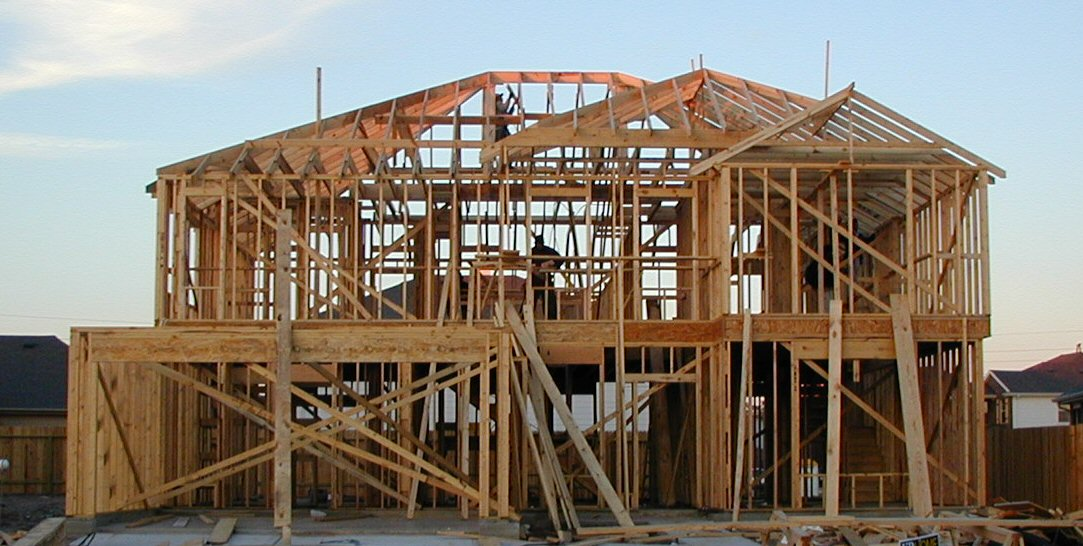
A wood-framed house under construction in Texas, United States

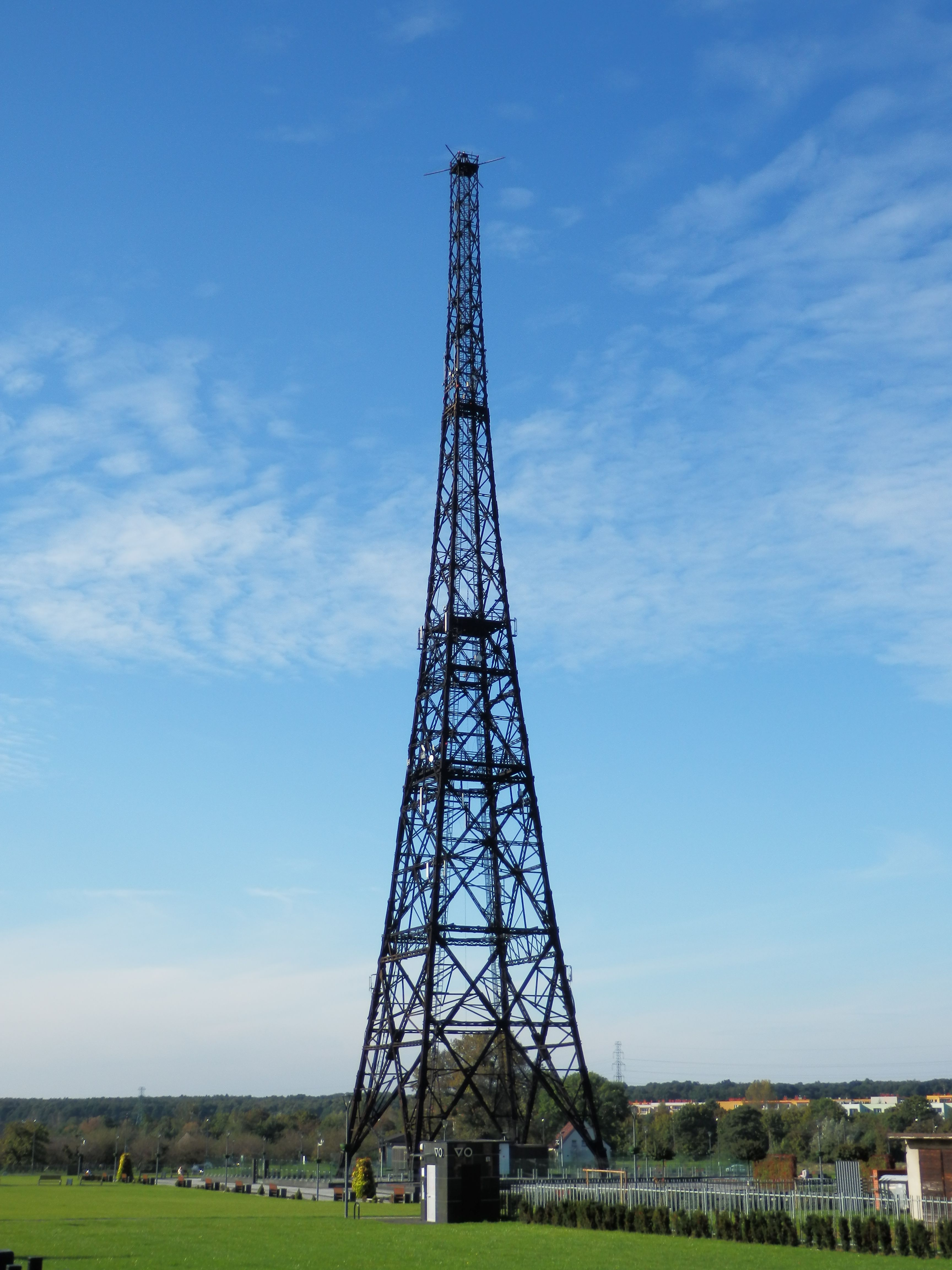
The Gliwice Radio Tower (the second tallest wooden structure in the world) in Poland (2012).

Wood has been used as a building material for thousands of years in its natural state. Today, engineered wood is becoming very common in industrialized countries.

Wood is a product of trees, and sometimes other fibrous plants, used for construction purposes when cut or pressed into lumber and timber, such as boards, planks and similar materials. It is a generic building material and is used in building just about any type of structure in most climates. Wood can be very flexible under loads, keeping strength while bending, and is incredibly strong when compressed vertically. There are many differing qualities to the different types of wood, even among same tree species. This means specific species are better suited for various uses than others, and growing conditions are important for deciding quality.

"Timber" is the term used for construction purposes except the term "lumber" is used in the United States. Raw wood (a log, trunk, bole) becomes timber when the wood has been "converted" (sawn, hewn, split) in the forms of minimally-processed logs stacked on top of each other, timber frame construction, and light-frame construction. The main problems with timber structures are fire risk and moisture-related problems.

In modern times softwood is used as a lower-value bulk material, whereas hardwood is usually used for finishings and furniture. Historically, timber frame structures were predominantly built with oak in western Europe, but recently douglas fir has become the most popular wood for most types of structural building.

Many families or communities in rural areas have a personal woodlot to grow and harvest trees to build with or sell. These lots are tended to like a garden. This was much more prevalent in pre-industrial times, when laws existed as to the amount of wood one could cut at any one time to ensure there would be a supply of timber for the future, but is still a viable form of agriculture.

== Man-made substances ==
=== Fired bricks and clay blocks ===
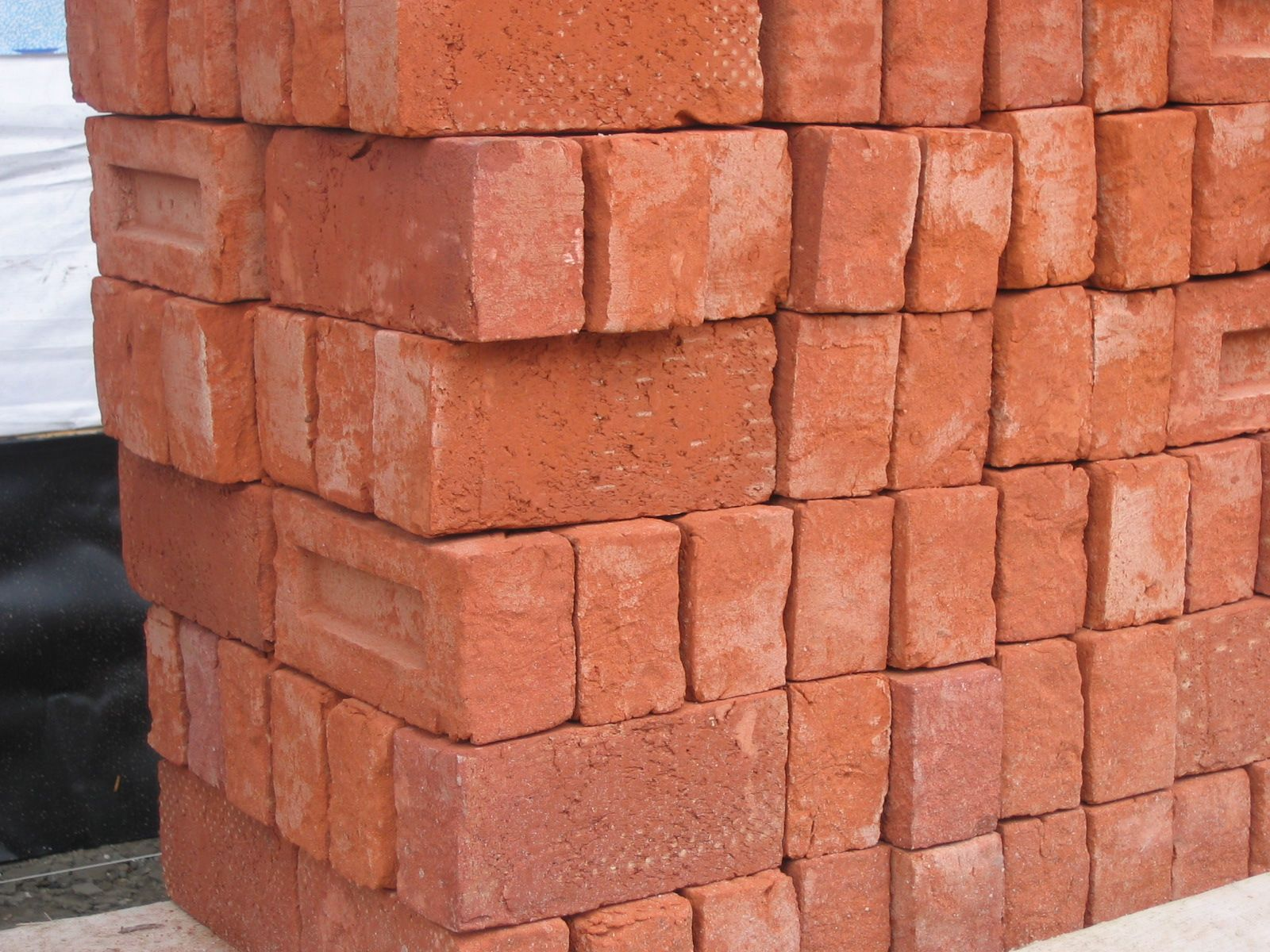
A pile of fired bricks.

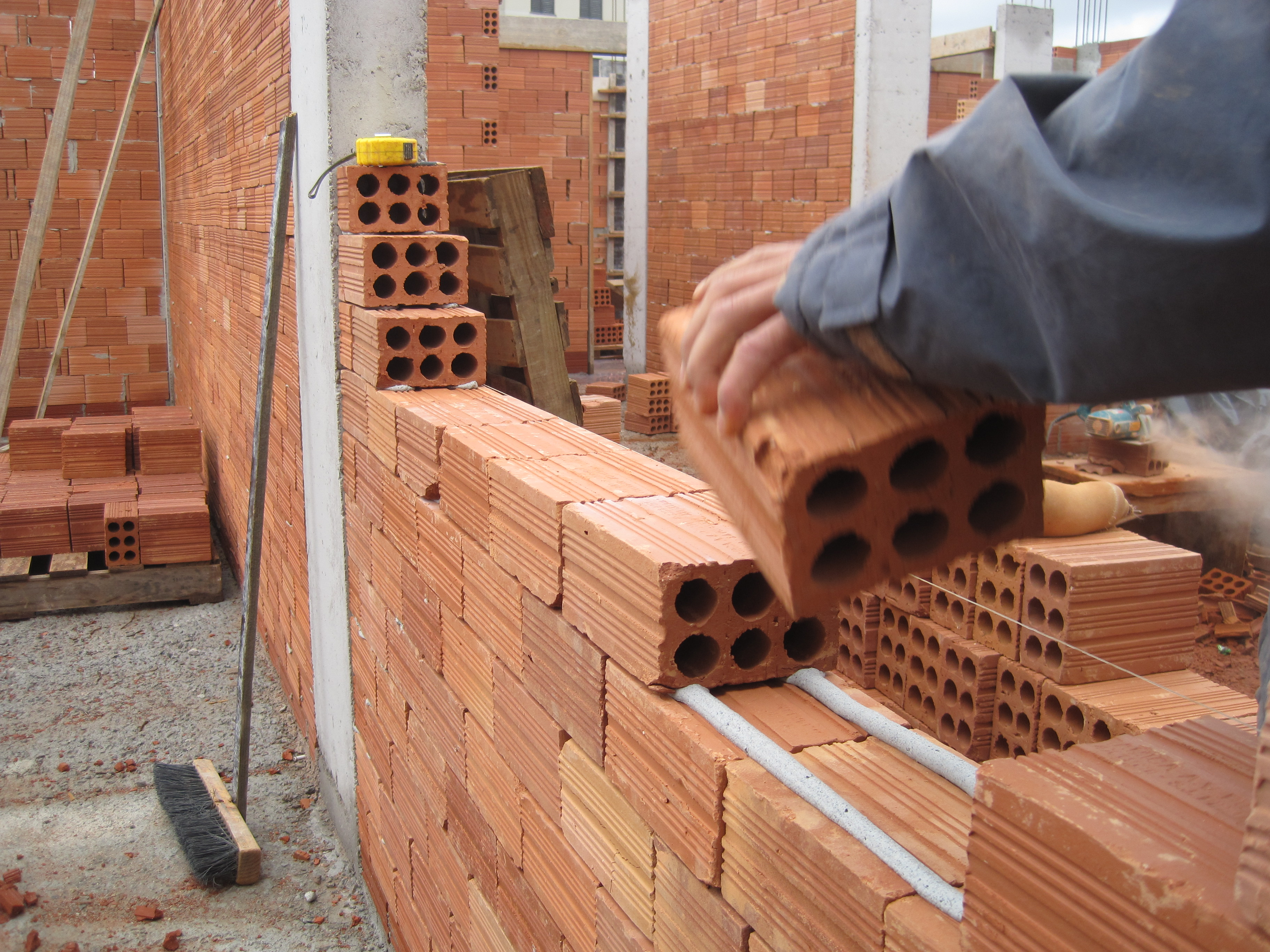
Clay blocks (sometimes called clay block brick) being laid with an adhesive rather than mortar

Bricks are made in a similar way to mud-bricks except without the fibrous binder such as straw and are fired ("burned" in a brick clamp or kiln) after they have air-dried to permanently harden them. Kiln-fired clay bricks are a ceramic material. Fired bricks can be solid or have hollow cavities to aid in drying and make them lighter and easier to transport. The individual bricks are placed upon each other in courses using mortar, with successive courses being used to build up walls, arches, and other architectural elements. Fired brick walls are usually substantially thinner than cob/adobe while keeping the same vertical strength. They require more energy to create but are easier to transport and store, and are lighter than stone blocks. Romans extensively used fired brick of a shape and type now called Roman bricks. Building with brick gained much popularity in the mid-18th and 19th centuries. This was due to lower costs with increases in brick manufacturing and fire-safety in increasingly crowded cities.

The cinder block supplemented or replaced fired bricks in the late 20th century, often being used for the inner parts of masonry walls but also by themselves.

Structural clay tiles (clay blocks) are clay or terracotta and typically are perforated with holes.

=== Cement composites ===
Cement-bonded composites are made of hydrated cement paste that binds wood, particles, or fibers to make pre-cast building components. Various fibrous materials, including paper, fiberglass, and carbon-fiber have been used as binders.

Wood and natural fibers are composed of various soluble organic compounds like carbohydrates, glycosides and phenolics. These compounds are known to retard cement setting. Therefore, before using a wood in making cement-bonded composites, its compatibility with cement needs to be assessed. Wood-cement compatibility is the ratio of a parameter related to the property of a wood-cement composite to that of a neat cement paste. The compatibility is often expressed as a percentage value. To determine wood-cement compatibility, methods based on different properties are used, such as, hydration characteristics, strength, interfacial bond and morphology. Various methods are used by researchers such as the measurement of hydration characteristics of a cement-aggregate mix; the comparison of the mechanical properties of cement-aggregate mixes and the visual assessment of microstructural properties of the wood-cement mixes. It has been found that the hydration test by measuring the change in hydration temperature with time is the most convenient method. Recently, Karade et al. have reviewed these methods of compatibility assessment and suggested a method based on the ‘maturity concept’, i.e. taking in consideration both time and temperature of cement hydration reaction. Recent work on aging of lignocellulosic materials in the cement paste showed hydrolysis of hemicelluloses and lignin that affects the interface between particles or fibers and concrete and causes degradation.

Bricks were laid in lime mortar from the time of the Romans until supplanted by Portland cement mortar in the early 20th century. Cement blocks also sometimes are filled with grout or covered with a parge coat.

=== Concrete ===
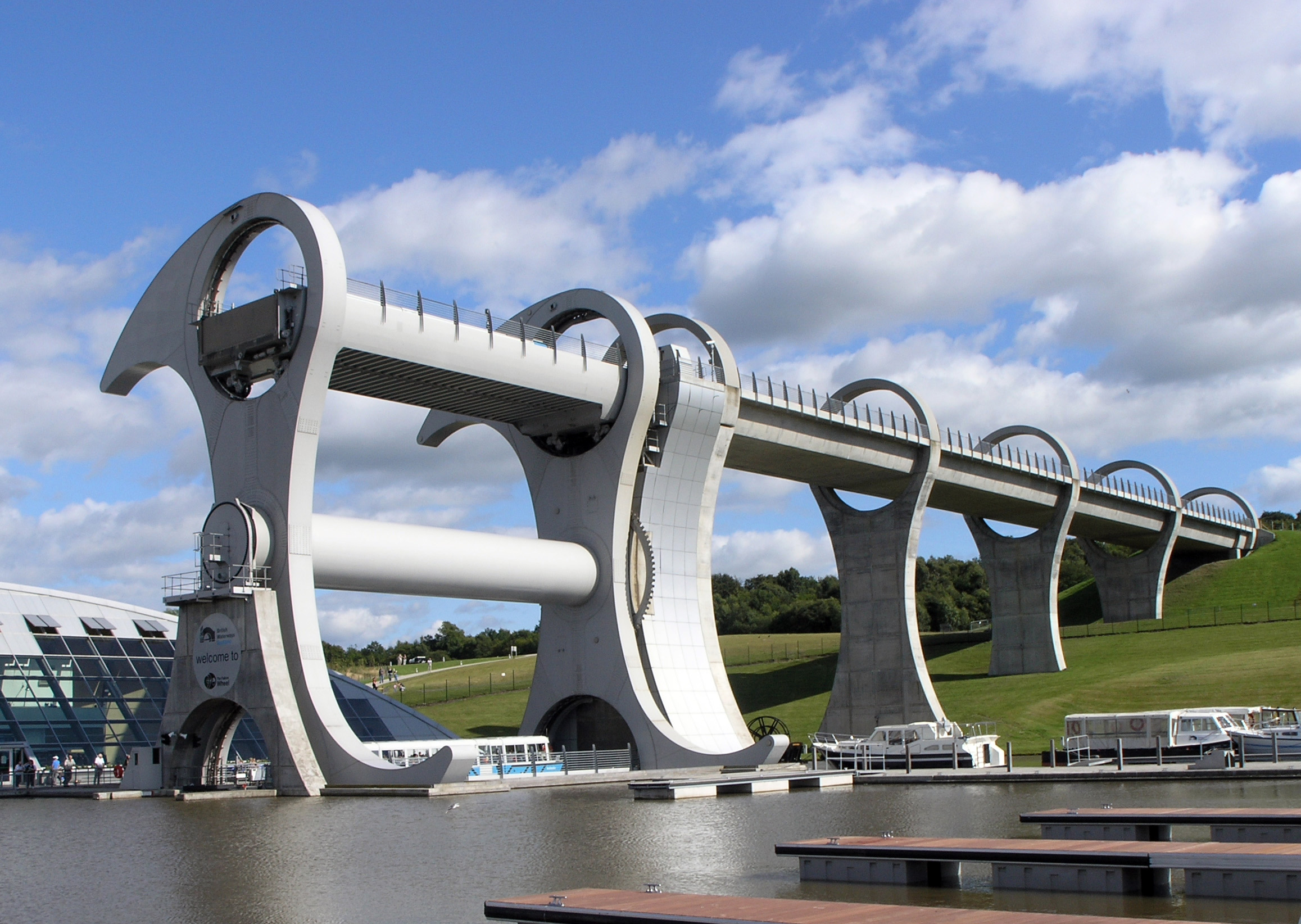
Falkirk Wheel

Concrete is a composite building material made from the combination of aggregate and a binder such as cement. The most common form of concrete is Portland cement concrete, which consists of mineral aggregate (generally gravel and sand), portland cement and water.

After mixing, the cement hydrates and eventually hardens into a stone-like material. When used in the generic sense, this is the material referred to by the term "concrete".

For a concrete construction of any size, as concrete has a rather low tensile strength, it is generally strengthened using steel rods or bars (known as rebars). This strengthened concrete is then referred to as reinforced concrete. In order to minimise any air bubbles that would weaken the structure, a vibrator is used to eliminate any air that has been entrained when the liquid concrete mix is poured around the ironwork. Concrete has been the predominant building material in the modern age due to its longevity, formability, and ease of transport. Recent advancements such as insulating concrete forms combine the concrete forming and other construction steps (installation of insulation). All materials must be taken in required proportions as described in standards.

=== Fabric ===
The tent is the home of choice among nomadic groups all over the world. Two well-known types are the conical teepee and the circular yurt. The tent has been revived as a major construction technique with the development of tensile architecture and synthetic fabrics. Modern buildings can be made of flexible material such as fabric membranes, and supported by a system of steel cables, rigid or internal, or by air pressure.

=== Foam ===
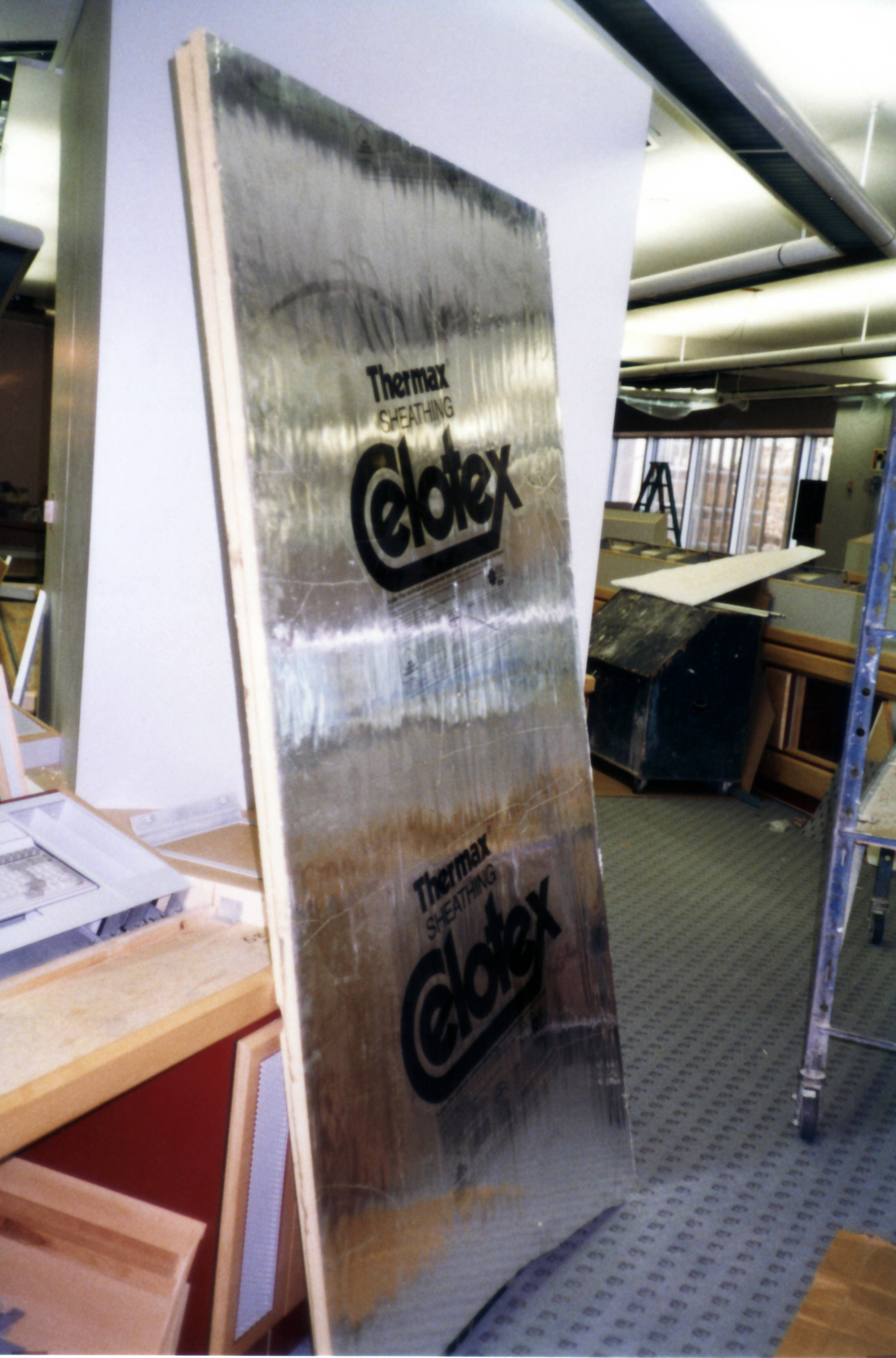
Foamed plastic sheet to be used as backing for firestop mortar at CIBC bank in Toronto.

Recently, synthetic polystyrene or polyurethane foam has been used in combination with structural materials, such as concrete. It is lightweight, easily shaped, and an excellent insulator. Foam is usually used as part of a structural insulated panel, wherein the foam is sandwiched between wood or cement or insulating concrete forms.

=== Glass ===
Glassmaking is considered an art form as well as an industrial process or material.

Clear windows have been used since the invention of glass to cover small openings in a building. Glass panes provided humans with the ability to both let light into rooms while at the same time keeping inclement weather outside.

Glass is generally made from mixtures of sand and silicates, in a very hot fire stove called a kiln, and is very brittle. Additives are often included the mixture used to produce glass with shades of colors or various characteristics (such as bulletproof glass or lightbulbs).

The use of glass in architectural buildings has become very popular in modern culture. Glass "curtain walls" can be used to cover the entire facade of a building, or it can be used to span over a wide roof structure in a "space frame". These uses though require some sort of frame to hold sections of glass together, as glass by itself is too brittle and would require an overly large kiln to be used to span such large areas by itself.

Glass bricks were invented in the early 20th century.

=== Gypsum concrete ===
Gypsum concrete is a mixture of gypsum plaster and fibreglass rovings. Although plaster and fibres fibrous plaster have been used for many years, especially for ceilings, it was not until the early 1990s that serious studies of the strength and qualities of a walling system Rapidwall, using a mixture of gypsum plaster and 300 mm plus fibreglass rovings, were investigated. With an abundance of gypsum (naturally occurring and by-product chemical FGD and phospho gypsums) available worldwide, Gypsum concrete-based building products, which are fully recyclable, offer significant environmental benefits.

=== Metal ===
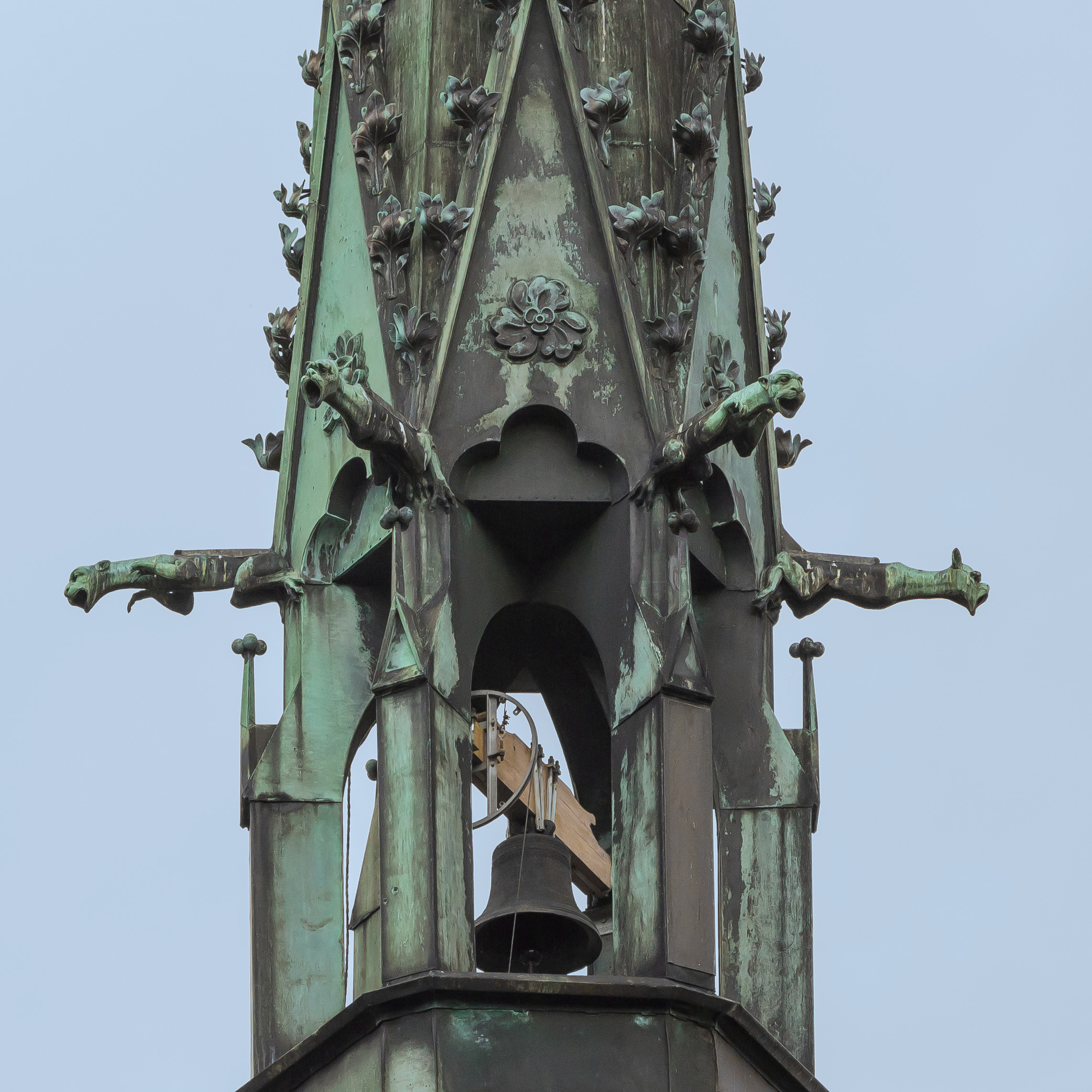
Copper belfry of St. Laurentius church, Bad Neuenahr-Ahrweiler

Metal is used as structural framework for larger buildings such as skyscrapers, or as an external surface covering. There are many types of metals used for building. Metal figures quite prominently in prefabricated structures such as the Quonset hut, and can be seen used in most cosmopolitan cities. It requires a great deal of human labor to produce metal, especially in the large amounts needed for the building industries. Corrosion is metal's prime limitation when it comes to longevity.

- Steel is a metal alloy whose major component is iron, and is the usual choice for metal structural building materials. It is strong, flexible, and if refined well and/or treated lasts a long time.
- The lower density and better corrosion resistance of aluminium alloys and tin sometimes overcome their greater cost.
- Copper is a valued building material because of its advantageous properties (see: Copper in architecture). These include corrosion resistance, durability, low thermal movement, light weight, radio frequency shielding, lightning protection, sustainability, recyclability, and a wide range of finishes. Copper is incorporated into roofing, flashing, gutters, downspouts, domes, spires, vaults, wall cladding, building expansion joints, and indoor design elements.
- Other metals used include chrome, gold, silver, and titanium. Titanium can be used for structural purposes, but it is much more expensive than steel. Chrome, gold, and silver are used as decoration, because these materials are expensive and lack structural qualities such as tensile strength or hardness.

=== Plastics ===
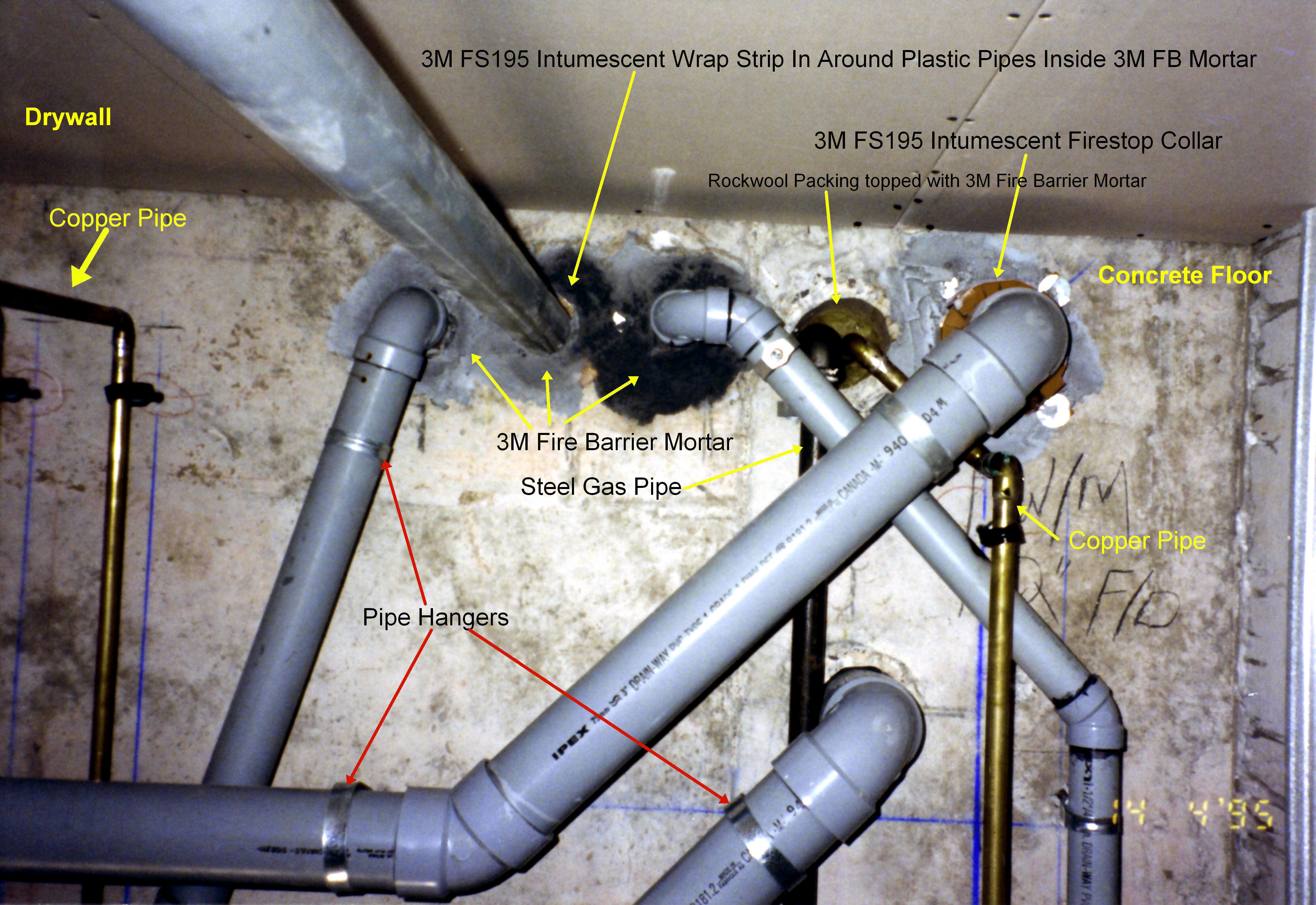
Plastic pipes penetrating a concrete floor in a Canadian highrise apartment building

The term plastics covers a range of synthetic or semi-synthetic organic condensation or polymerization products that can be molded or extruded into objects, films, or fibers. Their name is derived from the fact that in their semi-liquid state they are malleable, or have the property of plasticity. Plastics vary immensely in heat tolerance, hardness, and resiliency. Combined with this adaptability, the general uniformity of composition and lightness of plastics ensures their use in almost all industrial applications today. High performance plastics such as ETFE have become an ideal building material due to its high abrasion resistance and chemical inertness. Notable buildings that feature it include: the Beijing National Aquatics Center and the Eden Project biomes.

Around twenty percent of all plastics and seventy percent of all polyvinyl chloride (PVC) produced in the world each year are used by the construction industry. It is predicted that much more will be produced and used in the future. "In Europe, approximately 20% of all plastics produced are used in the construction sector including different classes of plastics, waste and nanomaterials." There are both direct use (construction materials containing plastics) and indirect use (packaging of construction materials) in different parts of the building processes.

=== Papers and membranes ===
Building papers and membranes are used for many reasons in construction. One of the oldest building papers is red rosin paper which was known to be in use before 1850 and was used as an underlayment in exterior walls, roofs, and floors and for protecting a jobsite during construction. Tar paper was invented late in the 19th century and was used for similar purposes as rosin paper and for gravel roofs. Tar paper has largely fallen out of use supplanted by asphalt felt paper. Felt paper has been supplanted in some uses by synthetic underlayments, particularly in roofing by synthetic underlayments and siding by housewraps.

There are a wide variety of damp proofing and waterproofing membranes used for roofing, basement waterproofing, and geomembranes.

=== Ceramics ===
Fired clay bricks have been used since the time of the Romans. Special tiles are used for roofing, siding, flooring, ceilings, pipes, flue liners, and more.

== Living building materials ==
A relatively new category of building materials, living building materials are materials that are either composed of, or created by a living organism; or materials that behave in a manner that's reminiscent of such. Potential use cases include self-healing materials, and materials that replicate (reproduce) rather than be manufactured.

== Building products ==
In the market place, the term "building products" often refers to ready-made particles or sections made from various materials, that are fitted in architectural hardware and decorative hardware parts of a building. The list of building products excludes the building materials used to construct the building architecture and supporting fixtures, like windows, doors, cabinets, millwork components, etc. Building products, rather, support and make building materials work in a modular fashion.

"Building products" may also refer to items used to put such hardware together, such as caulking, glues, paint, and anything else bought for the purpose of constructing a building.

== Research and development ==
To facilitate and optimize the use of new materials and up-to-date technologies, ongoing research is being undertaken to improve efficiency, productivity and competitiveness in world markets.

Material research and development may be commercial, academical or both, and can be conducted at any scale.

Rapid prototyping allows researchers to develop and test materials quickly, making adjustments and solving issues during the process. Rather than developing materials theoretically and then testing them, only to discover fundamental flaws, rapid prototypes allow for comparatively quick development and testing, shortening the time to market for a new materials to a matter of months, rather than years.

== Sustainability ==
In 2017, buildings and construction together consumed 36% of the final energy produced globally while being responsible for 39% of the global energy-related CO_{2} emissions. The shares from the construction industry alone were 6% and 11% respectively. Energy consumption during building material production is a dominant contributor to the construction industry's overall share, predominantly due to the use of electricity during production. Embodied energy of relevant building materials in the US are provided in the table below.

Material	Embodied energy	
Material	Btu/lb	MJ/kg
bricks	1,600	3.7
cement	3,230	7.5
clay	15,200	35.4
concrete	580	1.3
copper	25,770	59.9
flat glass	10,620	24.7
gypsum	10,380	24.1
hardwood plywood & veneer	15,190	35.3
lime	1,920	4.5
mineral wool insulation	12,600	29.3
primary aluminum	80,170	186.5
softwood plywood & veneer	3,970	9.2
stone	1,430	3.3
virgin steel	10,390	24.2
wood lumber	2,700	6.3

== Testing and certification ==
- ASTM International
- UL (safety organization)
- ETL SEMKO — Building Product Testing Laboratory in the USA, part of Intertek, based in London
- EU Construction Product Regulation

== See also ==
- Alternative natural materials
- Biocidal natural building material
- Glass in green buildings
- Green building and wood
- Greystone
- Hemp as a building material
- Hempcrete
- List of building materials
- Materiality (architecture)
- Natural building
- Phenomenology (architecture)
- Prefabrication
- Thermal emittance
- Thermal mass
