= Compressed earth block =

Building material

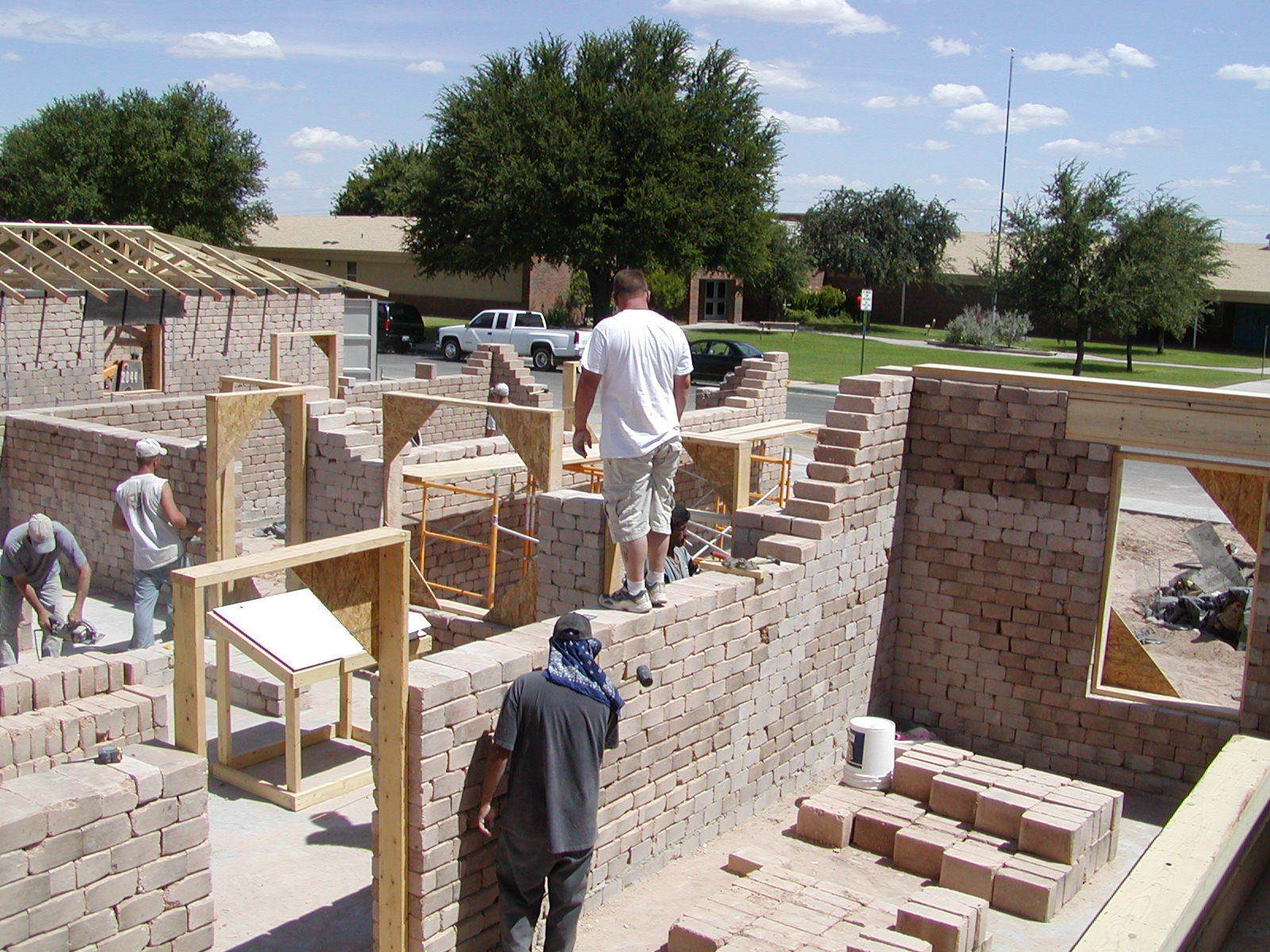
Building a CEB project in Midland, Texas in August 2006

A compressed earth block (CEB), also known as a pressed earth block or a compressed soil block, is a building material made primarily from an appropriate mix of fairly dry inorganic subsoil, non-expansive clay, sand, and aggregate. Forming compressed earth blocks requires dampening, mechanically pressing at high pressure, and then drying the resulting material. If the blocks are stabilized with a chemical binder such as Portland cement they are called compressed stabilized earth block (CSEB) or stabilized earth block (SEB). Typically, around 3,000 psi (21 MPa) of pressure is applied in compression, and the original material volume is reduced by about half.

Creating CEBs differs from rammed earth in that the latter uses a larger formwork into which earth is poured and manually tamped down, creating larger forms such as a whole wall or more at one time, rather than building blocks. CEBs differ from mud bricks in that the latter are not compressed, but solidify through chemical changes that take place as they air dry. The compression strength of properly made CEB usually exceeds that of typical mud brick. Building standards have been developed for CEB.

CEBs are assembled onto walls using standard bricklaying and masonry techniques. The mortar may be a simple slurry made of the same soil/clay mix without aggregate, spread or brushed very thinly between the blocks for bonding, or cement mortar may also be used for high strength, or when construction during freeze-thaw cycles causes stability issues. Hydraform blocks are shaped to be interlocking.

== Development ==
CEB technology has been developed for low-cost construction, as an alternative to adobe, and with some advantages. A commercial industry has been advanced by eco-friendly contractors, manufacturers of the mechanical presses, and by cultural acceptance of the method. In the United States, most general contractors building with CEB are in the Southwestern states: New Mexico, Colorado, Arizona, California, and to a lesser extent in Texas. The methods and presses have been used for many years in Mexico, and in developing countries.

The South African Department of Water Affairs and Forestry considers that CEB, locally called "Dutch brick", is an appropriate technology for a developing country, as are adobe, rammed earth and cob. All use natural building materials. In 2002 the International Institute for Energy Conservation was one of the winners of a World Bank Development Marketplace Award for a project to make an energy-efficient Dutch brick-making machine for home construction in South Africa. By making cheaper bricks that use earth, the project would reduce housing costs while stimulating the building industry. The machine would be mobile, allowing bricks to be made locally from earth.

An abnormal result of a compressive strength of 45 MPa (6,500 psi) was obtained in one sample. Strengths might exceed the ASTM standard for concrete blocks (1,900 pounds per square inch (13,000 kPa)) in some instances. In India, the observed compressive strength and flexural strength of CSEB at 28 days of aging with 9% cement stabilization has been observed to be 3.2 MPa (464 psi) and 1 MPa (145 psi) respectively. With 7% cement and sandy soil 3-4 MPa (435 - 580 psi) compressive strength has resulted.

The Mexican social enterprise Échale has provided 250,000 housing units, of which 30,000 are new homes, in 28 Mexican states. Échale used CSEB, which it called "Ecoblock", to construct walls. Earth blocks tend to lose strength and dimensional stability when coming in contact with water for a long period of time. In some cases, it may lead to the complete disintegration of the block.

The mixture of the interlocking blocks must be consistent and just moist enough. If the mixture is too dry, it will collapse after hydraulic pressing; but if the mixture has too much water, it cannot solidify. Workforce trained to produce and construct interlocking blocks is limited.
