= Cost estimate =

Estimation of the cost of a project

A cost estimate is the approximation of the cost of a program, project, or operation. The cost estimate is the product of the cost estimating process. The cost estimate has a single total value and may have identifiable component values.

The U.S. Government Accountability Office (GAO) defines a cost estimate as "the summation of individual cost elements, using established methods and valid data, to estimate the future costs of a program, based on what is known today".

The American Association of Cost Engineering (AACEI) defines a cost estimate as the prediction of the probable costs of a project or effort, for a given and documented scope, a defined location, and point of time in the future (February 2021).

Potential cost overruns can be avoided with a credible, reliable, and accurate cost estimate.

== Overview ==
The GAO reports that "realistic cost estimating was imperative when making wise decisions in acquiring new systems". A cost estimate is often needed to support evaluations of project feasibility or funding requirements in support of planning. A cost estimate is often used to establish a budget as the cost constraint for a project or operation.

In project management, project cost management is a major functional division. Cost estimating is one of three activities performed in project cost management.

In cost engineering, cost estimation is a basic activity. A cost engineering reference book has chapters on capital investment cost estimation and operating cost estimation. The fixed capital investment provides the physical facilities. The working capital investment is a revolving fund to keep the facilities operating.

In system, product, or facility acquisition planning, a cost estimate is used to evaluate the required funding and to compare with bids or tenders.

In construction contracting, a cost estimate is usually prepared to submit a bid or tender to compete for a contract award.

In facility maintenance and operation, cost estimates are used to establish funding or budgets.

In manufacturing, costing plays a crucial role in cost estimation by identifying and calculating the expenses for materials, labor, and overhead required to produce a product.

In pricing and cost discovery negotiations, a "should cost" model is a documented calculation undertaken by a potential customer or their negotiator through which they understand the costs facing the supplier and are equipped to investigate or challenge proposed prices put forward by a supplier's cost estimator. The Society of Cost Engineers argues that the process of "should costing", with its intention to challenge or "stretch" a supplier's cost proposals, is different from an internal cost estimation process. A number of well-established should-cost solution providers actively maintain cost data used to model costing.

In an attempt to manage liability risk, some firms avoid the use of the word estimate and instead refer to the estimate as an "Opinion of Probable Cost".

== Cost estimate types ==
Various projects and operations have distinct types of cost estimating, which vary in their composition and preparation methods. Some of the major areas include:

- Construction cost (i) detailed construction estimate (ii) abstract construction estimate
- Manufacturing cost
- Total delivery cost
- Software development cost
- Aerospace mission cost
- Resource exploration cost
- Facility operation cost
- Facility maintenance and repair cost
- Facility rehabilitation and renewal cost
- Facility retirement cost

== Cost estimate classifications ==
Common cost estimate classifications historically used are

- Order of magnitude
- Preliminary
- Definitive

These correspond to modern published classes 5, 3, and 1, respectively. The U.S. Department of Energy and many others use a system of five classes of estimates:

Estimate class	Name	Purpose	Project definition level
Class 5	Order of magnitude	Screening or feasibility	0% to 2%
Class 4	Intermediate	Concept study or feasibility	1% to 15%
Class 3	Preliminary	Budget, authorization, or control	10% to 40%
Class 2	Substantive	Control or bid/tender	30% to 70%
Class 1	Definitive	Check estimate or bid/tender	50% to 100%

Methods used to prepare the estimates range from stochastic or judgment at early definition to deterministic at later definition. Some estimates use mixed methods.

Cost estimate classifications have been published by ASTM and AACE International. The American Society of Professional Estimators (ASPE) defines estimate levels in the reverse order as Level 1 – Order (Range) of Magnitude, Level 2 – Schematic/Conceptual Design, Level 3- Design Development, Level 4 – Construction Document, and Level 5 – Bid. The Association of Cost Engineers (ACostE) defines a Class I Estimate as definitive, a Class II Estimate as semi-detailed, and a Class III Estimate as pre-budget.

Other names for estimates of different classes include:

Class 1	Class 3	Class 5
Detailed estimate	Semi-detailed estimate	Conceptual estimate
Final estimate	Scope estimate	Pre-design estimate
Control estimate	Sanction estimate	Preliminary estimate
As-bid estimate		Pre-budget estimate
As-sold estimate		Evaluation estimate
CD estimate	DD estimate	SD estimate
		Parametric estimate
		Rough order-of-magnitude (ROM) estimate
		Very rough order-of-magnitude (VROM) estimate
		SWAG (scientific, wild-ass guess) estimate
		PIDOOMA (pulled-it-directly out-of-my-[thin Air]) estimate

== Estimate quality ==
Estimate quality refers to the delineation of quality requirements for the estimate. These requirements are set out in accordance with official quality assurance standards. There may also be other expectations for the estimate which are not specific requirements, but may affect the perceived quality of the estimate. Published quality requirements generally have to do with credibility, accuracy, confidence level, precision, risk, reliability, and validity of the estimate, as well as thoroughness, uniformity, consistency, verification, and documentation.

“The result of bidding without good estimates is certain: jobs that end up with less profit, no profit, or a loss. The bidder ultimately will go out of business; the only question is how long will it take.”

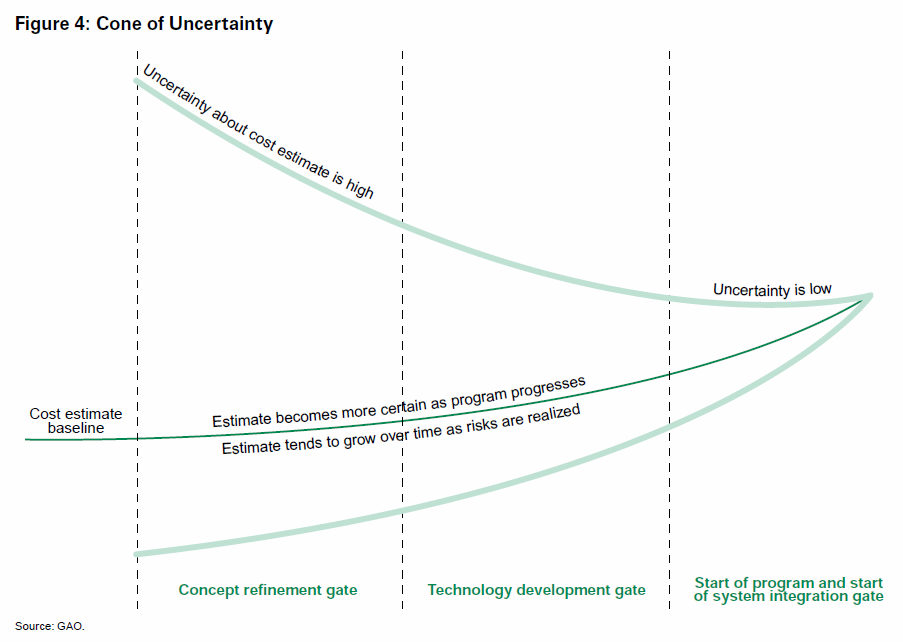

Since a cost estimate is the approximation of the cost of a project or operation, then estimate accuracy is a measure of how closely the estimate is able to predict the actual expenditures for the project or operation. This can only be known after the project is completed. If, for example, a project estimate was $1,252,000 for a specific scope and conditions, and at completion the records showed that $1,172,451.26 was expended, the estimate was 6.8% too high. If the project ended up having a different scope or conditions, an unadjusted computation does not fairly assess the estimate accuracy. Predictions of the estimate accuracy may accompany the estimate. Typically this is expressed as a range higher or lower as compared with the point estimate with an expected probability that the actual cost will fall in the range. An example for a definitive estimate might be that the estimate has a -5/+10% range of accuracy with a 90% confidence that the final value will fall in that range. The accuracy of an early estimate relates to the estimate quality. Factors affecting the quality of the estimate include the people who prepared the estimate, how the estimate was prepared, and what was known about the project. For the same project, the range of uncertainty about the total estimate decreases over time, as illustrated in the cone of uncertainty diagram.

High-quality cost estimates are developed through a structured process that includes defining scope, identifying ground rules, collecting data, and analyzing risk. Thorough documentation—commonly referred to as the Basis of Estimate (BOE)—is key for transparency and traceability. Supporting documents may include quantity takeoffs, methodology, vendor quotes, and cost assumptions. Additional insights into industry practices are discussed in various estimation resources.

Although the pursuit of cost estimate accuracy should always be encouraged, a study in 2002 found that the estimates used to determine whether important infrastructure should be built were "highly and systematically misleading".

== Contingency ==
A contingency may be included in an estimate to provide for unknown costs which from experience are indicated as likely to occur, but are not identifiable. When using an estimate which has no contingency to set a budget or to set aside funding, a contingency is often added to increase the probability that the budget or funding will be adequate to complete the project. The estimate or budget contingency is not intended to compensate for poor estimate quality, and is not intended to fund design growth, owner changes, or anything else unrelated to delivering the scope as defined in the estimate documentation. Generally, more contingency is needed for earlier estimates due to the higher uncertainty of estimate accuracy.

== Cost estimating methods and best practices ==
Estimating methods may vary by type and class of estimate. The method used for most definitive estimates is to fully define and understand the scope, take off or quantify the scope, and apply costing to the scope, which can then be summed to a total cost. Proper documentation and review are also important. Pricing transforms the cost estimate into what the firm wishes to charge for the scope. Early estimates may employ various means of cost modeling. The basic characteristics of effective estimating include: clear identification of task, broad participation in preparing estimates, availability of valid data, standardized structure for the estimate, provision for program uncertainties, recognition of inflation, recognition of excluded costs, independent review of estimates, and revision of estimates for significant program changes. Application of best practices helps ensure a high-quality estimate. “Certain best practices should be followed if accurate and credible cost estimates are to be developed. These best practices represent an overall process of established, repeatable methods that result in high-quality cost estimates that are comprehensive and accurate and that can be easily and clearly traced, replicated, and updated.”

Tools that may be part of costs estimation are cost indexes. These factors promote time adjustment of capital costs, following changes in technology, availability of materials and labor, and inflation. Due to the inherent unavailability of up-to-date Chemical Process Engineering cost literature, several inflation or cost indexes are available.

=== Construction cost estimates ===
Estimates for the cost of facility construction are a major part of the cost estimate domain. A construction general contractor or subcontractor must normally prepare definitive cost estimates to prepare bids in the construction bidding process to compete for award of the contract. Although many estimators participate in the bidding and procurement processes, those are not a necessary function of cost estimate preparation. Earlier estimates are prepared by differing methods by estimators and others to support the planning process and to compare with bids. Accurate cost estimation is crucial in the early phases of a construction project, as it helps contractors assess feasibility, allocate resources effectively, and ensure that the project stays on budget. Many builders and contractors turn to construction estimating services to support the bidding and planning stages of a project. One way to make those estimates is by determining the resources needed (e.g., the amount of construction material quantities that are required) and then multiplying the estimated construction material quantities by the corresponding unit cost. One advantage of making estimates in this way is that it allows for the segregation of quantities and costs. This way they can be updated separately as new information becomes available. They can also be tracked separately allowing decision makers to make better decisions about the project during its conceptual phase.

==== Definitive Estimates (Class 1) ====
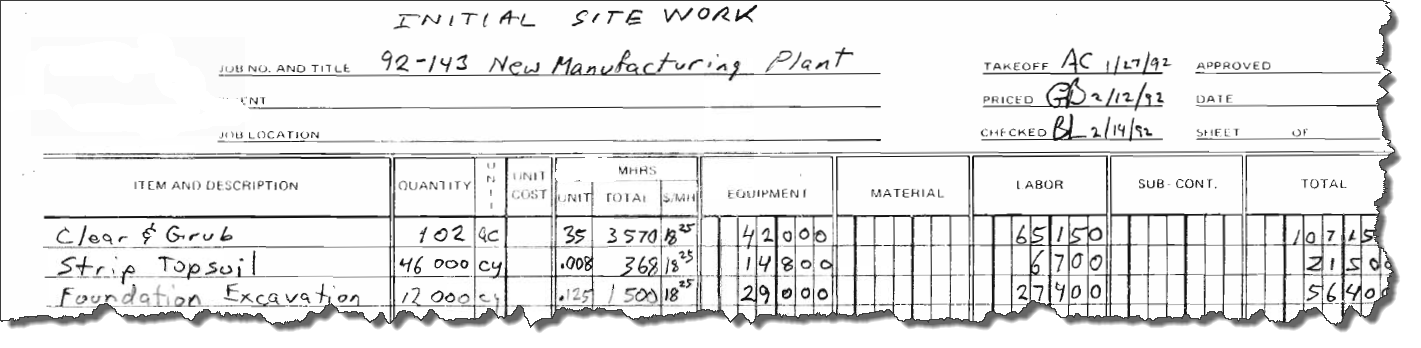
A handwritten spreadsheet.

A definitive estimate is prepared from fully designed plans and specifications (or nearly so), preferably what are called contract documents (CD). The contract documents also establish the Scope of Work (SOW). The standard method is to review and understand the design package and take off (or perform a quantity survey of) the project scope by itemizing it into line items with measured quantities. RSMeans refers to this as, "Scope out the project," and, "Quantify." Some jurisdictions or areas of practice define the itemization and measuring in certain terms, such as RICS and may have specific rules for development of a bill of quantities. The ASPE proposes a best practice standard method for the quantity survey. This includes using the Construction Specifications Institute Uniform Numbering System (MasterFormat) to ensure that all work is accounted for.

Then costs are applied to the quantified line items. This may be called costing or pricing. In estimating for contracting, the cost is what something costs you to build, and price is what you charge another party for building it. RSMeans refers to this as, "Price the quantities." ASPE recommends the "quantity times material and labor costs format" for the compilation of the estimate. This format is illustrated in the handwritten spreadsheet sample. For labor, the estimator should, "Determine basic production rates and multiply them by the units of work to determine total hours for the work." and then multiply the hours by the per hour average labor cost. Labor burdens, material costs, construction equipment costs, and, if applicable, subcontractor costs are also extended on the estimate detail form. Other costs and pricing are added, such as overhead, profit, sales or use taxes, payment and performance bonds, escalation, and contingency.

The costs which are applied to the line-item quantities may come from a cost book (either internal or external) or cost database. For construction contractors or construction managers it is important to track and compile past data of trends, completed projects, production factors, equipment changes, and various labor markets.

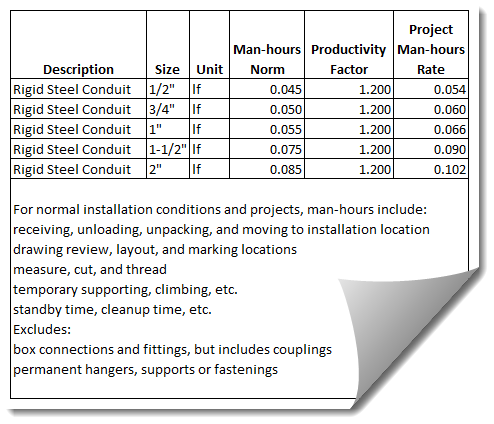
Sample labor norms

The labor requirements are often the most variable and are a primary focus of construction cost estimators. The labor hours required to construct each installation item are calculated by using a man-hour rate times the take-off quantity (a similar method is to divide the take-off quantity by the production rate). Many estimators use a man-hour norm reference for standard man-hours and apply an adjustment factor for project or task conditions, location, methods, equipment, labor skill, etc. to adjust for the anticipated effect on labor.

Direct costs are itemized for all necessary parts of the project. Direct costs are all of the costs which can be attributed directly to the project. Direct costs include costs for general requirements (Division 1 of MasterFormat), which includes such items as project management and coordination, quality control, temporary facilities and controls, cleaning and waste management. Direct costs may also include the costs of project planning, investigation, studies, and design; land or right of way acquisition, and other non-construction costs. Usually, a subtotal of total direct costs is provided in the estimate.

Provisions are made for Indirect costs in addition to the direct costs. Indirect costs include overhead, profit, sales or use taxes, payment and performance bonds, escalation, and contingency. Profit is cost to the buyer, but is not a cost to the provider, rather a projection of anticipated income.

A well documented cost estimate includes a Basis of Estimate (BOE), which describes the scope basis, pricing basis, methods, assumptions, inclusions, and exclusions.

==== Order-of-Magnitude Estimates (Class 5) ====
An order-of-magnitude estimate is prepared when little or no design information is available for the project. It is called order of magnitude because that may be all that can be determined at an early stage. In other words, perhaps we can only determine that it is of a 10,000,000 magnitude as opposed to a 1,000,000 magnitude. Various techniques are employed for these estimates, including experience and judgment, historical values and charts, rules of thumb, and simple mathematical calculations. Factor estimating is one of the more popular methods. This involves taking the known cost of a similar facility and factoring the cost for size, place, and time. Cost modeling is another common technique. In cost modeling the estimator models the various parameters of the facility and applies costs to the derived scope.

Building estimators or architects may use the Uniformat system of breaking down the building into functional systems or assemblies during the schematic design (SD) phase of planning and design. The RSMeans Square Foot Costs book organizes building costs according to the 7 divisions of the UNIFORMAT II classification system. The 7 divisions are:

- A Substructure
- B Shell
- C Interiors
- D Services
- E Equipment & Furnishings
- F Special Construction
- G Building Site Work

== Roles ==
A cost estimator is the professional who prepares cost estimates. There are different types of cost estimators, whose title may be preceded by a modifier, such as building estimator, or electrical estimator, or chief estimator. Other professionals such as quantity surveyors and cost engineers may also prepare cost estimates or contribute to cost estimates. In the US, according to the Bureau of Labor Statistics, there were 185,400 cost estimators in 2010. There are around 53,000 professional quantity surveyors working in the UK.

== Legislation ==
In the United States, Federal Acquisition Regulation 48 CFR § 36.203 requires the preparation of an independent government cost estimate (IGCE or GE) for construction projects. IGCE's can be used in several ways, as they can focus on project cost, life-cycle cost, total cost of ownership or discrete aspects of a programme such as for costing an option.

== See also ==
Lists

- Glossary of construction cost estimating
- Glossary of project management
- Outline of project management
- MasterFormat
- Uniformat

Related fields

- Construction bidding
- Construction estimating software
- Construction management
- Cost database
- Cost engineering
- Chemical plant cost indexes
- Industrial engineering
- Pre-construction services
- Project management
- Software project management
- Total cost management

Professional organizations

- AACE International
- American Society of Professional Estimators
- Construction Management Association of America
- Construction Specifications Institute
- Project Management Institute
- Royal Institution of Chartered Surveyors
