= Glossary of construction cost estimating =

The following is a glossary of terms relating to construction cost estimating.

== A ==
- Allocation of costs is the transfer of costs from one cost item to one or more other cost items.
- Allowance - a value in an estimate to cover the cost of known but not yet fully defined work.
- As-sold estimate - the estimate which matches the agreed items and price for the project scope.

== B ==
- Basis of estimate (BOE) - a document which describes the scope basis, pricing basis, methods, qualifications, assumptions, inclusions, and exclusions.
- Bill of materials (BOM) - a list of materials required for the construction of a project or part of a project, which may include quantities.
- Bill of quantities (BOQ) - a document used in tendering in the construction industry in which materials, parts, and labor (and their costs) are itemized. It also (ideally) details the terms and conditions of the construction or repair contract and itemises all work to enable a contractor to price the work for which he or she is bidding.
- Bond - usually refers to a performance bond, which is a surety bond issued by an insurance company or a bank to guarantee satisfactory completion of a project by a contractor. Other types of guarantees, such as a bid bond or a materials bond, are sometimes also required by a project owner.

== C ==
- Chart of accounts (Code of accounts) (COA) - a created list of the accounts used by a business entity to define each class of items for which money or the equivalent is spent or received. It is used to organize the finances of the entity and to segregate expenditures, revenue, assets and liabilities in order to give interested parties a better understanding of the financial health of the entity.
- City cost index - see: Location cost index. RSMeans publishes a city cost index table.
- Construction is a process that consists of the creation, modification, or demolition of facilities, buildings, civil and monumental works, and infrastructure.
- Construction cost - the total cost to construct a project. This value usually does not include the preplanning, site or right of way acquisition, or design costs, and may not include start-up and commissioning costs. This total or subtotal is usually identified as such in an estimate report. Also known as Total Estimated Contract Cost (TECC).
- Consumables are goods that, according to the 1913 edition of Webster's Dictionary, are capable of being consumed; that may be destroyed, dissipated, wasted, or spent (also known as consumable goods, nondurable goods, or soft goods). In construction, these may include such materials as weld rod, fasteners, tape, glue, etc.
- Contingency - When estimating the cost for a project, product or other item or investment, there is always uncertainty as to the precise content of all items in the estimate, how work will be performed, what work conditions will be like when the project is executed and so on. These uncertainties are risks to the project. Some refer to these risks as "known-unknowns" because the estimator is aware of them, and based on past experience, can even estimate their probable costs. The estimated costs of the known-unknowns is referred to by cost estimators as cost contingency.
- Cost - the value of currency required to obtain a product or service, to expend labor and use equipment and tools, or to operate a business.
- Cost index (or factor) - a value used to adjust the cost of from one time to another. There are various published cost indexes, listed by year, quarter, or month. RSMeans publishes a historical cost index.
- Costing - the process of applying appropriate costs to the line items after the take off. RSMeans refers to this as "Price the quantities." May also be called pricing.
- Crew – a group of people (workers) who execute a construction activity. The crew may also include construction equipment required to execute the work.
- Crew hour (ch) – one crew's effort for one hour of time.

== D ==
- Deliverable is a term used in project management to describe a tangible or intangible object produced as a result of the project that is intended to be delivered to a customer (either internal or external).
- Direct costs are directly attributable to the cost object. In construction, the costs of materials, labor, equipment, etc., and all directly involved efforts or expenses for the cost object are direct costs.
- Distributables – a classification of project costs which are not associated with any specific direct account.
- Duration – the amount of clock or calendar time which is required to execute a work activity or task.

== E ==
- Effort - the work done in accomplishing a task or project. May be a measurement of the hours required.
- Equipment - (1) a category of cost for organizing and summarizing costs, (2) construction equipment used to execute the project work, (3) engineered equipment such as pumps or tanks.
- Escalation is defined as changes in the cost or price of specific goods or services in a given economy over a period. In estimates, escalation is an allowance to provide for the anticipated escalation of costs during construction.
- Estimation in project management is the processes of making cost estimates using the appropriate techniques.

== F ==
- Facility - an installation, contrivance, or other thing which facilitates something; a place for doing something. A building, plant, road, reservoir, etc.
- Field Supervision (or field non-manual) - supervisory personnel and all other non-manual staff at the construction site.
- Foreman - the worker or tradesman who is in charge of a construction crew. The foreman may be a hands-on worker who contributes to the work completion or a non-working foreman. A general foreman may be in charge of all or some crews.
- Fringe Benefits - labor cost elements which are provided to pay for benefits received by workers, such as health insurance, pension, training, etc.

== G ==
- General & Administrative Costs (G&A) - the costs of operating a construction business. These costs include such things as office space, office staff, operating facilities, etc. They are not associated with any specific project, but may be allocated across projects in a cost estimate. See also Overhead, Indirect cost.
- General contractor is responsible for the day-to-day oversight of a construction site, management of vendors and trades, and communication of information to involved parties throughout the course of a building project.
- General requirements - costs for general requirements (Division 1) of the project execution which are actually part of the deliverable. Examples: project management & coordination 47, temporary facilities & controls, cleaning & waste management, commissioning.

== I ==
- Indirect costs are costs that are not directly accountable to a cost object (such as a particular project, facility, function or product). See also, Overhead, General & Administrative Cost, Distributable.

== L ==
- Labor – a category of cost which is incurred to employ people (workers, crafts, trades, etc.) in the execution of construction work activity.
- Labor benefits are additional costs (such as holiday pay or health insurance) which the employer pays directly to the employee or into a fund on behalf of the employee.
- Labor burden is the cost of payroll taxes and insurances (such as workers' compensation) which the employer must pay to employ workers.
- Labor rate (sometimes price) – the amount of currency per unit of time which is required to employ people (workers, crafts, trades, etc.) in the execution of construction work activity. The rate may represent the wage rate only, or may include various benefits and labor burdens.
- Line item - one element of cost in an estimate which is listed in the estimate spreadsheet.
- Location cost index (or factor) - the ratio of the cost in one location to that in another location. These may include or exclude currency exchange rates. Example: 223 in Boston / 187 in Austin = 1.19. The location cost factor is used to adjust the cost from one location to another. To adjust a known cost in Austin to that in Boston, multiply the Austin cost by 1.19. See also City cost index.
- Lump sum – "the complete in-place cost of a system, a subsystem, a particular item, or an entire project."

== M ==
- Man-hour (mh) – one person's (worker, craftsman, tradesman, etc.) effort for one hour of time. Note: some attempt to make this gender neutral by renaming this as work hour or job hour or person hour, or something similar.
- Man-hour norms - a set of standard man-hour rates for work tasks, given normal working conditions.
- Man-hour rate – the amount of man-hours which are consumed executing one unit of work activity. Man-hour rate = man-hours required for work / completed work quantity. Example: Excavation 0.125 mh/cy. The man-hour rate is related to the inverse of the production rate times the number of workers in the crew performing the work. Example: Excavation at 8 cy/day (8-hour day) with 2-man crew = 2 x 8 / 8 = 2 man-hours/cy. See also Production rate. Note: some sources call this Productivity, an unnecessary confusion.
- Mark-up is the difference between the cost of a good or service and its selling price. A markup is added on to the total cost incurred by the producer of a good or service in order to create a profit.
- Manual labor is physical work done by people involved in construction the project. All of the various trade workers are included in manual labor, including foremen.
- Means & methods - the means and methods used in executing the work.

== N ==
- Non-manual labor - work done by people who are not classified as manual labor.
- Non-productive time - work time which is paid but does not contribute to the production of work. Examples: safety meeting, travel time, clean up time, wash up time, etc.

== O ==
- Open shop is a place of employment at which one is not required to join or financially support a union (closed shop) as a condition of hiring or continued employment. Open shop is also known as a merit shop.
- Overhead - In business, overhead or overhead expense refers to an ongoing expense of operating a business; it is also known as an "operating expense". See also General & Administrative Cost, Indirect Cost.
- Overtime is the amount of time someone works beyond normal working hours: see also Premium pay.

== P ==
- Per diem - a daily allowance for expenses, a specific amount of money that an organization gives an individual per day to cover living and traveling expenses (allowance) in connection with work done away from home or on tour. (Latin for "per day" or "for each day")
- Plug number - a value inserted in an estimate as a place holder and an approximation of the cost for a scope element which has not been detailed yet. See also Allowance.
- Premium pay - the extra portion of wages paid when a worker works overtime. Example: Wage rate is 10.00/hour, overtime is paid at time and a half, or 15.00/hour, the premium pay is 5.00/hour.
- Price is the quantity of payment or compensation given by one party to another in return for goods or services.
- Pricing is the function of determining the amount of money asked in consideration for undertaking the project. Depending on the market and profit considerations, etc., the price may be more or less than the cost.
- Production rate – the quantity of work which is completed in one unit of time. Production rate = completed work quantity / duration. Example: Excavation 8 cy/day = 1 cy/hour (in an 8-hour day). RSMeans lists this as Daily Output. See also Man-hour rate. Note: some sources use the term productivity for the production rate or man-hour rate, an unnecessary confusion.
- Productivity is the term which relates one rate to another rate, given two differing sets of conditions for the same work. A production rate greater than the reference production rate indicates a higher productivity. A production rate less than the reference production rate indicates a lower productivity. A man-hour rate greater than the reference man-hour rate indicates a lower productivity. A man-hour rate less than the reference man-hour rate indicates a higher productivity. (The economic concept of productivity is an average measure of the efficiency of production. Productivity is a ratio of production output to what is required to produce it (inputs).)
- Productivity factor – the ratio of a selected production rate to a reference production rate. Example: selected rate = 102, reference rate = 80, productivity factor = 102/80 = 1.28. Alternatively – the ratio of a reference man-hour rate to a selected man-hour rate. Example: selected rate = 0.104, reference rate = 0.125, productivity factor = 0.125/0.104 = 1.20. A productivity factor is often used to adjust a set of standard or normal (norm) production or man-hour rates to a set of rates for a specific project, location, or set of working conditions (see Labor Productivity Factor). Example: Specific type of excavation – standard = 150 cy/day. For specific project, location, or conditions the productivity factor is 0.80. The resulting production rate for that is 150 x 0.8 = 120 cy/day. The actual productivity factor for a project or subset of production rates (or man-hour rates) is the ratio of the actual production rate to the estimated production rate.
- Profit - in accounting, is the difference between revenue and cost. In estimates, it is an allowance to provide for anticipated profit upon completion of the project.
- Profit margin refers to a measure of profitability. It is calculated by finding the net profit as a percentage of the revenue.
- Project - A temporary endeavor undertaken to create a unique product, service, or result.

== Q ==
- Quality can mean a high degree of excellence ("a quality product") or a degree of excellence or the lack of it ("work of average quality").
- Quantify - see: Take off
- Quantity is a property that can exist as a magnitude or multitude. For example 1200 mm or 10 each.
- Quantity surveyor (QS) is a professional working within the construction industry concerned with building costs, in the U.K. and some other areas. A QS employs standard methods of measurement to develop a bill of quantities.

== R ==
- Resources are what is required to carry out a project's tasks. They can be people, equipment, facilities, materials, tools, supplies, or anything else capable of definition required for the completion of a project activity.
- (RFI) Request For Information - A form of documentation sent to a customer requesting answers to questions about your bid. A "request for information" (RFI) is an important part of clarifying plans, designs and specifications during construction.

== S ==
- Schedule of values is a detailed statement furnished by a construction contractor, builder or others outlining the portions of the contract sum. It allocates values for the various parts of the work and is also used as the basis for submitting and reviewing progress payments.
- Scope of a project in project management is the sum total of all of its products and their requirements or features.
- Specification - an explicit set of requirements to be satisfied by a material, product, or service.
- Subcontractor is an individual or in many cases a business that signs a contract to perform part or all of the obligations of another's contract.
- Supplier - A distributor or other company which supplies materials, parts, equipment, etc.

== T ==
- Take off -The process of reviewing and understanding the design package and using the project scope drawings and documents to itemize the scope into line items with measured quantities. RSMeans refers to this as "Scope out the project," and "Quantify".
- Task - a distinct piece of work to be performed.
- Tool - any physical item that can be used to achieve a goal, especially if the item is not consumed in the process.

== U ==
- Unit cost - the cost for one measured unit of completed work activity.
- Unit of measure - the term used for how a bid item is quantified.

== V ==
- Virtual Design and Construction (VDC) is the use of integrated multi-disciplinary performance models of design-construction projects, including the Product (i.e., facilities), Work Processes and Organization of the design - construction - operation team in order to support explicit and public business objectives. In VDC (BIM is one method) the modeling consists of the usual three dimensions, plus the time dimension and the cost dimension.

== W ==
- Work (1) is the amount of effort applied to produce a deliverable or to accomplish a task, (2) is everything required or supplied to complete a construction project.
- Work breakdown structure (WBS) - a deliverable oriented decomposition of a project into smaller components. It defines and groups a project's discrete work elements in a way that helps organize and define the total work scope of the project.
- Worker - a person engaged in the accomplishment of work. In cost estimating, the hands-on workers contribute to the production and are counted in calculations of the production rate. Other workers supervise or support the hands-on work in some way.
- Wage rate - The agreed monetary compensation per hour for a person to accomplish work. This is the pay provided to the worker, excluding any fringe benefits or other labor burdens. Labor unions typically have negotiated agreements which define the wage rates for workers, as well as the rates for fringe benefits.
