= Operational bill =

Tendering document for estimating costs prepared by architects

Operational bills are a tendering document for estimating costs prepared by architects that describes a construction project in terms of the operations (which include labour and plant) needed to build it. This form of document contrasts with that of bills of quantities in which such tendering and estimation is limited to the materials in the completed work. Operational bills have the advantages of enhancing communication between design and production, enabling realistic tender pricing, and making the preparation of critical-path analysis easy for the contractor.

Operational bills were proposed and developed by Edward Skoyles at Building Research Establishment in the 1960s. Priced-activity schedules of the New Engineering Contract are a modern related form, prepared by the contractor.

== Creation ==
An operation is defined as a piece of construction work which can be carried out by a gang of operatives without interruption from another gang. A procedure diagram is provided that shows the relationship of operations to each other and so which are done in sequence and which are done in parallel. This allows a critical-path analysis to be quickly created by the contractor. There are two sections: the first deals with site operations in terms of schedules of materials, labour and plant requirements, and the second, any work prefabricated adjacent or off site. At the end of the bill, management and plant resources are given so they are included.

== History ==
After operational bills were proposed, a second half-way house version with bills of quantities was suggested initially called "activity bills", but then as "Bills of quantities (operations)". In this, the operations are described in terms of the rules of the standard method of measurement rather than labour and materials. A further development was the use of the principles of operational bills in the priced-activity schedules of the New Engineering Contract.

== Advantages and disadvantages ==
=== Advantages ===
- Separates the costs of labour, materials and plant thus enabling cost control.
- Increases the accuracy of estimating.
- Costs can be related to factors that directly determine them such as overall plant usage.
- Allows the reuse of information created in estimating for project management.
- Enables better estimation of variation in works.

=== Disadvantages ===
- Bulky and costly to produce so increasing the work of the contractor’s estimators.
- Radically changes the estimating process.
- Does not fit in with current contracts in regard to work variation.
- It needs computers to allow rapid manipulation of the data: this did not exist when it was originally proposed.
- The design team responsible for creating the operational bill need not be "very familiar with the buildability issues as they affect the construction process".

== See also ==
- Bill of materials
- Bill of quantities
- Construction bidding
- Design-bid-build tender phase
