= Vendor bid analysis =

Vendor Bid Analysis (Vendor analysis) is a technique used to figure out the cost of a project by comparing the bids submitted by many suppliers. This can be accomplished by considering the costs (via quotes, bids, proposals, etc.) presented for project work. By using a selection criteria divided into categories, vendor proposals have to meet these criteria or may be eliminated.

== Evaluating Bids ==
While analyzing the bids of a product or service, the buying side may consider the following:

- Records from previous deals
- Meeting with quality needs
- Seller capacity and resources
- Meeting deadlines in records
- Financial capability

== Bid Analysis ==
Modern vendor bid analysis may utilise software tools and data-driven analytical techniques to organise, compare, and evaluate supplier proposals. These systems can assist in the extraction and classification of bid information, standardise responses across vendors, and support procurement professionals in assessing pricing, compliance, and supplier capabilities.

Machine learning methods have also been applied to supplier evaluation and supplier selection processes, supporting more structured procurement decision-making.Anomaly detection techniques have been used in procurement datasets to identify irregularities and improve oversight of procurement processes.

== See also ==
- Construction bidding
- Design–bid–build
- Cost estimate
