= Edward Skoyles =

British civil servant (1923–2008)

Edward Skoyles (14 March 1923 – 30 July 2008) was the first quantity surveyor employed in the UK to research costs and practices in the construction industry. He did his research from 1960 until 1984 at the Building Research Establishment. Among his research projects was developing a new type of tendering for construction projects called operational bills. He also started the study of the actual amount of waste in the construction industry, and investigated the varying methods of cost estimation practices used in different countries. His contributions are still widely discussed in the academic literature particularly upon operational bills, and building waste

== Operational bills ==
Tendering in the UK construction industry is traditionally based upon bills of quantities in which the estimation of costs is based on the combined cost of materials, building plant and labour in the completed works. Edward Skoyles proposed a new form of tendering, operational bills in which such tendering was based around building tasks. This allowed for the separate costing of materials, plant and labour. This offered several advantages including a more accurate ability to cost a proposed project, better communication between design and production and ease in creating critical-path analysis for the contractor. A refinement of this was "bills of quantities (operations)" in which the operations are described in terms of the rules of the standard method of measurement rather than labour and materials. Priced-activity schedules of the NEC Engineering and Construction Contract are a modern descendant of operational bills.

== Building waste ==
Traditionally, the estimates for normal waste on construction sites has been 2.5-5%, however, empirical observational research done by Skoyles on 280 sites found that this underestimated it by roughly half—equivalent annually to the materials needed to build a town the size of Colchester. Further considerable variability existed between sites suggesting an opportunity for improvement. This work led to allowances for materials waste to be more accurately allowed for in cost estimates. As Fellows and coauthors note his work was important since: "It is interesting to postulate the possible consequences of an estimate including only one-half of the requisite materials wastage allowance, especially during a period of slump, when small profit margins prevail … anticipated profit [of 2%] is almost entirely eroded". Further, this research highlighted the need for improved education in site practices: "In the constructions industry, Skoyles was the first to recognize that the problem of material wastage was more dependent upon the attitudes and behavioral tendencies of individuals involved than upon the technical processes employed".
