= Pre-construction services =

Pre-construction services are services that are offered to support owners, architects, and engineers in making decisions. They are used in planning a construction project before the actual construction begins. The stage where these services are offered is called pre-construction or "pre-con".

== Overview ==
In the long-established design-bid-build method of construction project delivery, a project would be entirely designed before being built. This resulted in a package of plans and specifications which formed the construction documents. After the acquisition of the construction documents, the owner would solicit bids (or tenders) from general contractors that are willing to manage the project. The owner will award the project to a successful bidder; In the design-bid-build method of construction project delivery, would be based on price.

Often the early feasibility, studies, and design development are supported by construction cost estimators, who prepare cost estimates. Usually cost estimates are supported by conceptual or rough-order-of-magnitude (ROM) estimates. The design then starts with a schematic design (SD) stage, followed by a design development stage, and culminates in a construction document state.

In the design-bid-build system, there is a construction bidding process that falls between the owner's original solicitation and the summation of a bid by a contractor. This only occurs after the completion of the construction documents. During this process, a contractor's construction cost estimator prepares a detailed estimate which will be needed for the summation of a bid. The creation of an estimate requires the inclusion of the cost of labor, overhead, profit, and equipment. The construction documents will also play a major role in estimating.

Pre-construction services grew out of construction cost estimating to encompass the other activities in planning a project. The intent is to work with the project's owner to help deliver a satisfactory project that meets the owner's objectives. In addition to estimating, the preconstruction team participates in design decisions, evaluations, studies, value engineering, value analysis, scheduling, constructability reviews, and more. Design costs, permitting, land acquisition, and life-cycle costs may also be evaluated. In delivering pre-construction services, general contractors or construction managers may also be negotiating for project construction services. Often this may be accomplished by agreeing on a guaranteed maximum price (GMP) for the project. The firm then delivers the project. Typically the owner and the firm share any cost savings realized during construction.

== Pre-construction services ==
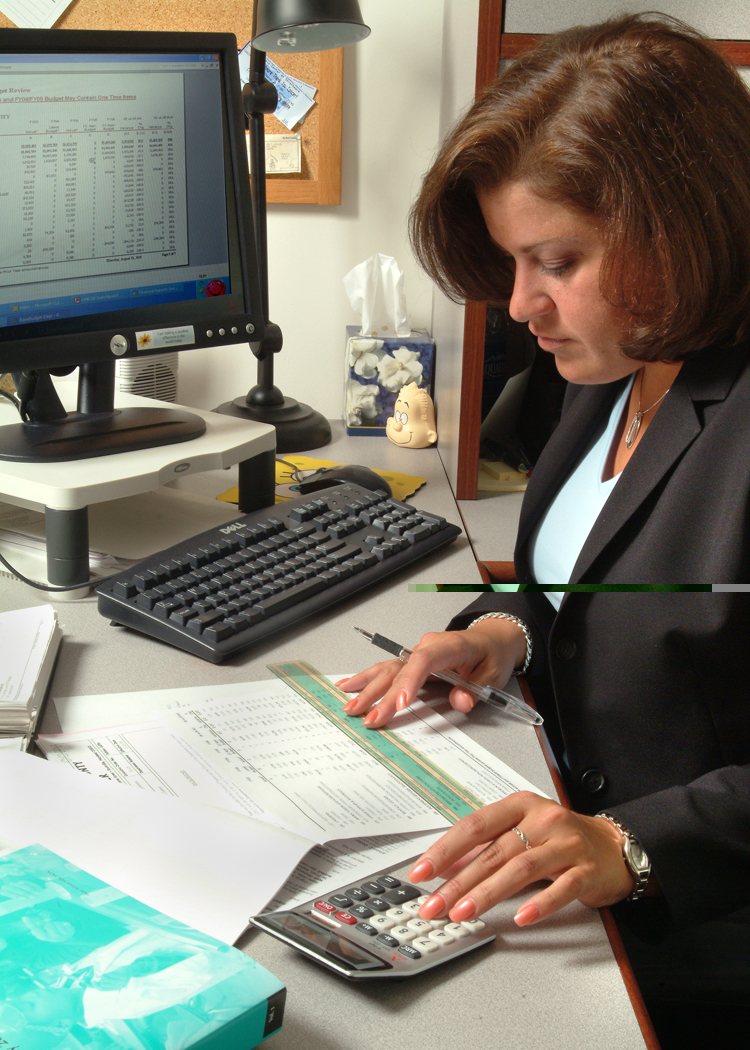
A person estimating

Pre-construction services cover a large range of jobs and activities that need to be completed before the start of a project. These services are to help lay out the foundation for the project, this helps the success of a construction project by making progress be as smooth at possible. Services may happen at different points depending on what type of project delivery method was used. These services are offered by project managers, engineers, contractors, and architects. Pre-construction services often cover the following:

- Creation of the initial building schematic design - The design of the building is brought forward to the client. This is to give the client an idea of what the project will look like. The design usually includes elevations, floor plans, site plans, or anything special details the client would have requested in particular. The owner has the chance at this point to change anything to their liking without having to submit a change order. This is most likely done by the architect and consultants. If the owner requests 3D computer-generated imagery of the building, it will most likely be done on BIM or other three-dimensional graphic imagery software. This is not the final design of the building.
- Permitting - Building permits are issued by the local building authority. Owners or the construction management team can get permits for the construction of their projects. It is imperative this is handled correctly as it will set the inspection schedule for the project.
- Conceptual Estimating: - The contractor will start estimating the overall budget of the construction project using the specifications of the project, construction estimating software, prior work experience, and other estimates given to them by subcontractors, manufacturers, and suppliers. At this point owner can adjust components of the building to better suit the budget or can ask the construction team to value engineer.
- Value engineering - The contractor, engineers, manufacturer, building trades, and architect are tasked to develop the best possible ways to look for substitution of procedures that can be altered and materials that function in similar ways. The search for substitution is done to give the client a cheaper bid project without sacrificing performance, reliability, quality, and safety.
- Soil testing - This service typically includes testing the soil for its moisture content, the specific gravity of soil, compaction test, and dry dense test. This is done to eliminate any unwanted surprises that directly correspond to any subsurface conditions.
- Creation of the schedule - a schedule is a list of milestones, deliveries, and activities. To make a project schedule many things must be completed such as milestones of the project, sequences of activities following up to each milestone, project scope, and the categorization of tasks into the 5 project phases(conception, definition & planning, launch, performance, close), and critical path analysis. The is provided to the client.

This is but a few examples of services that are offered. Other services are not limited to design management, life-cycle analysis, feasibility study, constructability, bidding, and subcontracting analysis.
