= Delivery schedule adherence =

Delivery schedule adherence (DSA) is a business metric used to calculate the timeliness of deliveries from suppliers. It is a commonly used supply chain metric and forms part of the Quality, Cost, Delivery group of performance indicators.

== Calculation ==
Delivery schedule adherence is calculated by dividing the number of “on time” deliveries in a period by the total number of deliveries made. The result is then multiplied by 100 and expressed as a percentage.

It is common for businesses to delineate the delivery schedule adherence results by supplier - this facilitates ranking and stratification in accordance with a suppliers performance.

== Relevance ==
Poor DSA can result in enhanced buffer stock being carried to compensate for suppliers that fail to deliver on time. This has an associated business cost whilst the potential for stock outs can impact on customer service levels. Targets for DSA are therefore usually set quite high and the calculation and review of the metric important. Some organizations experience problems in producing delivery schedule adherence information this can be caused by a failure of systems to record delivery forecast information, unreliable processes and poor communication between buyer and seller. Ensuring that DSA can be correctly calculated and then improved often forms part of improvement.
