= CEPCI =

CEPCI may refer to:

- Cashew Export Promotion Council of India
- Chemical Engineering Plant Cost Index
