= Houzz =

US home renovation platform

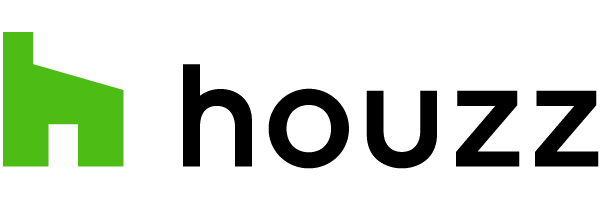
- Company type: Private
- Headquarters: Palo Alto, California, U.S.
- Area served: Worldwide
- Founders: Adi Tatarko; Alon Cohen
- Industry: Remodeling; Interior design
- Employees: 1,700+
- Website: www.houzz.com
- Users: 65 million (August 2022)
- Launched: February 2009; 17 years ago

Houzz is an American website, online community and business management software for architecture; interior design and decorating; landscape design and home improvement. It was founded in 2009 and is based in Palo Alto, California.

In addition to its consumer-facing marketplace and inspiration tools, the company offers Houzz Pro, a software suite for home professionals that includes project management, estimating, and 3D design tools. The platform supports millions of users and professionals worldwide and has expanded through acquisitions, mobile applications, and the integration of artificial intelligence and augmented reality features.

== History ==
=== Founding and early development ===
Houzz was founded as an online platform in February 2009 by Adi Tatarko and her husband Alon Cohen, in response to the challenges they faced with their own home remodeling project. They found it difficult to communicate their vision for their home, and to find the right professionals for their project. Cohen coded the initial website himself, and they asked a few Bay Area architects to upload their portfolios, to give home renovators ideas for their projects. The site spread by word-of-mouth and they began to receive emails from homeowners and home professionals outside the Bay Area asking them to open more categories on Houzz and expand to other areas. Houzz became a company in the fall of 2010.

In November 2010, Houzz released an app for iPad. The Android version of the app was released in December 2012. In July 2013, Houzz introduced the Real Cost Finder, an interactive tool that helps users plan home renovations and total costs. The tool is based on data collected from the Houzz community.

=== Global expansion and product development ===
In January 2014, Houzz announced that it had opened offices and hired local managers in the UK, Germany and Australia to accelerate its global expansion; 35% of the company's site traffic already came from outside the U.S. In February, Houzz launched Site Designer, a free website building and publishing tool for home professionals. In December, Houzz announced its expansion to the rest of Europe and into Asia, starting with Japan. It was reported that the Houzz database contained millions of images of home interiors and exteriors.

In May 2015, Houzz introduced HouzzTV, showing homeowners' projects using design professionals. In August, Houzz made its first acquisition, acquiring gardening and home advice site GardenWeb from NBCUniversal. In October, Houzz settled a privacy violation lawsuit for not providing the standard recorded notification that customers' and professionals' calls were being recorded for quality and training purposes.

In January 2016, Houzz introduced Sketch for Android. In February, Houzz introduced View in My Room within its app for iOS and Android that lets users virtually place products from the Houzz Marketplace in their homes before buying. In March, Houzz announced that it had opened its Commerce API to third party partners, to make it easier for merchants to sell and manage their inventory on Houzz. In May, Houzz won "Best App" at Google's inaugural Play Awards. In September, Houzz launched Visual Match, a tool that "uses deep learning technology to analyze more than 11 million home photos on Houzz. Furniture and decor that looks similar to the six million products on the Houzz Marketplace is then surfaced for users to browse (and hopefully buy)."

In May 2017, Houzz introduced a tool for its iPhone and iPad app, View in My Room 3D, that allows people to preview over 300,000 products in 3D within the context of their own rooms. In July, Sketch was made available as a web app. With the launch of iOS 11 from Apple in September, Houzz introduced an upgraded version of its 3D AR tool within its app for iPhone and iPad, with 500,000 products available to view.

In February 2018, Houzz acquired IvyMark, a company that developed business management software and a community platform for interior designers and home design firms. In March, the Houzz App for Android devices was updated with ARCore support, enabling users to "place virtual representations of furniture and other home decor items anywhere in their home to see how they would look."

As of June 2019, the company had reportedly 40 million users.

=== Pro launch and SaaS pivot ===
In April 2020, the company launched Houzz Pro software to help home professionals run their businesses. As of May, Houzz had over 20 million photos of design ideas on its platform.

By March 2021, the company reportedly had 2.7 million professionals in its professional services database.

In December 2021, the company announced its acquisition of SaaS takeoff and estimation tool ConX, and launched Houzz Pro Takeoffs as part of its Houzz Pro software.

In July 2024, Houzz integrated its AutoMate AI tool into Houzz Pro software, adding features including takeoffs and AI-generated estimates. Also in July 2024, new features for Houzz's 3D Floor Plan tool were announced.

=== Strategic Shift and International Restructuring (2025–2026) ===
Houzz underwent a significant shift in its business strategy in 2025 and 2026. In August 2025, the company transferred its e-commerce marketplace business to Cart.com, marking its retreat from direct product sales. In May 2026, it shut down Shop Houzz. The company subsequently began scaling back its international operations, including closing offices outside the United States, as it increasingly focused on its software business, particularly Houzz Pro.

== Products and services ==
Houzz offers a home design photo database with millions of images of home interiors and exteriors. Homeowners browse photos by room, style and location, and bookmark photos in personal collections the site calls ideabooks. Users can click on an image to learn more about the designer, ask a question, and learn about products tagged in the photos.

Houzz also has a directory of home improvement professionals who use the site to reach homeowners. The platform can be used for consumers to search through professionals for hire, view their previous projects, and ultimately hire them.

=== Houzz Pro software ===
The company's Houzz Pro software helps designers manage their projects, coordinate new business and handle financial details. The software integrates AI and cloud technology with takeoff capabilities and 3D design tools to simplify project lifecycle management.

=== HouzzTV ===
The company's HouzzTV video series shows homeowners' projects being implemented with the help of design professionals. Notable homeowners featured include Kristen Bell, Mila Kunis, and Taraji P. Henson.

== Reception ==
Bloomberg Businessweek called Houzz "An online antidote to the housing bust." Architectural Digest wrote about how the app would encourage imagination. TechCrunch wrote that the idea behind the company was well-executed. The Mercury News wrote about the breadth of ideas for customers and their architects to collaborate with. In 2012, The New York Times noted that the app was one of the few nongame apps on iOS that had a 5 star rating. In 2024, Fast Company named Houzz Pro software as one of its 5 next big things in building and real estate technology for the year.
