= Martin Barnes =

Martin Barnes may refer to:

- Martin G. Barnes, New Jersey politician
- Martin Barnes (engineer), engineer and project manager
