= Skoyles =

Skoyles is a surname. Notable people with the surname include:

- Edward Skoyles (1923–2008), English surveyor
- John Skoyles (poet) (born 1949), American poet and writer
- John Skoyles (scientist), English neuroscientist and evolutionary psychologist
- Tracey Skoyles (born 1967), Irish cricketer
