= Construction estimating software =

Type of cost analysis software

Construction cost estimating software is computer software designed for contractors to estimate construction costs for a specific project. A cost estimator will typically use estimating software to estimate their bid price for a project, which will ultimately become part of a resulting construction contract. Some architects, engineers, construction managers, and others may also use cost estimating software to prepare cost estimates for purposes other than bidding such as budgeting and insurance claims.

== Methods ==
=== Traditional methods ===
Construction contractors usually prepare bids or tenders to compete for a contract award for a project. To prepare the bid, first a cost estimate is prepared to determine the costs and then establish the price(s). This involves reviewing the project's plans and specifications to produce a takeoff or quantity survey, which is a listing of all the materials and items of work required for a construction project by the construction documents. Together with prices for these components, the measured quantities are the basis for calculation of the direct cost. Indirect costs and profit are added to arrive at a total amount.

=== Spreadsheets ===
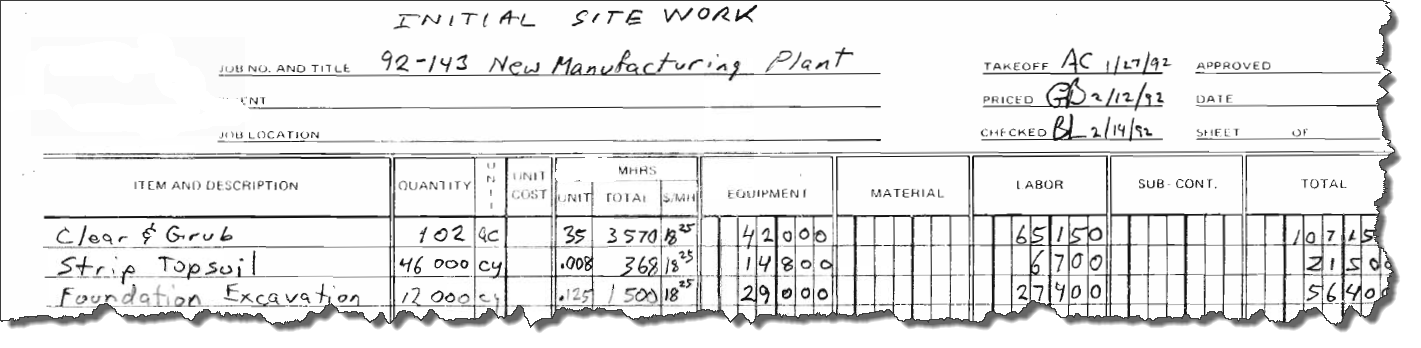
A handwritten spreadsheet.

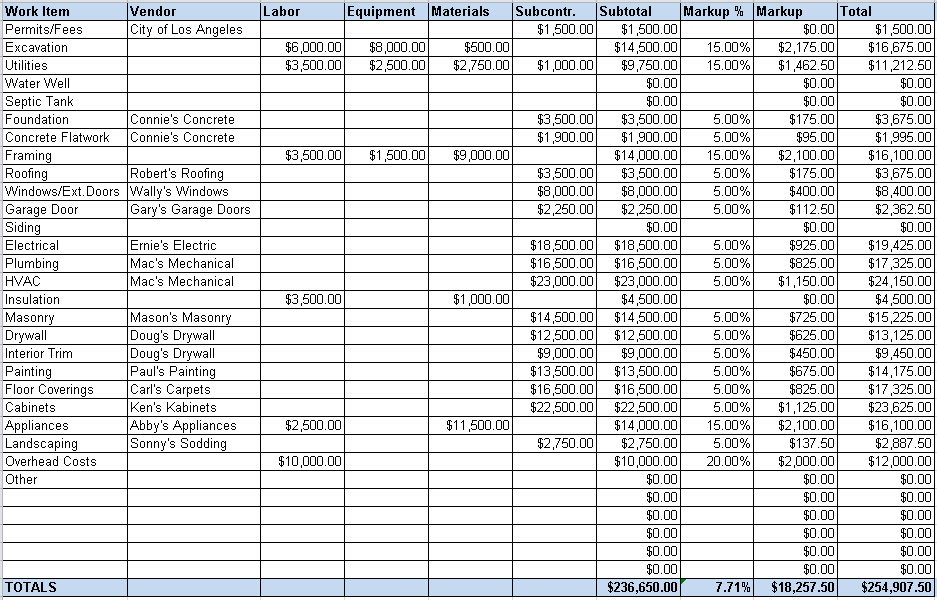
A basic estimating spreadsheet.

Cost estimators used columnar sheets of paper to organize the take-off and the estimate itself into rows of items and columns containing the description, quantity and the pricing components. Some of these were similar to accounting ledger paper. They became known as green sheets or spreadsheets.

With the advent of computers in business, estimators began using spreadsheet applications like VisiCalc, Lotus 1-2-3, and Microsoft Excel to duplicate the traditional tabular format, while automating redundant mathematical formulas.

Many construction cost estimators continue to rely primarily upon manual methods, hard copy documents, and/or electronic spreadsheets such as Microsoft Excel. While spreadsheets are relatively easy to master and provide a means to create and report a construction cost estimate and or cost models, their benefit comes largely from their ability to partially relieve estimators of mundane calculations. Accuracy, however, is not necessarily improved and productivity is not maximized. For example, data entry remains tedious and prone to error, formula errors are common, and collaboration and information sharing are limited.

=== Commercial estimating software ===
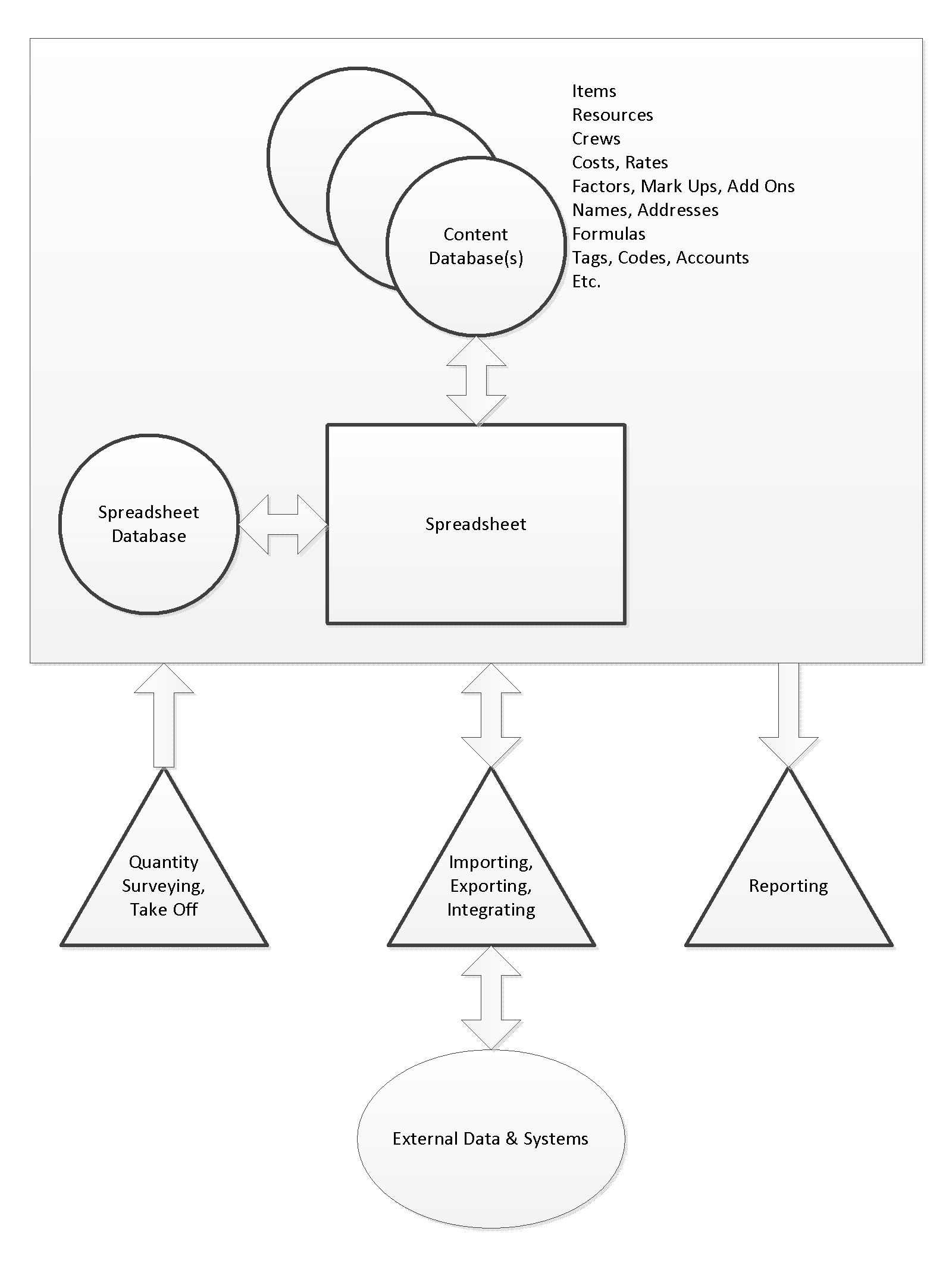
Estimating Software Block Diagram

As cost estimators came to rely heavily on spreadsheets, and the formulas within the spreadsheets became more complex, spreadsheet errors became more frequent. These were typically formula errors and cell-reference errors which would often lead to cost overruns. As a result, commercial cost estimating software applications were originally created to overcome these errors by using hard-coded formulas and data structures. Other benefits include the use of reference to cost databases (aka "cost books") and other data, predictable and professional looking reports, speed, accuracy, and overall process standardization.

As cost estimating programs became more and more popular over the years, more advanced features, such as saving data for reuse, mass project-wide changes, and trade-specific calculations, have become available. For example, programs that are designed for building construction, include libraries and program features for traditional builders. In sharp contrast, programs that are designed for civil construction, include libraries and program features for roadway, utility, and bridge builders.

Sophisticated, cost estimating and Efficient Project Delivery Software systems are also available to integrate various construction delivery methods such as Integrated Project Delivery, Job Order Contracting, and others (IDIQ, JOC, SABER...) simultaneously and securely. These systems enable cost estimators and project managers to collaboratively work with multiple projects, multiple estimates, and multiple contracts. A 'short list' of additional capabilities includes the ability to work with multiple cost books/guides/UPBs, track project status, automatically compare estimates, easily copy/paste, clone, and reuse estimates, and integrated sophisticated visual estimating and quantity take-off (QTO) tools. Owners, contractors, architects and engineers are moving to advanced cost estimating and management systems, and many oversight groups such are beginning to also require their use. The level of collaboration, transparency, and information re-use enabled by Cost Estimating and Efficient Project Delivery Software drives 15-25%+ reductions in procurement cycles, six to ten times faster estimating, reduce overall project times, as a significant reduction in change orders and the virtual elimination of contract related legal disputes.

== Typical features ==
Three functions prove to be the most critical when buying cost estimating software:

- Takeoff software – this provides for measurement from paper or electronic plans.
- Built-in cost databases⁣ – this provides reference cost data which may be your own or may come from a commercial source, such as RS Means
- Estimating worksheets – these are the spreadsheets where the real work takes place, supported by calculations and other features

Other typical features include:

- Item or Activity List: All estimating software applications will include a main project window that outlines the various items or activities that will be required to complete the specified project. More advanced programs are capable of breaking an item up into sub-tasks, or sublevels. An outline view of all the top-level and sublevel items provides a quick and easy way to view and navigate through the project.
- Resource Costs: Resources consist of labor, equipment, materials, subcontractors, trucking, and any other cost detail items. Labor and equipment costs are internal crew costs, whereas all other resource costs are received from vendors, such as material suppliers, subcontractors, and trucking companies. Labor costs are usually calculated from wages, benefits, burden, and workers' compensation. Equipment costs are calculated from purchase price, taxes, fuel consumption, and other operating expenses.
- Item or Activity Detail: The detail to each item includes all the resources required to complete each activity, as well as their associated costs. Production rates will automatically determine required crew costs.

The SharpeSoft Estimator, displaying an example of a trench calculation.

- Calculations: Most estimating programs have built-in calculations ranging from simple length, area, and volume calculations to complex industry-specific calculations, such as electrical calculations, utility trench calculations, and earthwork cut and fill calculations.
- Markups: Every program allows for cost mark-ups ranging from flat overall mark-ups to resource-specific mark-ups, mark-ups for general administrative costs, and bonding costs.
- Detailed Overhead: Indirect costs, such as permits, fees, and any other overall project costs can be spread to billable project items.
- Closeout Window: Many estimating programs include a screen for manually adjusting bid prices from their calculated values.
- Reporting: Project reports typically include proposals, detail reports, cost breakdown reports, and various charts and graphs.
- Exporting: Most software programs can export project data to other applications, such as spreadsheets, accounting software, and project management software.
- Job History: Storing past projects is a standard feature in most estimating programs.
