= Value stream costing =

In accounting, value stream costing (VSC) is a technique of costing which entails identifying and calculating costs for all the process steps required for providing value to the customer. It begins with a mapping and tracking all the process steps that provide the value and then quantification of the value created by each step.
