= Cost contingency =

Estimation in cost engineering

When estimating the cost for a project, product or other item or investment, there is always uncertainty as to the precise content of all items in the estimate, how work will be performed, what work conditions will be like when the project is executed and so on. These uncertainties are risks to the project. Some refer to these risks as "known-unknowns" because the estimator is aware of them, and based on past experience, can even estimate their probable costs. The estimated costs of the known-unknowns is referred to by cost estimators as cost contingency.

Contingency "refers to costs that will probably occur based on past experience, but with some uncertainty regarding the amount. The term is not used as a catchall to cover ignorance. It is poor engineering and poor philosophy to make second-rate estimates and then try to satisfy them by using a large contingency account. The contingency allowance is designed to cover items of cost which are not known exactly at the time of the estimate but which will occur on a statistical basis."

The cost contingency which is included in a cost estimate, bid, or budget may be classified as to its general purpose, that is what it is intended to provide for. For a class 1 construction cost estimate, usually needed for a bid estimate, the contingency may be classified as an estimating and contracting contingency. This is intended to provide compensation for "estimating accuracy based on quantities assumed or measured, unanticipated market conditions, scheduling delays and acceleration issues, lack of bidding competition, subcontractor defaults, and interfacing omissions between various work categories." Additional classifications of contingency may be included at various stages of a project's life, including design contingency, or design definition contingency, or design growth contingency, and change order contingency (although these may be more properly called allowances).

== Definition ==
AACE International has defined contingency as "An amount added to an estimate to allow for items, conditions, or events for which the state, occurrence, or effect is uncertain and that experience shows will likely result, in aggregate, in additional costs. Typically estimated using statistical analysis or judgment based on past asset or project experience. Contingency usually excludes:

1. Major scope changes such as changes in end product specification, capacities, building sizes, and location of the asset or project
2. Extraordinary events such as major strikes and natural disasters
3. Management reserves
4. Escalation and currency effects

Some of the items, conditions, or events for which the state, occurrence, and/or effect is uncertain include, but are not limited to, planning and estimating errors and omissions, minor price fluctuations (other than general escalation), design developments and changes within the scope, and variations in market and environmental conditions. Contingency is generally included in most estimates, and is expected to be expended".

A key phrase above is that it is "expected to be expended". In other words, it is an item in an estimate like any other, and should be estimated and included in every estimate and every budget. Because management often thinks contingency money is "fat" that is not needed if a project team does its job well, it is a controversial topic.

== Methods to estimate contingency ==
In general, there are four classes of methods used to estimate contingency:

1. Expert judgment
2. Predetermined guidelines (with varying degrees of judgment and empiricism used)
3. Simulation analysis (primarily risk analysis judgment incorporated in a simulation such as Monte-Carlo)
4. Parametric modeling (empirically-based algorithm, usually derived through regression analysis, with varying degrees of judgment used).

While all are valid methods, the method chosen should be consistent with the first principles of risk management in that the method must start with risk identification, and only then are the probable cost of those risks quantified. In best practice, the quantification will be probabilistic in nature (Monte-Carlo is a common method used for quantification).

Typically, the method results in a distribution of possible cost outcomes for the project, product, or other investment. From this distribution, a cost value can be selected that has the desired probability of having a cost underrun or cost overrun. Usually a value is selected with equal chance of over or underrunning. The difference between the cost estimate without contingency, and the selected cost from the distribution is contingency. For more information, AACE International has catalogued many professional papers on this complex topic.

== Control account ==
Contingency is included in budgets as a control account. As risks occur on a project, and money is needed to pay for them, the contingency can be transferred to the appropriate accounts that need it. The transfer and its reason is recorded. In risk management, risks are continually reassessed during the course of a project, as are the needs for cost contingency.

== See also ==
Lists

- Glossary of construction cost estimating
- Glossary of project management

Related fields

- Construction bidding
- Cost engineering
- Industrial engineering
- Pre-construction services
- Project management
- Total cost management

Related topics

- Retentions in the British construction industry
- Mobilization payment, an advance payment to a contractor at the start of a project to assist in the beginning of operations.

Professional organizations

- AACE International
- American Society of Professional Estimators
- Project Management Institute
- Royal Institution of Chartered Surveyors
