= CESMM3 =

The Civil Engineering Standard Method of Measurement (commonly known as CESMM3) sets out a procedure for the preparation of a bill of quantities for civil engineering works, for pricing and for expression and measurement of quantities of work.

CESMM3 includes 26 main clauses of work:

| Class | Description |
|---|---|
| A | General Items |
| B | Ground Investigation |
| C | Geotechnical & other specialist process |
| D | Demolition and Site Clearance |
| E | Earthworks |
| F | In situ Concrete |
| G | Concrete ancillaries |
| H | Precast Concrete |
| I | Pipework - Pipes |
| J | Pipework - Fittings and valves |
| K | Pipework - Manholes and pipework ancillaries |
| L | Pipework - Supports and protection, ancillary to laying and excavation |
| M | Structural Metal works |
| N | Miscellaneous Metal works |
| O | Timber |
| P | Piles |
| Q | Piling ancillaries |
| R | Roads and pavings |
| S | Rail Track |
| T | Tunnels |
| U | Brickwork, block work and masonry |
| V | Painting |
| W | Waterproofing |
| X | Miscellaneous works |
| Y | Sewer and water main renovation and ancillary works |
| Z | Simple building works incidental to civil engineering works |
