= TDC =

TDC may refer to:

== Organisations ==
- Hong Kong Trade Development Council
- Taiwan Design Center, an art organization based in Taipei, Taiwan
- TDC A/S, a Danish telecommunications company
- Teradata Corporation (U.S. ticker symbol)
- Texas Department of Criminal Justice, formerly the Texas Department of Corrections
- Type Directors Club, an international organization specialising in typography
- Theta Delta Chi, a social fraternity founded at Union College, New York, US
- The Discovery Channel, former name of Discovery Channel

== Places ==
- Tristan da Cunha, both a remote group of volcanic islands in the south Atlantic Ocean and the main island of that group
- Tokyo Dome City, an entertainment complex in Tokyo, Japan
- Toronto-Dominion Centre, a cluster of buildings in Toronto, Ontario, Canada

== Technology ==
- Time-to-digital converter, a device in signal processing
- Top dead center, the position furthest from the crankshaft of a piston in a reciprocating engine, see Dead centre (engineering)
- Torpedo Data Computer, a piece of naval technology

== Other uses ==
- Total delivery cost, the amount of money it takes for a company to manufacture and deliver a product
- Trophée des Champions, a French association football trophy
- The Death Cure, a science fiction novel by American writer James Dashner
- Trainee Detective Constable, the most junior British police Criminal Investigation Department (CID) rank; See Police ranks of the United Kingdom
