= Quality, cost, delivery =

Approach to production processes

Quality, cost, delivery (QCD), sometimes expanded to quality, cost, delivery, morale, safety (QCDMS), is a management approach originally developed by the British automotive industry. QCD assess different components of the production process and provides feedback in the form of facts and figures that help managers make logical decisions. By using the gathered data, it is easier for organizations to prioritize their future goals. QCD helps break down processes to organize and prioritize efforts before they grow overwhelming.

QCD is a "three-dimensional" approach. If there is a problem with even one dimension, the others will inevitably suffer as well. One dimension cannot be sacrificed for the sake of the other two.

== Quality ==
Quality is the ability of a product or service to meet and exceed customer expectations. It is the result of the efficiency of the entire production process formed of people, material, and machinery. Customer requirements determine the quality scope.

Quality is a competitive advantage; poor quality often results in bad business. The U.S. business organizations in the 1970s focused more on cost and productivity. That approach led to Japanese businesses capturing a major share of the U.S. market. It was not until the late 1970s and the beginning of the 1980s that the quality factor drastically shifted and became a strategic approach, created by Harvard professor David Garvin. This approach focuses on preventing mistakes and puts a great emphasis on customer satisfaction.

=== Quality basis ===
David A. Garvin lists eight dimensions of quality:

- Performance is a product's primary operating characteristics. For example, for a vehicle audio system, those characteristics include sound quality, surround sound, and Wi-Fi connectivity.
- Conformance refers to the degree to which a certain product meets the customer's expectations.
- Special features or extras are additional features of a product or service. An example of extras could be free meals on an airplane or Internet access for a TV.
- Aesthetics refer to a product's looks, sound, feel, smell, or taste. Aesthetics are subjective; thus, achieving total customer satisfaction is impossible. For example, not all customers like the smell of a certain perfume.
- Durability refers to how long the product lasts before it has to be replaced. Better raw materials and manufacturing processes can improve durability. For home appliances and automobiles, durability is a primary characteristic of quality.
- Reliability refers to the time until a product breaks down and has to be repaired, but not replaced. This feature is very important for products that have expensive maintenance.
- Serviceability is defined by speed, courtesy, competence and ease of repair." Customers want products that are quickly and easily serviceable.
- Perceived quality, which may be affected by the high price or the good aesthetics of a product.

=== Product components ===
The quality of a product depends almost entirely on the quality of its raw material. Suppliers and manufacturers must work together to eliminate defects and achieve higher quality. Small and medium-sized enterprises (SMEs) should discuss with their suppliers how quality improvements can affect the overall performance of the supply chain. Quality assurance can reduce testing, scrapping, reworks, and production costs.

=== Consequences of poor quality ===
- Business loss: Poor quality results in unsatisfied customers and business loss, especially where customers can easily switch to a competitor.
- Reduced productivity: Poor-quality products must often be reworked or scrapped entirely, which diminishes usable output.
- Higher operating costs: Harrington argued that poor quality affects costs. Counterintuitively, higher costs are attached to offering lower-quality products and services. A reduction of cost and scheduling problems is achievable by avoiding the production of poor quality goods and services.

== Costs ==
The biggest costs in most businesses are the four basic types of manufacturing costs:

1. Raw materials
2. Direct labour
3. Variable overhead – production costs that increase or decrease depending on the quantity produced. For example, electricity is a variable overhead. If a company increases production, it will also increase the usage of equipment, which will result in a higher electricity bill.
4. Fixed overhead

In addition, there are business costs that stay the same, regardless of the production output. Business costs include:

1. Salaries for employees that do not work directly on the production line (e.g. security guards or safety inspectors.)
2. Depreciation costs
3. Occupancy costs (e.g., property taxes and building insurance)

Businesses desire to reduce costs to increase their operating profit and bottom line. Cost reduction strategies include:

- Minimizing supplier costs
- Adopting lean manufacturing
- Eliminating waste

== Delivery ==
Logistics are an essential part in providing good customer service on time. Logistics customer service can be separated into three elements:

- Pre-transaction elements (before delivery)
- Transaction elements (during delivery)
- Post-transaction elements (after delivery)

== Benefits ==
QCD offers a method of measuring both simple and complicated business processes. It also represents a basis for comparing businesses: for example, a business measuring a supplier's delivery performance may compare its findings with the business's own performance.

== Flexibility ==
The "quality, cost, delivery, and flexibility" (QCDF) approach, includes flexibility as the capacity to adapt to changes or modifications in the input quality, output quality, product specifications, and delivery schedules.

== Profitability ==
There are seven measures used to increase profitability.

=== Not right first time (NRFT) ===
Not getting things right the first time means wasted resources, effort and time. This all leads to excessive costs for the company and poor-quality, high-priced products for the customer. NRFT measures the quality of a product and is expressed in “number of defective parts per million”. The number of defective products is divided by the total quantity of finished products. This figure is then multiplied by 10^6 to get the number of defective parts per million.

NRFT can be measured internally (defective parts identified within the production process) or externally (defective parts identified outside the production process (e.g. by the supplier or the customer).

=== Delivery schedule achievement (DSA) ===
DSA analyses how well a supplier delivers what the customer wants and when they want it. The goal is to achieve 100% on-time delivery without any special deliveries or overtime payments, which only increase the delivery cost. DSA measures the actual delivery performance against the planned delivery schedule. Failed deliveries include:

1. "Not on time" deliveries – both late and early.
2. "Incorrect quantity deliveries".
3. Both "not on time" and "incorrect quantity deliveries".

=== People productivity (PP) ===
PP is measured by the time it takes (in staff hours) to produce a good-quality product. Obtaining high PP is only possible when:

1. Most employees' work adds value to the process.
2. Non-value added work is reduced as much as possible.
3. Waste is completely eliminated .

=== Stock turns (ST) ===
The ST ratio shows how quickly a company turns raw materials into finished, ready-to-be-sold products. The quicker the better. A low ST means that the money is tied up in stock, and the company has fewer funds to invest in other parts of its business.

=== Overall equipment effectiveness (OEE) ===
The OEE shows how well a company uses its equipment and staff.

OEE is calculated on the base of three elements:

1. Availability – compares the planned and the actual time of the process run. For example, if a machine is planned to run 100 hours a week, but in reality runs only 50, then the availability is 50%.
2. Performance – compares the ideal output and the actual output. For example, if a certain process is planned to take 10 minutes, but actually takes 20, then the productivity is 50%.
3. Quality – to show the quality of a product, a company has to compare the number of good parts produced with the total parts produced. If it produces 100 parts per hour but only 50 of them are of saleable standard, then quality is running at 50%.

=== Value added per person (VAPP) ===
VAPP shows how well people are used to turn raw materials into finished goods. In order to calculate VAPP, three things need to be taken into account:

1. The sales value of a unit after production (output value).
2. The raw material value of a unit before production (input value).
3. The number of direct production process employees.

=== Floor space utilisation (FSU) ===
FSU measures the sales revenue generated by a square meter of factory floor space. Usually to achieve higher FSU the floor space has to be reduced. That means eliminating inventory and reducing the necessary space to a minimum.

== See also ==
- Project management triangle
- Trilemma
