= Efficiency–thoroughness trade-off principle =

Principle in economics and time management

The efficiency–thoroughness trade-off principle (or ETTO principle) is the principle that there is a trade-off between efficiency or effectiveness on one hand, and thoroughness (such as safety assurance and human reliability) on the other. In accordance with this principle, demands for productivity tend to reduce thoroughness while demands for safety reduce efficiency.

The ETTO principle was formulated by safety researcher Erik Hollnagel in 2009.

== In safety ==
The principle has been applied to analysis of behaviour and choices made regarding safety and risk. There are competing activities requiring time, which is a limited resource. In order to make time available for desirable activities, less time can be spent on preparation and planning, which affects safety. Most of the time the trade-off ends well, and the preferred or profitable activity proceeds without undesirable incident, which is why these trade-offs are so prevalent. Eventually luck may run out and something goes wrong. In hindsight it is often obvious when and where such trade-offs were made, and the consequences may be clearly linked to causes, but the trade-off seemed like a good idea at the time, and for as long as things kept going right. The principle of requiring "reasonably practicable" precautions in occupational health and safety recognises that such trade-offs must exist to allow economic activity to proceed, and puts the onus on the employer to assess the risk and take those precautions.

== See also ==
- Project management triangle
