= Uniformat =

Construction standard

Uniformat is a standard for classifying building specifications, cost estimating, and cost analysis in the U.S. and Canada. The elements are major components common to most buildings. The system can be used to provide consistency in the economic evaluation of building projects. It was developed through an industry and government consensus and has been widely accepted as an ASTM standard.

== History ==
Hanscomb Associates, a cost consultant, developed a system called MASTERCOST in 1973 for the American Institute of Architects (AIA). The U.S. General Services Administration (GSA), which is responsible for government buildings, was also developing a system. The AIA and GSA agreed on a system and named it UNIFORMAT. The AIA included it in their practice on construction management, and the GSA included it in their project estimating requirements. In 1989, ASTM International began developing a standard for classifying building elements, based on UNIFORMAT. It was renamed to UNIFORMAT II. In 1995, the Construction Specifications Institute (CSI) and Construction Specifications Canada (CSC) began to revise Uniformat. UniFormat is now a registered trademark of CSI and CSC and was most recently published in 2010.

A new strategy to classify the built environment, named OmniClass, incorporates the elemental building classification in its Table 21 Elements. The numbering system is changed in OmniClass.

== Uniformat level 1 categories ==
- A SUBSTRUCTURE
- B SHELL
- C INTERIORS
- D SERVICES
- E EQUIPMENT AND FURNISHINGS
- F SPECIAL CONSTRUCTION AND DEMOLITION
- G BUILDING SITEWORK
- Z GENERAL

== Uniformat levels 2 and 3 categories ==
An example of how the numbering system expands to provide additional detail below level 1 is shown for A SUBSTRUCTURE

  A10 FOUNDATIONS
       A1010 Standard Foundations
       A1020 Special Foundations
  A40 SLABS-ON-GRADE
       A4010 Standard Slabs-on-Grade
       A4020 Structural Slabs-on-Grade
       A4030 Slab Trenches
       A4040 Pits and Bases
       A4090 Slab-on-Grade Supplementary Components

== CSI/CSC UniFormat level 1 numbers and titles ==
- PROJECT DESCRIPTION
- A SUBSTRUCTURE
- B SHELL
- C INTERIORS
- D SERVICES
- E EQUIPMENT AND FURNISHINGS
- F SPECIAL CONSTRUCTION AND DEMOLITION
- G BUILDING SITEWORK
- Z GENERAL
