= Design–bid–build =

Project delivery method

Design–bid–build (or design/bid/build, and abbreviated D–B–B or D/B/B accordingly), also known as design–tender (or "design/tender"), traditional method, or hardbid, is a project delivery method in which the agency or owner contracts with separate entities for the design and construction of a project.

Design–bid–build is the traditional method for project delivery and differs in several substantial aspects from design–build.

There are three main sequential phases to the design–bid–build delivery method:

- The design phase
- The bidding (or tender) phase
- The construction phase

== Design phase ==
In this phase, the owner retains an architect (or consulting engineer for infrastructure works) to design and produce bid documents, including construction drawings and technical specifications, on which various general contractors will in turn bid to construct the project. For building projects, the architect will work with the owner to identify the owner's needs, develop a written program documenting those needs and then produce a conceptual and/or schematic design. This early design is then developed, and the architect will usually bring in other design professionals including a structural engineer, sometimes a civil engineer, mechanical, electrical, and plumbing engineers ("MEP engineers"), a fire protection engineer and often a landscape architect to help complete the construction drawings and technical specifications. The finished bid documents are coordinated by the architect and owner for issuance to general contractors during the bid phase.

Design fees are typically between 5-10% of the total project cost.

== Bid (or tender) phase ==
Bidding can be "open", in which any qualified bidder may participate, or "select", in which a limited number of pre-selected contractors are invited to bid.

The various general contractors bidding on the project obtain copies of the bid (or tender) documents, and then put them out to multiple subcontractors for bids on sub-components of the project. Sub-components include items such as the concrete work, structural steel frame, electrical systems, HVAC, and landscaping. Questions may arise during the bid (or tender) period, and the architect will typically issue clarifications or corrections to the bid documents in the form of addenda. From these elements, the contractor compiles a complete bid (or "tender price") for submission by the established closing date and time (i.e., bid date). Bids can be based on the quantities of materials in the completed construction (e.g., as in the UK with bills of quantities), the operations needed to build it (e.g., as in operational bills), or simply as a lump sum cost; however, these bid requirements are elucidated within the bid documents.

Once bids are received, the architect typically reviews the bids, seeks any clarifications required of the bidders, investigates contractor qualifications, ensures all documentation is in order (including bonding if required), and advises the owner as to the ranking of the bids. If the bids fall in a range acceptable to the owner, the owner and architect discuss the suitability of various bidders and their proposals. The owner is not obligated to accept the lowest bid, and it is customary for other factors including past performance and quality of other work to influence the selection process. However, the project is typically awarded to the general contractor with the lowest bid.

In the event that all of the bids do not satisfy the needs of the owner, whether for financial reasons or otherwise, the owner may choose to reject all bids. The following options become available to the owner:

- Re-bid (or re-tender) the construction of the project on a future date when the owner's needs are met, such as when money becomes available and/or construction costs go down.
- Abandon the project entirely.
- Issue a work order to have the architect revise the design (sometimes at no cost to the Owner, if previously negotiated), so as to make the project smaller or more efficient, or reduce features or elements of the project to bring the cost down. The revised bid documents can then be issued again for bid (or re-tendered).
- Select a general contractor, such as the lowest bidder, or an experienced cost estimator to assist the architect with design changes aimed at cost reduction. This process is often referred to as value engineering. The revised bid documents can then be issued again for bid (or re-tendered).

== Construction phase ==
Once the construction of the project has been awarded to the contractor, the bid documents (e.g., approved construction drawings and technical specifications) may not be altered. The necessary permits (for example, a building permit) must be achieved from all jurisdictional authorities in order for the construction process to begin. Should design changes be necessary during construction, whether initiated by the contractor, owner, or as discovered by the architect, the architect may issue sketches or written clarifications. The contractor may be required to document "as built" conditions to the owner.

In most instances, nearly every component of a project is supplied and installed by sub-contractors. The general contractor may provide work with its own forces, but it is common for a general contractor to limit its role primarily to managing the construction process and daily activity on a construction site (see also construction management).

During the construction phase the architect also acts as the owner's agent to review the progress of the work as it relates to pay requests from the Contractor, and to issue site instructions, change orders (or field orders), or other documentation necessary to facilitate the construction process and certify that the project is built to the approved construction drawings.

== Potential problems of design–bid–build ==
- Failure of the design team to retain current familiarity with construction costs, and any potential cost increases during the design phase could cause project delays if the construction documents must be redone to reduce costs.
- Redesign expense can be disputed should the architect's contract not specifically address the issue of revisions required to reduce costs.
- Development of a "cheaper is better" mentality amongst the general contractors bidding the project so there is the tendency to seek out the lowest cost sub-contractors in a given market. In strong markets, general contractors will be able to be selective about which projects to bid, but in lean times, the desire for work usually forces the low bidder of each trade to be selected. This usually results in increased risk (for the general contractor) and can also compromise the quality of construction. In the extreme, it can lead to serious disputes involving quality of the final product, or bankruptcy of a sub-contractor who was on the brink of insolvency desperate for work.
- As the general contractor is brought to the team post-design, there is little opportunity for input on effective alternates being presented.
- Pressures may be exerted on the design and construction teams due to competing interests (e.g., economy versus acceptable quality), which may lead to disputes between the architect and the general contractor, and associated delays in construction.

== Benefits of design–bid–build ==
- The design team looks out for the interests of the owner.
- The design team prepares documents on which all general contractors place bids. With this in mind, the "cheaper is better" argument is rendered invalid since the bids are based on complete documents. Incomplete, incorrect or missed items are usually discovered and addressed during the bid process in the form of addenda.
- Ensures fairness to potential bidders and improves decision making by the owner by providing a range of potential options. It also identifies new potential contractors.
- Assists the owner in establishing reasonable prices for the project.
- Uses competition both in the selection of the architect and the contractor to improve the efficiency and quality for owners.

== See also ==
- Architectural services
- Architectural engineering
- Civil engineering
- Construction engineering
- Construction software
- Construction management
- Joint Contracts Tribunal
- Submittals (construction)
- Shop drawing
- Public–private partnership
