= Construction bidding =

Competitive process for construction contracts

Construction bidding is the process of submitting a proposal (tender) to undertake, or manage the undertaking of a construction project. The process starts with a cost estimate from blueprints and material take offs.

The tender is treated as an offer to do the work for a certain amount of money (firm price), or a certain amount of profit (cost reimbursement or cost plus). The tender, which is submitted by the competing firms, is generally based on a bill of quantities, a bill of approximate quantities or other specifications which enable the tenders to attain higher levels of accuracy, the statement of work.

== Bid solicitation ==
Bid solicitation is the process of making published construction data readily available to interested parties, including construction managers, contractors, and the public. There are several services, including government entities and private plan rooms, that allow project owners to release project details to solicit and obtain contractor bids. These services act as a gateway for project owners to release project information to a large group of contractors, general contractors or subcontractors in an attempt to solicit bids. Many of these services are subscription based or charge a flat rate for project data.

== Contractual formation ==
Depending upon the language in the bid proposal, a subcontracting construction company could make its bid final, and, if accepted, a legally enforceable contract is created. In these circumstances, upon determination by the general contractor that a bid is the lowest offer, it can accept the bid and, upon acceptance, a subcontractor cannot renege or revoke its offer. The language of the bid or offer can impact the court's determination of whether the subcontractor intended for further negotiations to take place, or whether the bid was intended to be an option or unilateral agreement to enter into a contract upon acceptance of the offer.

== Types of project delivery (procurement methods) ==
All construction procurement methods can be divided into two categories.

1. Traditional procurement route
2. Alternative procurement route.

=== Traditional procurement route ===
There are three types of traditional procurement route used in the construction industry:

1. Lump-sum contracts
2. Re-measurable contracts
3. Cost reimbursement

The traditional procurement method is the most common construction delivery method. This process begins with an owner selecting an architect to prepare construction documents. These are prepared using drafting standards such as the NEC Engineering and Construction Contract or (formerly) the Institution of Civil Engineers' (ICE) Conditions of Contract. In most cases, the architect will release these construction documents publicly, or to a select group of general contractors, who will then place a bid on the project which reflects what they believe cost of construction will total. This bid is inclusive of a multitude of subcontractor bids for each specific trade. The general contractor's fee is generally built into the bid cost. Most government contracts are bid competitively using this method.

=== Alternative procurement routes ===
The most popular alternative procurement routes seen in the construction industry are:

- Design & build
- Management Contracting

== Tender ==
Tender is treated as an offer to do the work for a certain amount of money (firm price), or a certain amount of profit (cost reimbursement or cost plus). The tender, which is submitted by the competing firms, is generally based on a bill of quantities, a bill of approximate quantities or other specifications which enable the tenders to attain higher levels of accuracy, the statement of work.

For instance, a bill of quantities is a list of all the materials (and other work such as amount of excavation) of a project which have sufficient detail to obtain a realistic cost, or rate per described item of work/material. The tenders should not only show the unit cost per material/work, but should also if possible, break it down to labour, plant and material costs. In this way the individual who is selecting the tender will have confidence that the tender is feasible. Bids are not only chosen on cost alone; sometimes contractors submit lower tenders to win the contract and win the work. Either the costs that the contractor incurs are greater than the price he is charging the client (as a consequence of a lower tender determining the contract sum), and thus is likely to go insolvent, or he will claim for "loss and/or expense" due to discrepancies in the contract documents (this can be done deliberately). The lowest tender is not always a feasible tender. In addition to the bid number, the contractor must be technically qualified and carry liability insurance. The lowest tender is the most likely to increase the contract sum the most throughout the course of the project.

== Methods of tendering (bidding) ==
There are various tendering methods in construction industry.

- Open tendering
- Single-stage selective tendering
- Two-stage selective tendering
- Selective tendering for design and builds
- Negotiation
- Joint ventures
- Competitive bidding

=== Open tendering ===
In this method, the client is advertising and inviting the tenders. Any contractor who wishes to quote can submit their offers based on the invitation.

=== Single-stage selective tendering ===
Client is selecting few contractors and inviting them to quote. Contractors are mostly selected based on previous experience or pre-submitted qualifications.

=== Two-stage selective tendering ===
Also called as negotiated tendering. in first stage client is asking pre-selected contractors to submit their pricing parameters, and after that the client will request them to create drawings based on these price levels

=== Selective tendering for design and builds ===
Client is selecting one or few contractors and asking them to submit design and commercial proposal together

=== Negotiation ===
Mostly used for the specialized works such as elevators. Client is regularly working with these types of contractors and they have preferable contractors for these kind of work. Here Contractor is submitting their costs and after that client is negotiating the prices before awarding.

=== Joint ventures ===
JV's are mostly used for complex and large projects.

== Digital procurement ==
The digital procurement method is rapidly emerging. There are various web sites and applications that provide electronic bidding, tender calls, scope work, design bids and related services.

== See also ==
- Construction estimating software
- Presales
- Procurement
