= Schedule of values =

A Schedule of Values (SOV) is a detailed list of how much different tasks are worth in a large project, especially in construction. SOVs are used for billing the client prior to the completion of the overall project to maintain cashflow for the general contractor.

== Calculation ==
apportioning the original contract sum and all change orders, among all cost code divisions or portions of the work. The Schedule of Values shall be based on the approved budget or the approved Fixed Price, or GMP, Cost-Plus Contract type as applicable. See the executed contract agreement for additional language regarding the Schedule of Values. Each Project/Job shall have a separate Schedule of Values. If multiple Projects/Jobs are included in one contract, then the Contractor/Vendor must create a separate Schedule of Values which clearly segregates costs among each Job for billing, reporting and audit purposes."

A template that can be used for a typical SOV is the ConsensusDocs 293 - Schedule of Values. The American Institute of Architects Contract Documents department does not currently publish a standard schedule of values form.

== Usage ==
"For Projects/Jobs with multiple “extra” categories, the Contractor/Vendor must create separate Schedule of Values which clearly segregates costs among each “Extra” category for billing, reporting and audit purposes (breakdown to be determined by Owner.) The Schedule of Values must be approved prior to first Payment Application. Schedule of Values can only be changed with approved Budget Transfer process in project accounting software, or by Change Order. After the Schedule of Values is approved, it becomes the basis for all Contractor/Vendor invoices for hard and soft costs."

When using the Schedule of Values for pay applications the submitter will typically bill on a percentage basis. That is to say that the amount billed that month is __% of the overall line item. This value is then added to the total amount billed from previous pay requests. This total amount would be the total work completed to date. The balance to finish is then calculated by subtracting the total completed to date from the original line item total. The Architect or Owner’s representative will then review and approve the amount due to the contractor during that pay period.
