= Cost escalation =

Cost escalation can be defined as changes in the cost or price of specific goods or services in a given economy over a period. This is similar to the concepts of inflation and deflation except that escalation is specific to an item or class of items (not as general in nature), it is often not primarily driven by changes in the money supply, and it tends to be less sustained. While escalation includes general inflation related to the money supply, it is also driven by changes in technology, practices, and particularly supply-demand imbalances that are specific to a good or service in a given economy. For example, while general inflation (e.g., consumer price index) in the US was less than 5% in the 2003-2007 time period, steel prices increased (escalated) by over 50% because of supply-demand imbalance. Cost escalation may contribute to a project cost overrun but it is not synonymous with it.

Over long periods of time, as market supply and demand imbalances are corrected, escalation will tend to more-or-less equal inflation unless there are sustained technology or efficiency changes in a market.

Escalation is usually calculated by examining the changes in price index measures for a good or service. Future escalation can be forecast using econometrics. Unfortunately, because escalation (unlike inflation) may occur in a micro-market, and it may be hard to measure with surveys, indices can be difficult to find. For example, the Bureau of Labor Statistics has a price index for construction wages and compensation (what the construction contractor's labor cost), but has none for the prices that owners must pay the construction contractor for their services.

In cost engineering and project management usage, escalation and cost contingency are both considered risk funds, that should be included in project estimates and budgets. When escalation is minimal, it is sometimes estimated together with contingency. However, this is not a best practice, particularly when escalation is significant.

== See also ==
- Chemical plant cost indexes
- Price mechanism
- Supply and demand
- Cost estimate
- Economic forecasting
