= Martin Barnes (engineer) =

English civil engineer and project manager (1939–2022)

Nicholas Martin Limer Barnes (18 January 1939 – 5 February 2022) was a noted British civil engineer and project manager

== Life and career ==
Martin Barnes made a significant contribution to the world of engineering and major project delivery. He is credited with being the architect of the New Engineering Contract (NEC) which changed the way in which infrastructure projects were contracted - specifically shifting risks from lower down the supply chain to those most able to manage them ie. the client. It is particularly amusing that he is called the "architect" of the NEC because Barnes always joked that architects were the enemy of good project delivery. He was also the author of the Civil Engineering Standard Method of Measurement - and this and the NEC are still in use today.

He was a founding member of the Association for Project Management (APM) which was founded in 1972. He was APM’s longest-serving president (from 2003 to 2012), chair from 1986 to 1991, and was named an Honorary Fellow in 1995.

He joined the Major Projects Association as Executive Director in 1997 and remained in post until 2006 when he stepped down from the role; rejoining as a non-executive Director in 2008 and remaining on the Board until 2011. During that time he turned the Association into a well-respected voice in the global major projects arena.

From 2008 he chaired an independent dispute avoidance panel set up to avert contractual disputes on work to build facilities for the 2012 London Olympic Games.

Barnes died on 5 February 2022, at the age of 83.

== Achievements ==
The project management triangle

However, the project management triangle is considered insufficient by some writers as a model of project success, because it omits crucial dimensions of success including impact on stakeholders, learning, and user satisfaction. Subsequently, several enhancements of the basic triple constraints have been proposed such as the diamond framework, the pyramid model, six or multiple constraints and the theory of constraints.

Peter Higgins, Chair of the NEC Contract Board, recalls that he was "immediately struck by Martin’s depth of knowledge and commitment to developing a better way of contracting – through collaboration".

The former "NEC awards", awarded in 7 categories which aim to "recognise excellence in project delivery and showcase examples of good practice through collaboration from across the world", were renamed as the "Martin Barnes Awards" in 2022.
