= American Society of Professional Estimators =

The American Society of Professional Estimators (ASPE) was founded in 1956 by about 20 cost estimators in Los Angeles, California.

== Members ==
In 1974, there were 10 chapters totalling 600 members. By 1977, there were 23 chapters totalling 1500 members. The society's web page states that there are thousands of members in 65 chapters across the US. The society does not publish the exact number of members, but an estimate from observation in 2012 is approximately 3000. A published goal for 2012 was to have 3500 members.

== Activities ==
ASPE offers a professional certification for building estimators named Certified Professional Estimator, or CPE. This program began in 1976, when 233 CPEs were awarded in 11 of the then 16 divisions of building construction defined by the Construction Specifications Institute in their MasterFormat system.

== Publication ==
ASPE is the publisher of Estimating Today, a periodical technical journal.

They also publish an estimating manual named Standard Estimating Practice.
