= Basis of estimate =

Basis of estimate (BOE) is a tool used in the field of project management by which members of the project team, usually estimators, project managers, or cost analysts, calculate the total cost of the project. Through carefully planned equations, hierarchical listing of elements, standard calculations, checklists of project elements and other methods, the project team adds in all expenses of a project, from labor to materials to administrative costs. These calculations formulate a Basis of Estimate which is, when completed, a number that can be used to determine the ability of the firm or company to carry out the project, or used as a tool in competing for a contract bid or otherwise proposing the project to another.

== Definition ==
A basis of estimate is an analyzed and carefully calculated number that can be used for proposals, bidding on government contracts, and executing a project with a fully calculated budget. The BOE is a tool, not just a simple calculation, it is created through careful analysis and intricate calculations that create a specific number that can be used to base the project execution on with complete confidence as well as win over a contract.

=== Uses ===
The total number, as well as the smaller numbers for various elements within a project, can be used for managing a project team, determining the team's efficiency, and ensuring that the project is not wasting materials and budget unnecessarily.

The BOE can be used to ensure financial stability of a company. Through accurate budgeting and proper calculations, all projects, regardless of size and scope, can incorporate a BOE. Through the incorporation of this essential tool, a company's financial budget can run effectively and smoothly based on fine-tuned calculations.

Furthermore, BOEs are used within the realm of government contracting and management. While most often used in defense contracting, the BOE can be used in any department of the federal government. Within the United States Department of Defense (DoD), the BOEs presented and accepted are all regulated by the Defense Contract Audit Agency (DCAA) and the Defense Contract Management Agency (DCMA). These agencies monitor all BOEs that are presented and accepted by the DoD and scrutinize them to ensure maximum efficiency by the companies winning the government contracts.

=== Earned Value Management ===
Earned Value Management is a second tool within project management that allows for the tracking of progress throughout the life cycle of a project. BOEs, when executed properly and with the aid of certain software packages, allow for a seamless transition from project proposal to execution by transferring data from the BOE directly into processing it through Earned Value Management and various software programs associated with that.

Experienced Program Managers are trained to develop and implement EVMS programs for organizations requiring them as a result of their US Government contractual requirements. EVMS is required for projects exceeding a certain dollar threshold per ANSI EIA 748 (See Earned Value Management). Programs below the required threshold may still implement EVMS; however, they must do so prudently to obtain the optimum benefit from its employ. Trained Program Managers will have the requisite skills to assist organizations who wish to track progress via EVMS, even when their contracts or programs do not require it.

== Tools ==
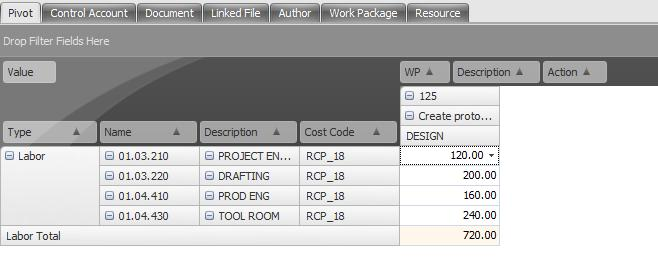
A pivot table in BOEMax, a Basis of Estimate software package.

Over the past few decades, companies created BOEs by using spreadsheet programs and cost analysts to enter thousands of lines of data and create complex algorithms to calculate costs. These positions require a high level of skill to ensure accuracy and knowledge of using these programs.

In recent times, software companies have begun releasing specific software designed to create a BOE with much less effort and time and expense of labor, which ultimately is the goal of a BOE in the first place. These software programs allow members of the project team to form the calculations and input data and create a final number with much less effort, as the process is streamlined and much of the work is done by the internal software programming. The software comes with algorithms and equations that are common to fields of industry and therefore enables the users to simply select the equation and run the analysis without needing to recreate the equations every time.

These software packages also enable the government agencies, or those that the company is reporting to or bidding with, to analyze the BOE more efficiently through pivot tables and other more streamlined features, including standardized reports and consistent reporting visuals.
