= Total delivery cost =

Total Delivered Cost (TDC) is the amount of money it takes for a company to manufacture and deliver a product. Its components are:

- Total Manufacturing Cost: Costs incurred up to and inclusive of the production of finished and wrapped pallets or unit loads, fit for introduction into the warehousing and distribution chain.
- Product Supply Non-Manufacturing Expense: Administrative and developmental costs associated with the purchase of materials, engineering, design of a plant worthy production process, and administrative costs required to manage it.
- Finished Product Logistics Costs: Costs incurred from the entry of finished, wrapped pallets, or unit loads to the warehousing and distribution chain, until delivery of cases to the customer's receiving dock.
