= Chemical plant cost indexes =

Chemical plant cost indexes are dimensionless numbers employed to updating capital cost required to erect a chemical plant from a past date to a later time, following changes in the value of money due to inflation and deflation. Since, at any given time, the number of chemical plants is insufficient to use in a preliminary or predesign estimate, cost indexes are handy for a series of management purposes, like long-range planning, budgeting and escalating or de-escalating contract costs.

A cost index is the ratio of the actual price in a time period compared to that in a selected base period (a defined point in time or the average price in a certain year), multiplied by 100. Raw materials, products and energy prices, labor and construction costs change at different rates, and plant construction cost indexes are actually a composite, able to compare generic chemical plants capital costs.

== Calculations methods ==
Although the available indexes are compiled in several ways, they are defined to encompass a specific set of conditions and items. Prices for these items can be obtained either through company’s purchasing department data or through published indexes, like those published by the Bureau of Labor Statistics (BLS). Both the CE and the IC indexes, from Chemical Engineering and Intratec, respectively, employs BLS’ data.

The weighting of such factors, which is defined by the realized degree of importance of each component in the specific index (or sub-index), aims to represent the costs variations typically found for chemical plants.

== Using a cost index ==
To update an item cost (equipment, projects) from period A to period B, is necessary to multiply period A’s cost by the ratio of period B’s index over period A’s index, according to the following equation:

$\text{Cost at B} = \text{Cost at A}\cdot \frac{\text{index at B }}{\text{index at A }}$

As a rule-of-thumb, cost indexes permit fairly accurate estimates for cost escalation if the difference between period A and period B is less than 10 years. Differences between the actual equipment and labor prices and those predicted by the index tend to grow over the years, surpassing the typical error verified in budget-level estimates.

== Cost indexes in engineering ==
The selection of the proper index to use depends on the industry in which it is applied. For example, while CE, M&S or IC Index are typically employed for chemical process industries, the ENR (Engineering News-Record) construction index is used for general industrial construction and takes in account the prices for fixed amounts of structural steel, cement, lumber and labor.

The majority of cost indexes demonstrate a time lag, due to data collection and its compilation for publishing. As stated before, some indexes use information published by other organizations and a delay in data may be verified (like those provide by the BLS). Exceptions to this are the ENR construction and the IC indexes, which present relatively current values.

The main indexes available for process industries include:

- Chemical Engineering Index, CE: composed of 4 major components – for equipment and other bulk items, the others relevant to construction labor, buildings, and engineering and supervision – the index is employed primary as a process plant construction index, was established using a base period of 1957-1959 as 100. The CE Index is updated monthly and it lags in time by about 3 months. The CE Index was revised in 1982, to account for changes in labor productivity and, again, in 2002. Published in each issue of Chemical Engineering.
- Marshall and Swift Cost Index, M&S (originally known as Marshall and Stevens Index): a composite of two major components - process-industry equipment average and all-industry equipment average - was established in 1926 with a value of 100. Some industries considered in the process-industry equipment average are chemicals, petroleum products, rubber and paper. The all-industry average encompasses 47 different types of industrial, commercial and housing equipment. Published monthly in each issue of Chemical Engineering until April 2012.
- Intratec Chemical Plant Construction Index, IC: a process plant construction index developed by Intratec, a chemical consulting company. Although cost indexes do not usually forecast future escalation, the IC Index stands out for presenting a smaller delay between release date and index date, besides a 12 months forecast. On the other hand, the index is only available from January 2000 (with a value of 100). A sample is available at Intratec’s website.
- Nelson-Farrar Indexes, NF (originally known as the Nelson Refinery Construction Indexes): established in 1946 with a value of 100, the index is more suitable for petroleum or petrochemical business. Published once a month in the Oil and Gas Journal.

== Cost Indexes for different locations ==
The standard indexes available are usually restricted to a particular region, as in the case of NF Index, which is accurate only to the region of the US Gulf coast (USGC). Likewise most of the data available for plant and equipment costs are mostly either in

1. US Gulf Coast Basis (USGC)
2. Northwest Europe Basis (NWE)

Hence the Index values cannot be used to get accurate results in other regions of the world. This variation might be due various factors such as

- Cost and availability of materials
- Cost and availability of labor
- Cost of transportation of equipment and labor
- Import duties and local taxes
- Currency exchange rates

Of all these factors currency exchange rates is said to have the greatest impact in the variation of results.

Before 2012, cost indexes for international locations have been published in "Process Engineering" journal as well as in the "International Journal of Production Economics" (formerly "Engineering Costs and Production Economics").

== Location Factor ==
In order to be able to use the available standard indexes to locations where index data is not available we have to incorporate a new term called the Location Factor (LF) to the standard index value. It is a dimensionless value for a particular location relative to either of the above-mentioned basis.

Cost in A = Cost in USGC x LF(A)

where A is the location for which cost is being evaluated and LF(A) is the location factor for the location A relative to USGC

Location factors are greatly influenced by currency exchange rates due to their significant effect on Index value and hence vary drastically with time. Over the past couple of decades the location factors for various locations are trending close to the value 1. However location factor for a particular region within a country can be easily determined by adding 10% to the index of the reference location for every 1000 miles. The reference location is usually a major industrial location closest to the location where the index is being determined. Location factors for various locations have been published and updated in various journals as in Aspen Richardson's "International Construction Cost Factor Location Manual (2003)".
