= Building estimator =

A building estimator or cost estimator is an individual that quantifies the materials, labor, and equipment needed to complete a construction project. Building cost estimating can concern diverse forms of construction from residential properties to hi-rise and civil works. Both estimators and quantity surveyors must have a background education in the construction industry. Representative professional bodies which regulate property professionals:

- Entry to membership of the Royal Institution of Chartered Surveyors (United Kingdom) is via four main routes: academic, graduate, technical, and senior professional and has links with a number of universities worldwide, with whom they have accredited approved courses.
- The American Society of Professional Estimators - a non profit association which promotes construction estimating as a professional field of endeavor. Professional estimators use Construction Estimating Software.
- The Consulting Estimator Forum is a non profit group which promotes professional construction bidding and estimating practices. Professional estimators use Construction Estimating Software.

== See also ==
- AACE International
- Construction Estimating Software
- Cost engineering
- List of construction occupations
