= Manufacturing cost =

Sum of costs when making a product

Manufacturing cost is the sum of costs of all resources consumed in the process of making a product. The manufacturing cost is classified into three categories: direct materials cost, direct labor cost and manufacturing overhead. It is a factor in total delivery cost.

== Direct materials cost ==
Direct materials are the raw materials that become a part of the finished product. Manufacturing adds value to raw materials by applying a chain of operations to maintain a deliverable product. There are many operations that can be applied to raw materials such as welding, cutting and painting. It is important to differentiate between direct materials and indirect materials.

== Direct labour cost ==
The direct labour cost is the cost of workers who can be easily identified with the unit of production. Types of labour who are considered to be part of the direct labour cost are the assembly workers on an assembly line.

== Manufacturing overhead ==
Manufacturing overhead refers to all manufacturing expenses that are not classified as direct materials or direct labor. It encompasses all costs that support the production process.

=== Manufacturing overhead includes ===
1. Indirect labour cost: The indirect labour cost is the cost associated with workers, such as supervisors and material handling team, who are not directly involved in the production.
2. Indirect materials cost: Indirect materials cost is the cost associated with consumables, such as lubricants, grease, and water, that are not used as raw materials.
3. Other indirect manufacturing cost: includes machine depreciation, land rent, property insurance, electricity, freight and transportation, or any expenses that keep the factory operating.
