= Takeoff (construction) =

Takeoff is a term used in construction to refer to generating a detailed list of materials and quantities required to complete a project. There are two variants of the term. Quantity takeoff (QTO) refers to a detailed measurement of materials and labor needed to complete a construction project. Material takeoff (MTO) refers to a list of materials with quantities and types (such as specific grades of steel) that are required to build a designed structure or item. Material takeoff identifies, lists and quantifies the raw materials needed for a project, while quantity takeoff is a broader analysis including not just materials but also labor and equipment.

== Material takeoff ==
Material takeoff is generated by analysis of a blueprint or other design document. The list of required materials for construction is sometimes referred to as the material takeoff list (MTOL).

Material take off is not limited to the amount of required material, but also the weight of the items taken off. This is important when dealing with larger structures, allowing the company that does the take off to determine total weight of the item and how best to move the item (if necessary) when construction is completed. MTO is not to be confused with bill of materials, more commonly used in a manufacturing context.

Takeoff services have been credited with minimizing waste, optimizing procurement chains, and controlling costs.

== Quantity takeoff ==
Quantity takeoffs are developed by an estimator during the pre-construction phase. This process includes breaking the project down into smaller and more manageable units that are easier to measure or estimate. The level of detail required for measurement may vary. These measurements are used to format a bid on the scope of construction. Estimators review drawings, specifications and models to find these quantities. Experienced estimators have developed procedures to help them quantify their work. Many programs have been developed to aid in the efficiency of these processes. With BIM quantity take-off can be conducted almost automatically given that the type of materials, their quantity and price is included in the model. It is known that construction projects often run overtime and over budget and one of the reasons is lack of accuracy in quantity takeoff and estimates.

== Sources ==
- Eastman, Charles; Teicholz, Paul; Sacks, Rafael; Liston, Kathleen (2011-03-25). BIM Handbook: A Guide to Building Information Modeling for Owners, Managers, Designers, Engineers and Contractors. John Wiley & Sons. ISBN 978-1-118-02169-9.
