= New Engineering Contract =

System that guides the drafting of documents

NEC Contracts logo

The New Engineering Contract (NEC), or NEC Engineering and Construction Contract, is a formalised system created by the UK Institution of Civil Engineers that guides the drafting of documents on civil engineering, construction and maintenance projects for the purpose of obtaining tenders, awarding and administering contracts. NEC has become the default suite of contracts for public-sector works, services and supplies in the United Kingdom and Hong Kong. NEC contracts have also been successfully used in Australia, Ireland, the Netherlands, New Zealand, Peru, the Philippines, South Africa, UAE, and many more. They are also increasingly being used in the private sector.

There have been four editions, the first in 1993, the second in 1995, the third in 2005 and the most recent in 2017. The NEC3 was launched in 2005 and it was amended in April 2013. The NEC Users' Group, with over 400 members worldwide, brings together organisations and individual users of the NEC contract suite to exchange knowledge and best practice.

== History ==
Originally contracts in the civil engineering and construction industries were bespoke and drafted by Chancery pleaders using their knowledge of leases rather than building processes. In 1879, Royal Institute of British Architects for construction projects created RIBA forms which lead to the Joint Contracts Tribunal, JCT forms. For civil engineering the need for a formalized approach to contracts led the Institution of Civil Engineers (ICE) to produce a formalised set of conditions of contract. In 1986, the ICE commissioned the development of a new form of contract as it was felt that there was a need for a form that had clearer language, clearer allocation of responsibilities and reduced opportunities for contractual “gamesmanship”. In 1991, this resulted in a consultative form of the New Engineering Contract form of contract. The first edition was published in 1993. Wider use of the NEC was recommended by the Latham Report in 1994.

NEC's history started in 1986 when Martin Barnes was commissioned to start drafting a contract to stimulate good project management. The first edition of NEC was launched in 1993. NEC2 arrived two years later, in 1995. NEC2 was used to build the High Speed 1 railway, between London and the Channel Tunnel.

NEC is a division of Thomas Telford Ltd, the commercial arm of the ICE.

=== NEC3 ===
The NEC3 suite was launched in 2005 and it was fully revised in 2013 - NEC's 20th anniversary. This suite was used in projects such as Crossrail, London 2012 Olympic and Paralympic games, Halley VI in Antarctica, and the Tin Shui Wai Hospital in Hong Kong. NEC3 was endorsed by the Construction Clients' Board (formerly Public Sector Construction Clients' Forum), Crown Commercial Services, the Facilities Management Board of the UK Cabinet Office, the South African Construction Industry Development Board, the International Organization for Standardization (ISO), the Association for Project Management (APM) and the British Institute of Facilities Management (BIFM).

The Hong Kong government decided to use NEC3 contracts generally for all government projects tendered in 2015/16. After a series of successful NEC3 projects in the region, the Hong Kong government announced in November 2016 that the NEC contract suite would be used for all future public works projects as far as practicable. Since 2017, Hong Kong has progressively moved to adopt NEC4.

=== NEC4 ===
NEC4 was announced in March 2017 and has been available since June 2017. This new edition reflects procurement and project management developments and emerging best practice, with improvements in flexibility, clarity and the ease of administration. It also introduced two new contracts: the NEC4 Design, Build and Operate Contract (DBO) and the NEC4 Alliance Contract (ALC). An NEC4 contract suite covering facilities management was released in 2021.

Several changes to terminology were introduced in NEC4, for example:

- The term "Employer" was replaced with "Client"
- "Scope" was used in place of "Works Information"
- The term "Risk Register" was replaced with "Early Warning Register".

One former NEC3 clause which dealt with the "spirit" of the contract was divided into two clauses, to show that both aspects should be complied with:

- Clause 10.1: the parties and the service manager act as stated in the contract
- Clause 10.2: the parties and the service manager act in a spirit of mutual trust and cooperation.

== Characteristics ==
The NEC is a family of standard contracts, each of which stimulate good management of the relationship between the two parties to the contract and, hence, of the work included in the contract, can be used in a wide variety of commercial situations, for a wide variety of types of work and in any location, and are clear and simple documents using language and a structure which are straightforward and easily understood. The contracts legally define the responsibilities and duties of Employers (the party which commissions the work) and Contractors (the party which carries out the work) in the works information. The contract consists of two key parts, divided between contract data provided by the Employer and that provided by the Contractor. The NEC3 complies fully with the Achieving Excellence in Construction (AEC) principles. The Efficiency and Reform Group of the UK Cabinet Office recommends the use of NEC contracts by public sector construction procurers on construction projects.

NEC documents use some of their own terminology in a specific manner, for example "compensation event" is a term used to encompass variations, losses and expenses, and extensions of time. The term implies that in some situations the contractor will be "compensated" with additional payment, e.g. for additional expenses incurred as a result of client actions, but financial compensation may not always arise and in some cases variations will result in a cost saving.

== Contract family ==
The NEC contracts now form a suite of contracts, with NEC being the brand name for the "family" of contracts. When it was first launched in 1993, it was simply the "New Engineering Contract". This specific contract has been renamed the "Engineering and Construction Contract" which is the main contract used for any construction based project. It now sits alongside a number of other contracts, making the NEC suite suitable for use in many stages of the lifecycle of a project and for any party within a project. The contracts available within the suite are:

Engineering and Construction Contract (ECC):

Suitable for any construction based contract between an Employer and a Contractor. It is intended to be suitable for any sector of the industry, including civil, building, nuclear, oil and gas, etc. Within the ECC contract there are six family level options, from which the Employer is to choose the most suitable and offer the best option/value for money on that project:

- Option A: Priced contract with activity schedule
- Option B: Priced contract with bill of quantities
- Option C: Target contract with activity schedule
- Option D: Target contract with bill of quantities
- Option E: Cost-reimbursable contract
- Option F: Management contract

These options offer a framework for tender and contract clauses that differ primarily in regard to the mechanisms by which the contractor is paid and how risk is allocated and motivated to control costs.

The core clauses (of the main option listed above) are used in conjunction with the secondary options and the additional conditions of contract.

The clauses of these options have been be adapted for simpler less risky work (short contracts), for use as subcontracts, and for professional services such as design as below.

The Engineering and Construction Subcontract Contract (ECS)

Very similar in detail and complexity of contractual requirements to the ECC contract above, but allows the contractor to sub-let the project to a subcontractor imposing most of the clauses that she/he has within her/his headline contract. There is very little difference between the ECC and the ECS, other than the names of the parties are changed (contractor and subcontractor) and some of the timescales for contractual responses are altered to take into account the timescales required in the ECC contract.

The Engineering and Construction Short Contract (ECSC)

This is an abbreviated version of the ECC contract and most suitable when the contract is considered "low risk" (not necessarily low value) on a project with little change expected. This contract is still between the employer and contractor but does not use all of the processes of the ECC making it simpler and easier to manage and administer.

The Engineering and Construction Short Subcontract (ECSS)

Allows the contractor to sub-let a simpler lower risk contract down the line to a subcontractor. It is back-to-back with the ECSC but is frequently used as subcontract when the main contract is under the ECS.

The Professional Services Contract (PSC)

This contract is for anyone providing a service, rather than undertaking any physical construction works. Designers are the most obvious party to fit into this category. Whilst they are producing a design for an employer or contractor, they would sign up and follow the clauses within the PSC. Most of the clauses within this contract are the same or similar to those in the main ECC contract, so that all contractors, designers and subcontractors have broadly the same obligations and processes to follow as each other. The PSC can be used in a wide variety of situations with relatively little change required.

As with the ECC contract, there are several main options:

- Option A: Priced contract with activity schedule
- Option C: Target contract
- Option E: Time based contract
- Option G: Term contract.

Options B, D and F do not exist.

The Professional Services Short Contract (PSSC)

This was added to the family in April 2013 and was co-developed with the Association for Project Management. It is for simpler less complex assignments than the PSC, such as the appointment of small team for managing an ECC contract on the Employer's behalf. E.g. the Project Manager and Supervisor. It is frequently used as a subcontract to the PSC for design work.

Framework Contract (FC)

Parties enter into a "framework" of which work packages will then be let during the life of that framework. Any individual projects will then be awarded using one of the other contracts within the suite, meaning that the parties follow the headline clauses within the framework contract (which is a fairly slim contract) and then the individual clauses within the chosen contract for that package. Different work packages can be let using different contracts during the life of the framework.

Term Service Contract (TSC)

For parties on a project that is operational or maintenance based, e.g. maintaining highway signage, where the contract is to ensure that a certain standard is maintained. This contract is not generally used for constructing new works, but can include some amount of betterment. There is also a "Term Service Short Contract" where the project is a relatively low risk project and/or the work is primarily re-active. It is an abbreviated version of the main TSC.

Supply Contract/Short Supply Contract (SC/SSC)

These contracts were launched in 2010. This is for a supplier of supplies or goods to a project, and puts extra contractual requirements on them during their procurement/manufacture period. The Supply Contract is for big bespoke items i.e. designed and manufactured specifically for that contract, with the Short Supply Contract potentially being for more run of the mill / commoditised items on a project. Neither of these contracts cover working on a site as they are not written as 'supply and install' contracts.

Dispute Resolution Services Contract (DRSC) - previously Adjudicator's Contract

If there is a dispute between the parties on a project, the Adjudicator will follow the clauses within this contract in order to come to a decision.

Design Build and Operate (DBO)

The NEC4 Design, Build and Operate Contract (DBO) allows the procurement of a more integrated whole-life delivery solution. It combines responsibility for design, construction, operation and/or maintenance, procured from a single supplier.

It can include a range of different services to be provided before, during and after engineering and construction works are completed.

Alliance Contract (ALC)

The NEC4 Alliance Contract (ALC), published initially in a consultative format, was created to support clients who wish to take a step forward by fully integrating the delivery team for large complex projects.

The ALC should be used to engage in a single collaborative contract with a number of participants in order to deliver a project or programme of work. The basis of the contract will be that all parties work together in achieving client objectives, and share in the risks and benefits of doing so.

Facilities Management contract suite

The NEC4 FMC suite includes the Facilities Management contract (FMC), subcontract (FMS), short contract (FMSC) and short subcontract (FMSS).

Guidance Notes and Flowcharts

Each of the different contracts listed above comes with its own set of guidance notes and flowcharts which should aid understanding of the intent of the drafted clauses. The guidance notes expand on each clause to give extra substance and intent of the original drafters as to how a clause should be understood and interpreted. The flowcharts then map out each of the main processes within each contract and demonstrate how it should operate and what to do next if a party has or has not carried out the next contractual action.

== Comparison ==
The following demonstrates the differing approaches to drafting in the NEC and ICE forms of contract using the illustration of circumstances when the contractor is entitled to additional time and cost for physical conditions:

NEC Engineering and Construction Contract Second Edition Clause 60.1 (12)

The Contractor encounters physical conditions which are within the site, are not weather conditions and which an experienced contractor would have judged at the contract date to have such a small chance of occurring that it would have been unreasonable for her/him to have allowed for them.

ICE Conditions of Contract Sixth Edition Clause 12(1)

If during the execution of the Works the Contractor shall encounter physical conditions (other than weather conditions or conditions due to weather conditions) or artificial obstructions which conditions or obstructions could not in her/his opinion reasonably have been foreseen by an experienced contractor the Contractor shall as early as practicable give written notice thereof to the Engineer.

== Z clauses ==
Employers often use additional conditions of contract ("Z clauses") to amend or delete contract provisions relating to certain obligations, and the Efficiency and Reform Group of the Cabinet Office in the UK (formerly the OGC) has published generic public sector Z clauses for use with NEC contracts. A standard Z clause relating to fair payment for sub-contractors (often labelled "Z5") was recommended for public sector use in 2011, and additional public sector Z clauses were later published to reflect the contract termination provisions and other requirements of the Public Contracts Regulations 2015.

Excessive use of Z clauses has been criticised as "onerous" and "poorly drafted"; NEC guidance states that "additional conditions should be used only when absolutely necessary to accommodate special needs".

== Guidance notes and further information ==
Guidance notes and flow charts are published by the ICE, which are supplemented by the frequently asked questions sections of the NEC website. Prospective users of the NEC3 contract are encouraged to study the FAQ's in order to avoid unintended contract provisions. The often unintended Option C scenario where a Contractor is paid monies in excess of the Target Cost plus maximum share provisions is specifically not addressed in the guidance notes or frequently asked questions. Other common misinterpretations are minutes of meetings as communications, deleted work and paying for correcting defects.
