= Quantity surveyor =

Profession in the building trade

In the construction industry, a quantity surveyor (QS) is a professional with expert knowledge of construction costs and contracting. Qualified professional quantity surveyors can be known as Chartered Surveyors (Members and Fellows of RICS) in the UK and Certified Quantity Surveyors (a designation of the Australian Institute of Quantity Surveyors) in Australia and other countries. In some countries, including Canada, South Africa, Kenya and Mauritius, qualified quantity surveyors are known as Professional Quantity Surveyors, a title protected by law.

Quantity surveyors are responsible for managing all aspects of the contractual and financial side of construction projects. They help to ensure that the construction project is completed within its projected budget. Quantity surveyors are also hired by contractors to help with the valuation of construction work for the contractor, help with bidding and project budgeting, and the submission of bills to the client.

== Duties ==
The duties of a quantity surveyor are as follows:

- Conducting financial feasibility studies for development projects.
- Cost estimate, cost planning and cost management.
- Analyzing terms and conditions in the contract.
- Predicting potential risks in the project and taking precautions to mitigate such.
- Forecasting the costs of different materials needed for the project.
- Prepare tender documents, contracts, budgets and other documentation.
- Take note of changes made and adjusting the budget accordingly.
- Tender management including preparation of bills of quantities, contract conditions and assembly of tender documents
- Contract management and contractual advice
- Valuation of construction work
- Claims and dispute management
- Life-cycle cost analysis
- Reinstatement cost assessment for insurance purposes.

== Qualification ==
A university degree or diploma alone does not allow one to register as a Chartered Quantity Surveyor. Usually, anyone looking to qualify as a Chartered Quantity Surveyor, Certified Quantity Surveyor must hold appropriate educational qualifications and work experience, and must pass a professional competence assessment.

The RICS requires an RICS approved degree, several years of practical experience, and passing the Assessment of Professional Competence (APC) to qualify as a Chartered Quantity Surveyor. Some candidates may be entitled to qualify through extensive experience and reciprocity agreements.

== Professional associations ==
- The Royal Institution of Chartered Surveyors (RICS)
- AIQS – Australian Institute of Quantity Surveyors
- IQSSL - Institute of Quantity Surveyors Sri Lanka
- ASAQS – Association of South African Quantity Surveyors
- BSIJ – Building Surveyors Institute of Japan
- Chartered Institution of Civil Engineering Surveyors (CICES) – Professional surveying organisation
- CIQS – Canadian Institute of Quantity Surveyors
- CCEA - China Cost Engineering Association
- GHIS - Ghana Institute of Surveyors
- HKIS – Hong Kong Institute of Surveyors
- IIQS – Indian Institute of Quantity Surveyors
- IQSI – Ikatan Quantity Surveyor Indonesia
- IQSK – Institute of Quantity Surveyors of Kenya
- JIQS – Jamaican Institute of Quantity Surveyors
- NIQS – Nigerian Institute of Quantity Surveyors
- NZIQS – New Zealand Institute of Quantity Surveyors
- PICQS – Philippine Institute of Certified Quantity Surveyors
- RISM – The Royal Institution of Surveyors Malaysia
- SISV – Singapore Institute of Surveyors and Valuers
- SCSI – Society of Chartered Surveyors Ireland
- SACQSP – South African Council for Quantity Surveying Profession
- QSI - Quantity Surveyor International
- UNTEC - Union nationale des Économistes de la construction (France)

== See also ==
- Cost engineering
