= Bill of quantities =

Document used in tendering in the construction industry

A bill of quantities is a document used in tendering in the construction industry in which materials, parts, and labor (and their costs) are itemized. It also (ideally) details the terms and conditions of the construction or repair contract and itemizes all work to enable a contractor to price the work for which he or she is bidding. The quantities may be measured in number, area, volume, weight or time. Preparing a bill of quantities requires that the design is complete and a specification has been prepared.

The bill of quantities is issued to tenderers for them to prepare a price for carrying out the construction work. The bill of quantities assists tenderers in the calculation of construction costs for their tender, and, as it means all tendering contractors will be pricing the same quantities (rather than taking-off quantities from the drawings and specifications themselves), it also provides a fair and accurate system for tendering.

== Creation ==
Bill of quantities are prepared by quantity surveyors and building estimators, and "Indeed the bill of quantities was the raison d'être for the development of quantity surveying as a separate profession."

The practice historically of estimating building costs in this way arose from non-contractual measurements, taken off drawings to assist tenderers in quoting lump sum prices.

There are different styles of bills of quantities, mainly the elemental bill of quantities and trade bills

== Contingency sum ==
A contingency sum is an item found within a bill of quantities.

The item refers to unforeseeable cost likely to be incurred during the contracts.

There are two types of contingency sum. The first refers to a specific item, e.g., "additional alterations to services when installing said shower unit", where an item for alterations to existing services is not contained within the bill of quantities but some work is envisaged.

The second type of sum is where money can be allocated to any item, within the bill of quantities, in the same way as the above example or used as "additional work to be undertaken by the contractor, at the request of the contract administrator".

The first is usually approximated by the client’s PQS and the second by the contractors QS (or commercial manager).

== See also ==
- Bill of materials
- Operational bills

== Books ==
- Seeley IH. (1998). Building Quantities Explained 5th Revised edition, Macmillan ISBN 978-0-333-71972-5
- Seeley IH. (1997). Quantity Surveying Practice, 2nd Revised Macmillan; ISBN 978-0-333-68907-3
- Lee S. Trench W. Willis A. (2005) Elements of Quantity Surveying. 10th Edition WileyBlackwell; ISBN 978-1-4051-2563-5
- Ashworth A. Hogg K. (2007). Willis’s Elements of Quantity Surveying 12 Rev Ed edition Blackwell Publishing. ISBN 978-1-4051-4578-7
