= Ryan Companies =

Building and development company based in Minneapolis

Coordinates: 44.977310°N 93.261015°W

Ryan Companies US, Inc.
- Company type: Private
- Industry: Construction Management, General Contracting, Real Estate Development, Mixed-use development
- Founded: 1938
- Founder: James Henry Ryan
- Headquarters: 533 South 3rd Street, Suite 100, Minneapolis, Minnesota
- Number of locations: 17 offices
- Area served: United States
- Key people: Brian Murray (CEO); Mike McElroy (President & CIO); Collin Barr (President, Southern & Western Divisions); Lisa Kro (CFO & Administrative Officer); Mike Ryan (President, Northern Division); Paul Springthorpe (COO)
- Products: Healthcare, Industrial, Retail, Senior Living, Multifamily, Build-to-Suit, Office, Mixed-Use, Hospitality
- Services: Development, Architecture & Engineering, Property Management, Capital Markets, Integrated Project Delivery, Building Information Modeling, Lean Construction, Sustainable Design
- Number of employees: 1800+ (2022)
- Website: www.ryancompanies.com

Ryan Companies US, Inc. (or Ryan or Ryan Companies) is a national builder, developer, designer, and real estate manager based in Minneapolis, Minnesota.

With in-house construction, design, development, capital markets and real estate management, Ryan uses integrated project delivery (IPD) as a preferred method for and delivering design and construction projects and organizing project teams.

== History ==
Ryan Companies was founded in Hibbing, Minnesota, by James Henry Ryan. Forming a partnership with his sons Francis and Russell, James bought the Frederick Lumber Company and renamed it Ryan Lumber and Coal in 1938. In 1949, Russell and Francis formed Ryan Realty Company to own, finance, and manage the real estate Ryan Lumber and Coal built. In 1989, construction, development, capital markets, and real estate management were joined under Ryan Companies.

In 1946, Ryan built their first National Tea Company store, the company's first design-build/development project. Ryan built 60 National stores over its 30-year relationship with the company. The company built its first Target store in Bloomington, Minnesota in 1965, and today, builds stores, distribution centers, data centers, and office buildings for the retailer.

Francis and Russell led the company until 1989 when Russell's son, Jim, became CEO, Pat Ryan became president, and Tim Gray became CFO.

In 2007, Ryan was named the National Association of Industrial and Office Properties’ (NAIOP) Developer of the Year.

Following the Iowa flood of 2008, Ryan's Cedar Rapids office partnered with Mercy Medical Center, one of two Cedar Rapids hospitals, to recover and restore services within a month. building and the Paramount Theatre as well as the construction of a new public library, fire station and animal-control facility.

In 2009, Ryan provided real estate management assignment for Capella Tower, also known as 225 South Sixth Street, located in downtown Minneapolis. This broadened the existing local relationship that ASB Capital Management has with the team of Ryan and CB Richard Ellis (leasing agent) at the AT&T Tower in Minneapolis. Jim Ryan was also awarded the Best in Real Estate Lifetime Achievement Award that year. Pat Ryan, chairman of the board and former president and CEO, was named in Twin City Business "100 Leaders To Know" in November 2014.

Brian Murray took over as CEO in 2018, and he was Ryan's first non-family member to lead the company.

In 2023, Ryan managed construction for public sector projects including: the renovation of the Warren E. Burger Federal Building and US Courthouse in St. Paul, Minnesota, and the construction of the new US Courthouse in Des Moines, Iowa. Ryan provided renderings for the renovation of the Bishop Henry Whipple Federal Building at Fort Snelling, Minnesota and announced that it will manage a 20-year build-to-suit lease for a GSA Professional Office Building in Phoenix, Arizona. Ryan is also constructing, in association with Gilbane, Inc., the Maricopa County Courthouse Tower in downtown Phoenix, Arizona.

== Developments ==
Major projects:

- Downtown East, Minneapolis, Minnesota
- Marina Heights, Tempe, Arizona
- Kirkland Urban, Kirkland, Washington
- Two MarketPointe
- W Minneapolis – The Foshay(Foshay Tower)
- Grain Belt Brewhouse
- The Mosaic Company’s Florida Office Building
- Rosemont Corporate Center — home to Cisco Systems and Delta Dental of Illinois’ corporate headquarters.
- Midtown Exchange (former Lake Street Sears) which included public-private partnership with community groups and the City of Minneapolis.

Projects in construction:

- Twin Cities Assembly Plant redevelopment as Highland Bridge in Saint Paul, Minnesota
- UniSource Energy Corporation's corporate headquarters
- W. L. Gore and Associates Biomedical Manufacturing Campus.

Real estate management:

- Portfolio for Sumitomo Corporation of America, which includes Miami Center, 123 Mission Street, 1750 K Street and Hayden Ferry Lakeside.

== Operations ==
More than 5,100,000 labor-hours were worked on Ryan jobsites in 2009. According to the US Bureau of Labor Statistics, Ryan's lost-time injury rate is 1/10 of the industry average. Ryan works with the Occupational Safety and Health Administration and recently entered into a safety partnership with OSHA, Wisconsin. Ryan's current workers’ compensation moderation rate is .75.

In addition to working with communities on construction and development projects, the company contributes to communities through the Ryan Foundation. In addition to funding projects Ryan owners want to support, such as the Cristo Rey Jesuit High School Twin Cities/Colin Powell Youth Leadership Center and the YMCA at Kelly Hall, the Foundation provides support dollar-for-dollar for employees’ community support activities.
