= Clint Crisher =

American pop singer and songwriter

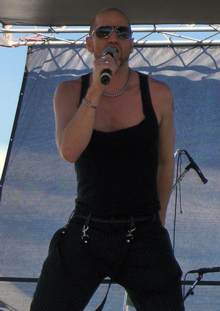
- Crisher performing at the Greater Palm Springs Pride in November 2009

Background information
- Born: Clinton Glen Peacock; January 23, 1973 (age 53) Enterprise, Alabama
- Genres: Pop, R&B, Adult Contemporary
- Years active: 1993–present
- Label: Crisher Entertainment
- Website: clintcrisher.com

Clint Crisher (born January 23, 1973) is an American pop singer and songwriter. He is believed to be the first American R&B or pop singer to be openly gay from the beginning of his career.

== Biography ==
Crisher was born on January 23, 1973, in Enterprise, Alabama, to a Christian family. His mother, Brenda, was of French Canadian descent, and his father, Glen Peacock, is a first-generation Italian American. The Peacock family originated from London, England; his mother worked as a Las Vegas dancer. Crisher was raised in Jacksonville, Florida, by his sister.

== Career ==
After graduating from high school in Fernandina Beach, Florida, Crisher studied at Florida State College at Jacksonville. He transferred colleges and received his BA from Jacksonville University. Living in Washington, DC, Crisher began performing his own original music regularly in local D.C. clubs and events including the Velvet Nation party at Nation, Tracks, Millennium at the 9:30 Club, Ozone, The Capitol Ballroom, and Cobalt and in NYC nightclubs Metronome, Avalon, Splash, Webster Hall, Starlight, and Home. Crisher performed along major DJ's and club promoters saw him and started hiring him for larger performances. His career as a dance performance artist and club personality began in Washington, DC, continued in Miami at Crobar and eventually landed him in Los Angeles. Crisher performed on the main stage with the United States Capitol building in the background for the 1999 and 2003 Capital Pride annual LGBT pride festival in Washington, D.C., with over 150,000 attendees and also in July 2002 Crisher performed as part of the Billboard Dance Music Summit.

== Discography ==
Albums

- 1999: Perfect World
- 2007: Terrific Distraction (Crisher Entertainment)
- 2008: Spotlight "The Remixes" (Crisher Entertainment) 2007 No. 5 Billboard Breakout Hot Dance Club Play November 2007
- 2008: It Can Happen To You "The Remixes"(Crisher Entertainment) #38-week of December 8–14, 2008 on the zipDj TOP 40 Canada National Dance Charts included in industry publication Cashbox
- 2008: The Hot Boys World Volume 1 (Crisher Entertainment)
- 2008: The Hot Boys World Volume 2 (Crisher Entertainment)
- 2009: The Hot Boys World Volume 3 (Crisher Entertainment)
- 2010: TraXXX 123 RemiXed (Crisher Entertainment)
- 2010: The Hot Boys World Volume 4 (Crisher Entertainment)
- 2011: The Hot Boys World Volume 5 (Crisher Entertainment)
- 2011: Sticky Remixes (Crisher Entertainment)

== See also ==
- Youth pride
