= Project delivery method =

Building engineering concept

Project delivery methods defines the characteristics of how a construction project is designed and built and the responsibilities of the parties involved in the construction (owner, designer and contractor). They are used by a construction manager who is working as an agent to the owner or by the owner itself to carry-out a construction project while mitigating the risks to the scope of work, time, budget, quality and safety of the project. These risks ranges from cost overruns, time delays and conflict among the various parties.

== History ==
=== Trends in delivery methods ===
Though DBB is now used for most private projects and the majority of public projects, it has not historically been the predominant delivery method of choice. The master builders of centuries past acted both as designers and constructors for both public and private clients. In the United States, Zane's Post Road in Ohio and the IRT in New York City were both originally developed under more integrated delivery methods, as were most infrastructure projects until 1933. Integrated Project Delivery offers a new delivery method to remove considerable waste from the construction process while improving quality and a return to more collaborative methods from the past. In an effort to assist industry professionals with the selection of appropriate project delivery systems, construction management researchers have prepared a Procurement Method and Contract Selection Model, which can be used for high level decision making for construction projects on a case-by-case basis.

== Types ==
Common project delivery methods include:

=== Design-Bid-Build (DBB) or Design-Award-Build (DAB) ===
In Design-Bid-Build, owner develops contract documents with an architect or an engineer consisting of a set of blueprints and a detailed specification. Bids are solicited from contractors based on these documents; a contract is then awarded to the lowest responsive and responsible bidder. This is the traditional model for public sector infrastructure projects.

==== DBB with Construction Management (DBB with CM) ====
DBB with Construction Management is a modified version of the Design-bid-build approach With partially completed contract documents, an owner will hire a construction manager to act as an agent. As substantial portions of the documents are completed, the construction manager will solicit bids from suitable subcontractors. This allows construction to proceed more quickly and allows the owner to share some of the risk inherent in the project with the construction manager.

=== Design-Build (DB) or Design-Construct (DC) ===
In Design-Build, an owner develops a conceptual plan for a project, then solicits bids from joint ventures of architects and/or engineer and builders for the design and construction of the project. This is an alternative to the traditional model for public infrastructure projects that does not involve Private Financing.

==== Design-Build-Operate-Maintain (DBOM) ====
DBOM takes DB one step further by including the operations and maintenance of the completed project in the same original contract

=== Integrated Project Delivery (IPD) ===
Integrated Project Delivery seeks to involve all participants (people, systems, business structures and practices) through all phases of design, fabrication, and construction, with the goal of improving project efficiency and reducing "waste" in project delivery (i.e. any processes that do no directly add value to the final product). IPD is closely associated with the philosophy of Lean construction.

==== Job Order Contracting (JOC) ====
A form of Integrated Project Delivery (IPD) specifically for repair, renovation, maintenance, sustainability, and "minor" new construction. Each job order contract uses a Unit Price Book for pricing each job via a multi-year umbrella contract.

=== Public-private partnership (PPP, 3P, or P3) ===
A public–private partnership is a cooperative arrangement between one or more public entities (typically the owner) and another (typically private sector) entity to design, build, finance, and at times operate and maintain, the project for a specified period of time on behalf of the owner. A minima, public-private partnership refers to the idea of cooperation between the public sector and the Private sector.

The following models are usually used for P3 projects, though they are also sometimes used for private sector projects.

==== Build-Finance (BF) ====
The private actor builds the asset and finances the cost during the construction period, afterwards the responsibility is handed over to the public entity. In terms of private-sector risk and involvement, this model is again on the lower end of the spectrum for both measures.

==== Build-Operate-Transfer (BOT) ====
Build-Operate-Transfer represents a complete integration of the project delivery: the same contract governs the design, construction, operations, maintenance, and financing of the project. After some concessionary period, the facility is transferred back to the owner.

==== Build–own–operate–transfer (BOOT) ====
A BOOT structure differs from BOT in that the private entity owns the works. During the concession period, the private company owns and operates the facility with the prime goal to recover the costs of investment and maintenance while trying to achieve a higher margin on the project. BOOT has been used in projects like highways, roads mass transit, railway transport and power generation.

==== Build–own–operate (BOO) ====
In a BOO project, ownership of the project remains usually with the project company, such as a mobile phone network. Therefore, the private company gets the benefits of any residual value of the project. This framework is used when the physical life of the project coincides with the concession period. A BOO scheme involves large amounts of finance and long payback period. Some examples of BOO projects come from the water treatment plants.

==== Build–lease–transfer (BLT) ====
Under BLT, a private entity builds a complete project and leases it to the government. In this way the control over the project is transferred from the project owner to a lessee. In other words, the ownership remains by the shareholders but operation purposes are leased. After the expiry of the leasing the ownership of the asset and the operational responsibility is transferred to the government at a previously agreed price.

==== Design-Build-Finance-Maintain (DBFM) ====
"The private sector designs, builds and finances an asset and provides hard facility management or maintenance services under a long-term agreement." The owner (usually the public sector) operates the facility. This model is in the middle of the spectrum for private sector risk and involvement.

==== Design–build–finance–operate-maintain (DBFOM) or Design–build–finance–maintain-operate (DBFMO) ====
Design–build–finance–operate-maintain (DBFOM) also referred to as Design–build–finance–maintain-operate (DBFMO) is a project delivery method very similar to BOOT except that there is no actual ownership transfer. Moreover, the contractor assumes the risk of financing until the end of the contract period. The owner then assumes the responsibility for maintenance and operation. This model is extensively used in specific infrastructure projects such as toll roads. The private construction company is responsible for the design and construction of a piece of infrastructure for the government, which is the true owner. Moreover, the private entity has the responsibility to raise finance during the construction and the exploitation period. Usually, the public sector begins payments to the private sector for use of the asset post-construction. This is the most commonly used model in the EU according to the European Court of Auditors.

==== Design–build–operate–transfer (DBOT) ====
This funding option is common when the client has no knowledge of what the project entails. Hence the project is contracted to a company to design, build, operate, and then transfer it. Examples of such projects are refinery constructions.

==== Design–construct–manage–finance (DCMF) ====
A private entity is entrusted to design, construct, manage, and finance a facility, based on the specifications of the government. Project cash flows result from the government's payment for the rent of the facility. Some examples of the DCMF model are prisons or public hospitals.

== Conceptual differences between delivery methods ==
A graphical representation of the conceptual differences between project delivery methods.

There are two key variables which account for the bulk of the variation between delivery methods:

- The extent of the integration of the various service providers.
- The extent to which the owner is directly financing the project.

When the various service providers are segmented, the owner has the most control, but this control is costly and does not give each provider an incentive to optimize its contribution for the next service. When there is tight integration amongst providers, each step of the delivery is undertaken with future activities in mind, resulting in cost savings, but limiting the owner's influence throughout the project.

The owner's direct financing of a project simply means that the owner directly pays the providers for their services. In the case of a facility with a consistent revenue stream, indirect financing becomes possible: rather than be paid by the owner, the providers are paid with the revenue collected from the facility's operation.

Indirect financing risks being mistaken for privatization. Though the providers do have a concession to operate and collect revenue from a facility that they built and financed, the structure itself remains the property of the owner (usually a government agency in the case of public infrastructure).

=== Level of private involvement ===
Different Levels of Private sector engagement in public project delivery by model
	Identify Infrastructure Need	Propose solution	Project design	Project financing	Construction	Operation	Maintenance	Ownership	Concession?
Bid - build	Public Sector				Private Sector	Public Sector			No
BF (Build finance)	Public Sector			Private Sector		Public Sector			No
BLT (Build–lease–transfer)	Public Sector		Private Sector			Public Sector	Private Sector		Temporary
BOT (Build-operate-transfer)	Public Sector		Private Sector					Public Sector	Temporary
BOO (Build–own–operate)	Public Sector		Private Sector						Yes
BOOT (Build–own–operate–transfer)	Public Sector		Private Sector						Temporary
DB (Design–build)	Public Sector		Private Sector	Public Sector	Private Sector	Public Sector			No
DBB (Design–bid–build)	Public Sector		Private Sector	Public Sector	Private Sector	Public Sector			No
DBF (Design–build–finance)	Public Sector		Private Sector			Public Sector			No
DBFM (Design–build–finance–maintain)	Public Sector		Private Sector			Public Sector	Private Sector	Public Sector	No
DBFO (Design–build–finance–operate)	Public Sector		Private Sector				Public Sector		No
DBFMO (Design–build–finance–maintain–operate)	Public Sector		Private Sector					Public Sector	No
Operation & maintenance contract	Public Sector					Private Sector		Public Sector	No
Market-led Proposals	Private Sector							Public Sector	No
