= Perfect World =

Perfect World or A Perfect World may refer to:

== Film and television ==
- A Perfect World, a 1993 Clint Eastwood film
- Perfect World (film), a 2018 Japanese film by Kenji Shibayama
- Perfect World (TV series), a 2000 British sitcom starring Paul Kaye
- A Perfect World (audio drama), a 2008 audio play based on the TV series Doctor Who
- Perfect World Pictures, a Chinese film and television production company

== Music ==
=== Albums ===
- Perfect World (Clint Crisher album) or the title song, 1999
- Perfect World (Eiko Shimamiya album) or the title song, 2010
- Perfect World (Twice album), 2021
- Perfect World (Uniform album) or the title song, 2015
- Perfect World (Lastlings album) or the title song, 2023
- A Perfect World, by Takida, 2016

=== Songs ===
- "Perfect World" (Broken Bells song), 2014
- "Perfect World" (Marcella Detroit song), 1995
- "Perfect World" (Gossip song), 2012
- "Perfect World" (Huey Lewis and the News song), 1988
- "Perfect World" (Twice song), 2021
- "Perfect World", by Ace of Base from The Bridge, 1995
- "Perfect World", by Anggun from Toujours un ailleurs, 2015
- "Perfect World", by Peter Cetera from Another Perfect World, 2001
- "Perfect World", by Method Man from Tical 2000: Judgement Day, 1998
- "Perfect World", by John Mellencamp from Orpheus Descending, 2023
- "Perfect World", by Liz Phair from whitechocolatespaceegg, 1998
- "Perfect World", by Simple Plan from Still Not Getting Any..., 2003
- "Perfect World", by Steve Miller Band from Wide River, 1993
- "Perfect World", by Sublime from Everything Under the Sun, 2006
- "Perfect World", by Talking Heads from Little Creatures, 1985
- "Perfect World", by Billy Talent from Billy Talent II, 2006

== Video games ==
- Perfect World (video game), a 2005 massively multiplayer online game
- Perfect World (company), a China-based online game company

== Other ==
- Perfect World (Web novel)
- Perfect World (manga), a Japanese manga series

== See also ==
- The Perfect World Foundation, a nature conservation NGO
- In a Perfect World (disambiguation)
- Utopia
