= Rafael Sacks =

Israeli civil-engineering researcher (born 1962)

- Born: July 7, 1962 (age 64); Johannesburg, South Africa
- Citizenship: Israel
- Education: University of the Witwatersrand (BSc); MIT (SM); Technion – Israel Institute of Technology (DSc)
- Known for: Building information modelling (BIM); lean construction; digital-twin construction
- Awards: Thomas Fitch Rowland Prize (2016); Thorpe Medal (2023)
- Scientific career
- Fields: Civil engineering; construction management
- Workplaces: Technion – Israel Institute of Technology; University of Cambridge
- Thesis: Computer-Integrated Planning of Construction Engineering Projects (1998)

Rafael Sacks (born 7 July 1962) is an Israeli civil engineer whose research links building information modelling (BIM) with lean construction and, more recently, with digital-twin construction. He is a full professor in the Faculty of Civil and Environmental Engineering at the Technion – Israel Institute of Technology, Haifa, and since 2020 has headed the Israel National Building Research Institute.

== Early life and education ==
Sacks was born in Johannesburg and moved to Israel in 1984. He earned a BSc in Civil Engineering from the University of the Witwatersrand (1983), an SM in Structural Engineering from the Massachusetts Institute of Technology (1985) and a DSc in Construction Management from the Technion (1998).

== Career ==
After three years in practice and service in the Israel Defense Forces construction unit, Sacks joined Shacham Computerized Engineering Ltd. (1989–1994).

He began studies toward a doctorate at the Technion in 1994, completing in 1997. Before joining the Technion as a tenure track faculty member in 2000, he worked in construction management of residential buildings.

From 2001 to 2003 he was a research scientist under the direction of Prof. Charles Eastman at Georgia Tech. He became a full professor in 2018 and has held visiting posts at the University of Reading, UK, Curtin University in Perth, Australia and at the University of Cambridge, UK. In 2020 he was appointed head of the Israel National Building Research Institute.

== Research ==
Sacks’ work explores how BIM can support production-system design, safety and real-time control on construction sites. He served as scientific director of the EU Horizon-2020 ‘‘BIM2TWIN’’ project, which developed a platform for digital-twin construction. He is lead author of the BIM Handbook, now in its fourth edition (2025), Building Lean, Building BIM (2018) and Twin Systems: Digital Twins of the Built Environment (2024).

== Honours and awards ==
- Thomas Fitch Rowland Prize - American Society of Civil Engineers (2016)
- Thorpe Medal - European Council on Computing in Construction (2023)

== Selected works ==
- Sacks R, G. Lee, L. Burdi & M. Bolpagni, BIM Handbook: A Guide to Building Information Modeling for Owners, Designers, Engineers, Contractors, and Facility Managers (4th ed., Wiley, 2025). ISBN 978-1394222223.
- Sacks, R., Koskela, L., Dave, B. A., & Owen, R. (2010). Interaction of lean and building information modeling in construction. Journal of construction engineering and management, 136(9), 968-980.
- Sacks, R., Perlman, A., & Barak, R. (2013). Construction safety training using immersive virtual reality. Construction management and economics, 31(9), 1005-1017.

== See also ==
- Building information modeling
- Lean construction
