= Halo (bar) =

Gay bar in Washington, D.C., United States

Coordinates: 38.909671°N 77.03339°W

- Interactive map of Halo
- Address: Washington D.C. United States
- Type: Gay bar

Construction
- Opened: 2004
- Closed: 2010

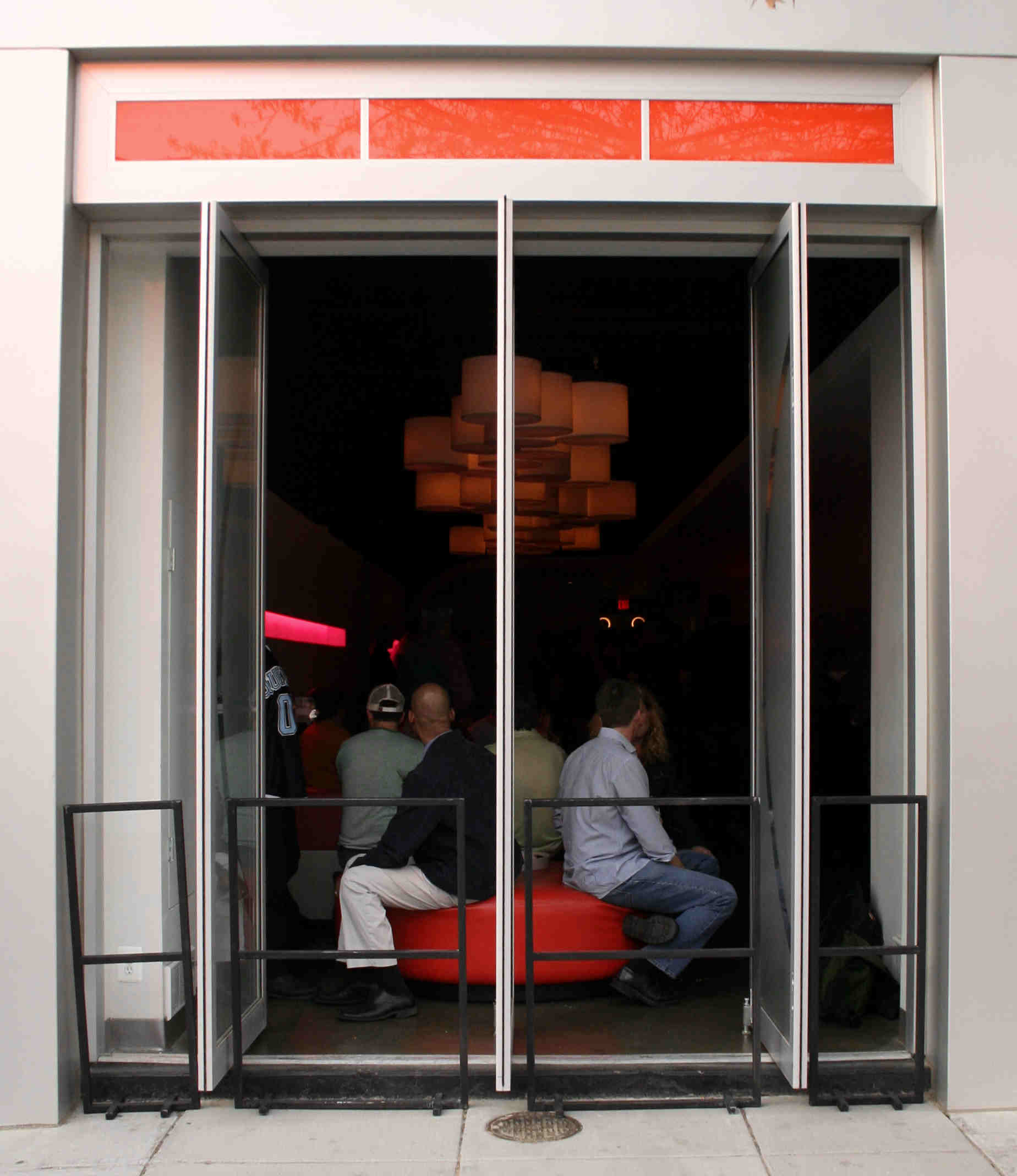
Halo in 2006

Halo was a gay bar located at 1435 P Street NW in the Logan Circle neighborhood of Washington, D.C., United States. Founded in 2004 by Ed Bailey and John Guggenmos, Halo first gained attention by being one of the few smoke-free gay bars in the city before its smoking ban was enacted in January 2007. Bailey and Guggenmos previously started other Washington D.C. LGBT clubs and events including the Velvet Nation party at Nation, Tracks, Millennium at the 9:30 Club, Ozone, and Cobalt. In 2007, Bailey and Guggenmos sold their remaining share of Halo to Babak Movahedi and opened Town Danceboutique on U Street, NW.

Halo's location was a narrow, two-story building that originally served as an automobile repair shop. When the bar opened in 2004, only the second floor was used by Halo and it consisted of 1,500 square feet (140 m^{2}). In September 2005, the first floor of Halo opened bringing the total amount of space to approximately 3,000 square feet (280 m^{2}) with a capacity for 200 people. Halo's interior design by Greg Keffer of Studios Architecture was influenced by the Art Deco movement. The bar featured curved ceilings, white walls, blue and purple accent lighting, silver bar stools, and winding banquettes. In August 2008, the second floor underwent a $200,000 (equivalent to $300,000 in 2025) renovation designed by Paolo Zavala of VOA Associates Incorporated that was described as retro-futuristic and compared to scenes from Stanley Kubrick's movie, A Clockwork Orange. The reopening of the second floor bar took place on September 5, 2008, and included a ribbon cutting ceremony by Adrian Fenty, then the mayor of the District of Columbia.

Halo closed in early 2010, and was replaced by Mova Lounge. Mova Lounge declared bankruptcy in October 2010. Mova Lounge closed in December 2012. The space was radically renovated (removing much of its modernist look) and occupied by Number Nine in early 2011. The new bar caters to a wider range of customers than Halo or Mova Lounge, although most of its clientele is still primarily gay men.

== See also ==
- Phase 1 (bar)
- Ziegfeld's
