= In a Perfect World =

In a Perfect World may refer to:

- In a Perfect World (Aquarium Rescue Unit album), 1994
- In a Perfect World (Kodaline album), 2013
- In a Perfect World..., a 2009 album by Keri Hilson
- In a Perfect World (Kanye West album), unreleased studio album by Kanye West
- "In a Perfect World", a song by Bananarama from their 1986 album True Confessions
- "In a Perfect World", a song by Dean Lewis and Julia Michaels (2023)

== See also ==
- Perfect World (disambiguation)
