= Patrick MacLeamy =

American architect

MacLeamy at HOK 60th anniversary (2015)

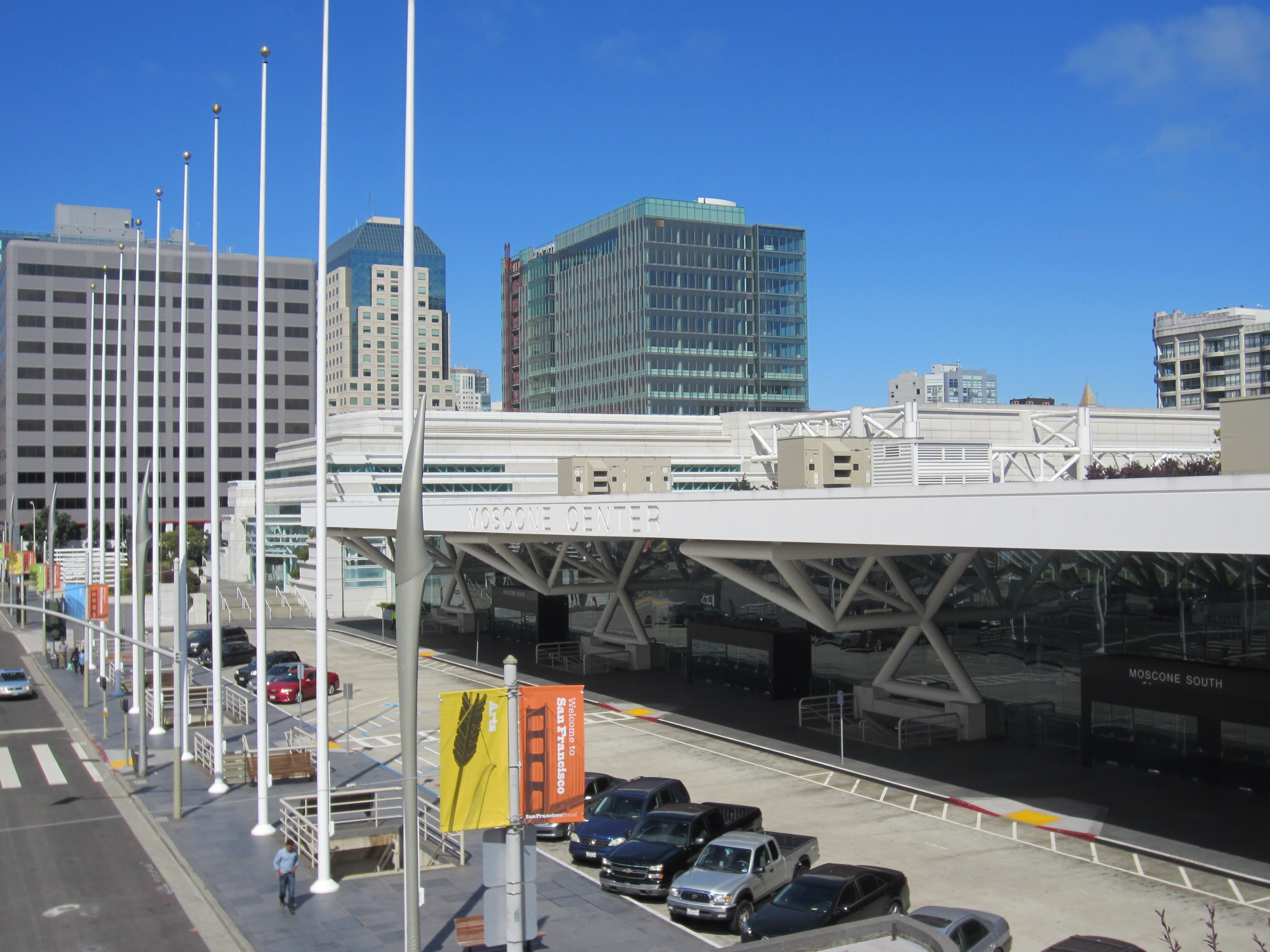
Moscone Center in San Francisco

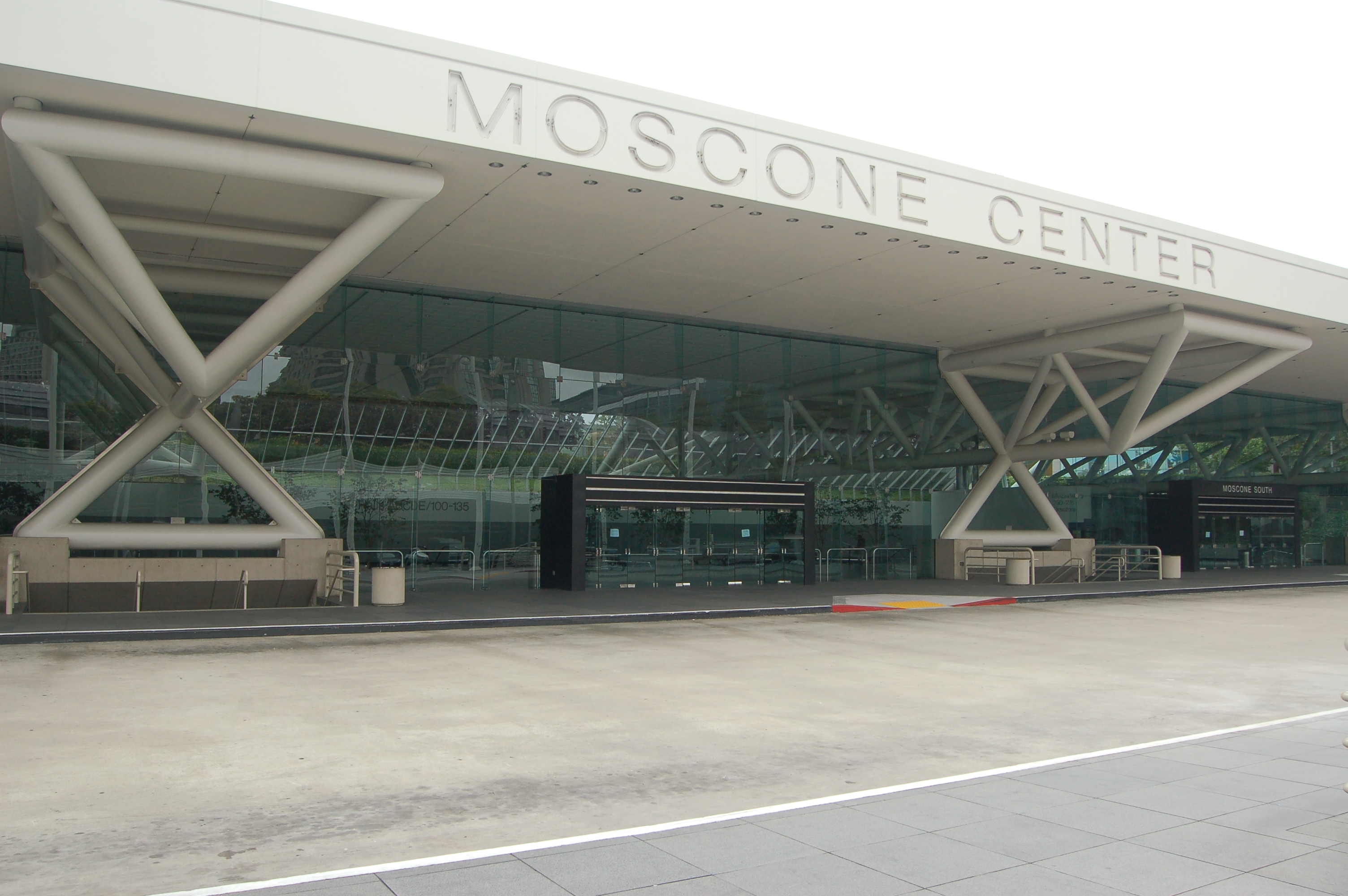
Moscone Center in San Francisco

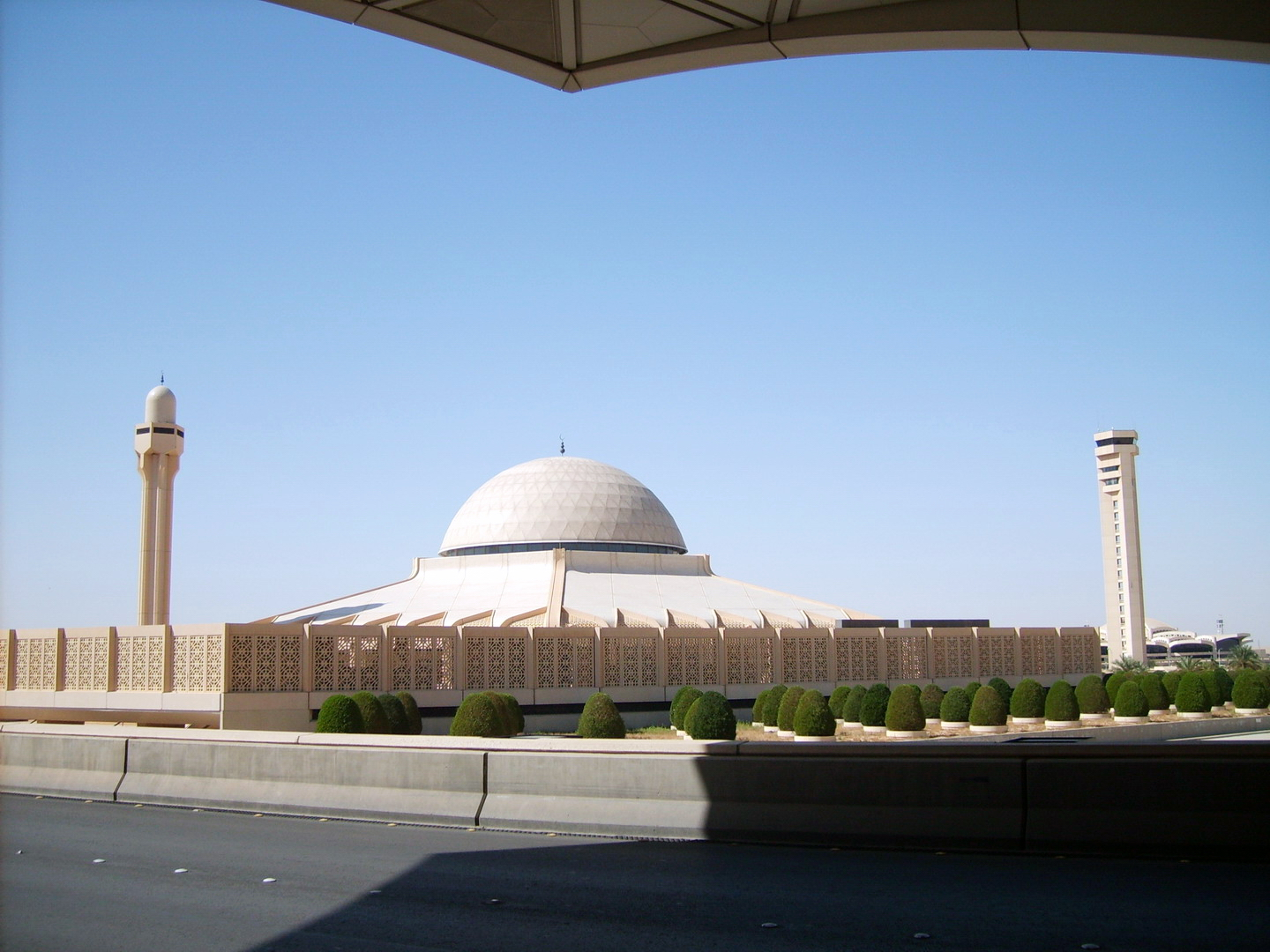
King Khalid International Airport in Riyadh, Saudi Arabia

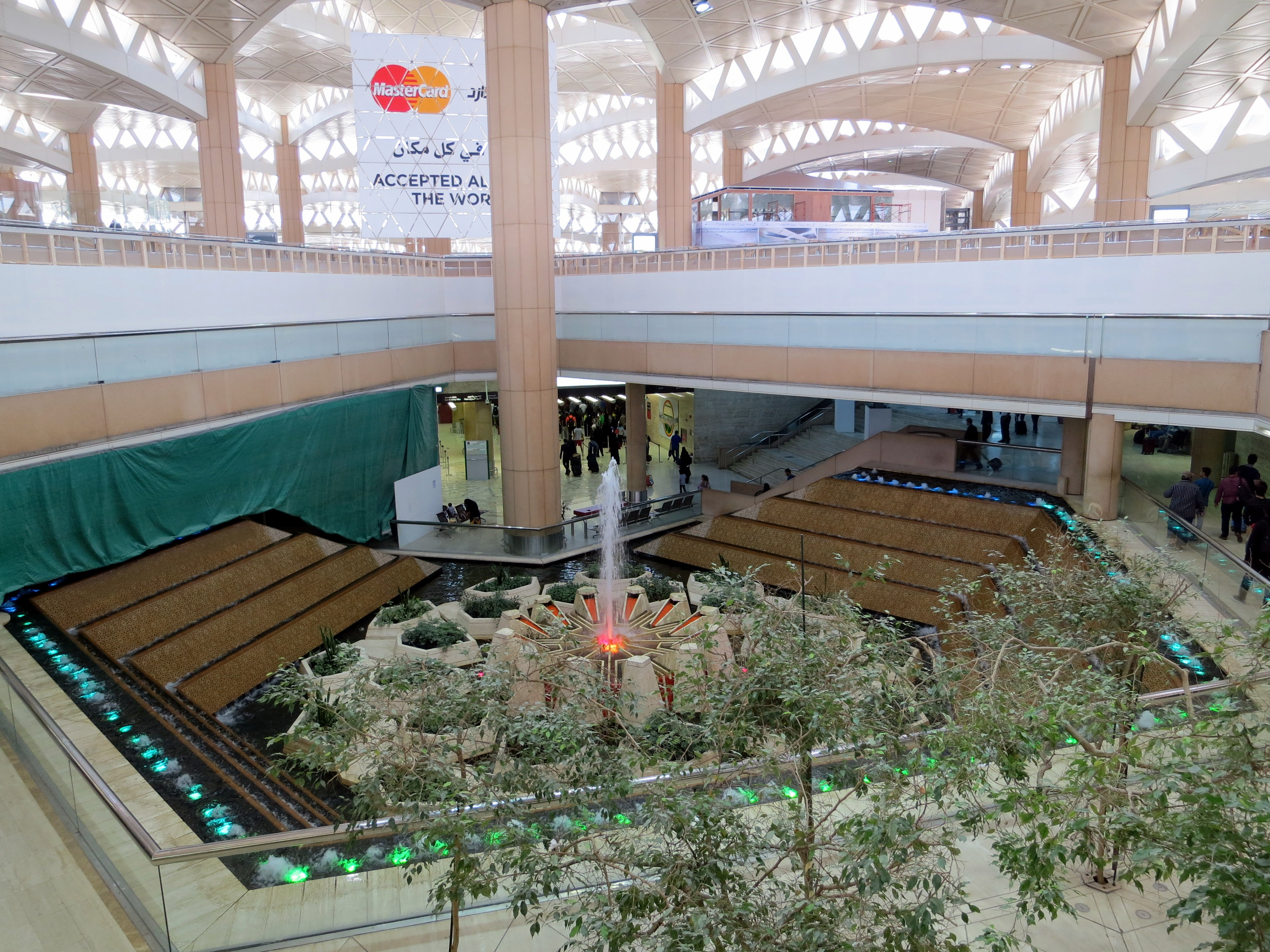
King Khalid International Airport in Riyadh, Saudi Arabia

Patrick MacLeamy, FAIA, (born October 2, 1942, in Alton, Illinois), is an American architect and executive who is chairman of buildingSMART International. Previously, he was chairman and CEO of HOK, a global architecture, engineering and planning firm. MacLeamy is the author of the book Designing a World-Class Architecture Firm: The People, Stories and Strategies Behind HOK, published by Wiley in April 2020. The book tells the history of HOK, one of the largest design firms in the world, and draws lessons from HOK intended to help other architects and creative services professionals improve their own practices. “Build Smart,” a podcast co-hosted by MacLeamy and Mark R. LePage is inspired by MacLeamy's book.

MacLeamy has been an industry advocate for the need to leverage new technologies and collaboration tools to improve the practice of architecture. As a founder and chairman of buildingSMART International (formerly the International Alliance for Interoperability), MacLeamy has advanced the global implementation of building information modeling (BIM) to improve the quality and efficiency of the architectural design process. He also supports the establishment of nonproprietary and interoperable standards for the exchange of data in the design and construction industry.

MacLeamy developed a concept, commonly referenced in the design and construction industry as the MacLeamy Curve, to illustrate the escalating cost of design modifications as a project team progresses in the design process. His time-effort distribution curves "are among the most oft-cited sources for researchers interested in mainstreaming building information modeling (BIM) implementation in the architecture, engineering and construction (AEC) industry."

== Career ==
MacLeamy began practicing at HOK in the firm’s St. Louis office in 1967. He relocated to San Francisco in 1970 to help establish the firm’s first regional office. He was named managing principal of that office in 1983 and became HOK's chief operating officer in 2000. In 2003, MacLeamy was appointed CEO and in 2012 he also was named chairman. In April 2016, as part of a planned succession, he stepped down as CEO but remained as HOK’s chairman until June 2017.

During his career, MacLeamy has had leadership roles on several prominent architectural projects, including the Moscone Center in San Francisco and the King Khalid International Airport in Riyadh, Saudi Arabia.

In 2019, MacLeamy was elected a fellow in the National Academy of Construction. He is the past chairman and a current member of the Construction Industry Round Table, a national business trade association. He was on the American Institute of Architects (AIA) Large Firm Roundtable, composed of CEOs from large architectural and engineering firms working to advance the interests of practices working nationally and internationally. In 2005, MacLeamy was honored with the President’s Award from the National Institute for Building Sciences (NIBS).

MacLeamy was the keynote speaker at the Nordic BIM Academy’s buildingSMART conference in Copenhagen, Denmark, in November 2016. Nordic BIM Academy is Scandinavia’s largest conference devoted to OpenBIM. MacLeamy described his vision of BIM and collaboration in the AEC (architecture/engineering/construction) industry.

He is a Fellow of the American Institute of Architects, a Leadership in Energy and Environmental Design credentialed professional and appears as a guest on architectural, sustainability and business/leadership podcasts and forums.

== Criticism ==
MacLeamy claims to have developed the concepts of the "MacLeamy Curve" in 2004 as explicitly stated in his YouTube videos However the basis of these ideas and curves first appeared in an article written by Professor Boyd Paulson in 1976. some 28 years prior to MacLeamy's development of the "MacLeamy Curve". MacLeamy says that he himself called it the "Effort Curve" and that others later began calling it the "MacLeamy Curve."

== Personal ==
MacLeamy and his wife, architect Jeanne MacLeamy, FAIA, live in Novato, California. American television journalist, author and speaker Elisabeth Leamy is their daughter. Their son, Patrick D. MacLeamy, is a licensed psychologist.

== See also ==
- Integrated project delivery - the x-axis of Effort Curve
