= Integrated project delivery =

Project delivery method

Integrated project delivery (IPD) is a construction project delivery method that seeks the efficiency and involvement of all participants (people, systems, business structures and practices) through all phases of design, fabrication, and construction. IPD combines ideas from integrated practice and lean construction. The objectives of IPD are to increase productivity, reduce waste (waste being described as resources spent on activities that do not add value to the end product), avoid time overruns, enhance final product quality, and reduce conflicts between owners, architects and contractors during construction. IPD emphasizes the use of technology to facilitate communication between the parties involved in the construction process.

== Background ==
The construction industry has suffered from a productivity decline since the 1960s while all other non-farm industries have seen large boosts in productivity. Proponents of Integrated project delivery argue that problems in contemporary construction, such as buildings that are behind schedule and over budget, are due to adverse relations between the owner, general contractor, and architect.

Using ideas developed by Toyota in their Toyota Production System and computer technology advances, the new focus in IPD is the final value created for the owner. In essence, IPD sees all allocation of resources for any activity that does not add value to the end product (the finished building) as wasteful.

== IPD in practice ==
In Practice, the IPD system is a process where all disciplines in a construction project work as one firm. The primary team members include the architect, key technical consultants as well as a general contractor and subcontractors. The growing use of building information modeling in the construction industry is allowing for easier sharing of information between project participants using IPD and is considered a tool to increase productivity throughout the construction process.

Unlike the design–build project delivery method which typically places the contractor in the leading role on a building project, IPD represents a return to the "master builder" concept where the entire building team including the owner, architect, general contractor, building engineers, fabricators, and subcontractors work collaboratively throughout the construction process.

== Multi-Party Agreements ==
One common way to further the goals of IPD is through a multi-party agreement among key participants. In a multi-party agreement (MPA), the primary project participants execute a single contract specifying their respective roles, rights, obligations, and liabilities. In effect, the multi-party agreement creates a temporary virtual, and in some instances formal, organization to realize a specific project. Because a single agreement is used, each party understands its role in relationship to the other participants. Compensation structures are often open-book, so each party's interests and contributions are similarly transparent. Multi-party agreements require trust, as compensation is tied to overall project success and individual success depends on the contributions of all team members.

Common forms of multi-party agreements include

- project alliances, which create a project structure where the owner guaranteed the direct costs of non-owner parties, but payment of profit, overhead and bonus depends on project outcome;
- a single-purpose entity, which is a temporary, but formal, legal structure created to realize a specific project;
- and relational contracts, which are similar to Project Alliances in that a virtual organization is created from individual entities, but it differs in its approach to compensation, risk sharing and decision making.

== The role of technology in IPD ==
The adoption of IPD as a standard for collaborative good practice on construction projects presents its own problems. As most construction projects involve disparate stakeholders, traditional IT solutions are not conducive to collaborative working. Sharing files behind IT firewalls, large email attachment sizes and the inability to view all manner of file types without the native software all make IPD difficult.

The need to overcome collaborative IT challenges has been one of the drivers behind the growth of online construction collaboration technology. Since 2000, a new generation of technology companies evolved using SaaS to facilitate IPD.

This collaboration software streamlines the flow of documentation, communications and workflows ensuring everyone is working from 'one version of the truth'. Collaboration software allows users from disparate locations to keep all communications, documents & drawings, forms and data, amongst other types of electronic file, in one place. Version control is assured and users are able to view and mark up files online without the need for native software. The technology also enables project confidence and mitigates risk thanks to inbuilt audit trails.

== Criticism ==
A significant criticism of Lean Manufacturing is that the single-minded focus on efficiency is often associated with a lack of concern for employee safety and well-being. However, there it is unclear if this has led to a poor safety performance and increased stress levels among construction workers, as they strive reach higher goals with less resources.

== Job Order Contracting ==
Job Order Contracting, JOC is form of integrated project delivery that specifically targets repair, renovation, and minor new construction. It has proven to be capable of delivering over 90% of projects on-time, on-budget, and to the satisfaction of the owner, contractors, and customer alike.

== See also ==
- Building information modeling
- Lean construction
- Patrick MacLeamy - the inventor of MacLeamy Curve
