= Elisabeth Leamy =

American journalist, author and speaker (born 1967)

Elisabeth Ann Leamy
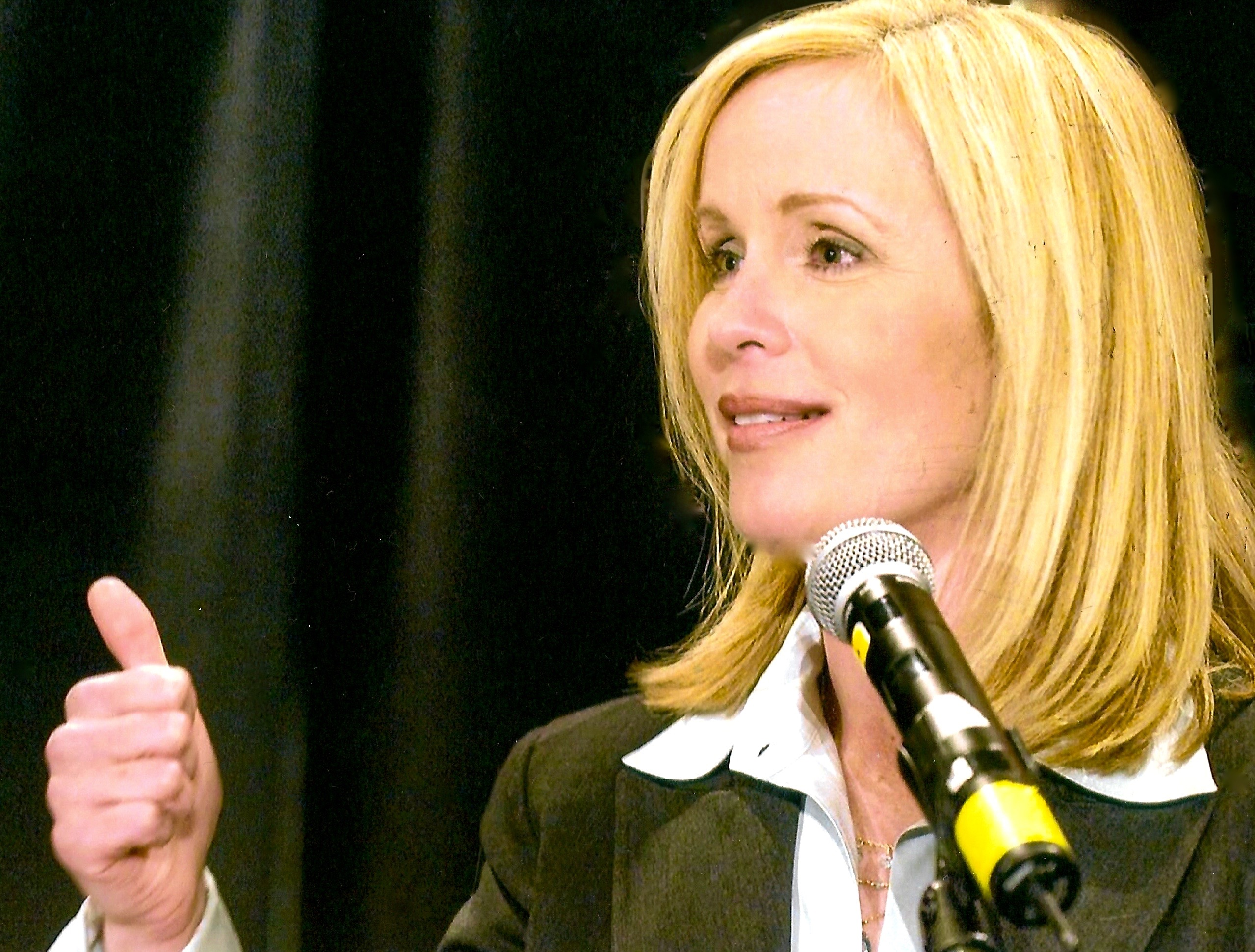
- Leamy in 2013
- Born: September 10, 1967 (age 59); St. Louis, Missouri, U.S.
- Other name: Eli
- Occupations: American journalist; author; speaker; Investigative correspondent for The Dr. Oz Show
- Known for: Consumer correspondent for Good Morning America and other ABC News programs
- Awards: 13 Emmy Awards; 4 Edward R. Murrow Awards

Elisabeth Ann Leamy (born September 10, 1967) is an American journalist, author and speaker. Currently, she writes a column for The Washington Post. Leamy also hosts a podcast called "Easy Money", produced by District Productive in Washington, D.C.

Leamy has been the investigative correspondent for The Dr. Oz Show since 2013. From 2005 to 2013, she was the consumer correspondent for Good Morning America and other ABC News programs. Leamy wrote an ABC News Business column from 2006 to 2015. In 2014, she was the host of the YouTube show "Free For All", about free products and services available to consumers.

Leamy is the author of two books, Save BIG: Cut Your Top 5 Costs and Save Thousands (2010) and The Savvy Consumer: How to Avoid Scams and Rip-Offs That Cost You Time and Money (2004) and is the recipient of 13 Emmy awards.

Leamy is also a professional speaker with membership in the National Speakers Association. She gives speeches about financial literacy, career success, pitching stories to the media, and saving money.

== Early life ==
Elisabeth Ann Leamy was born September 10, 1967, in St. Louis, MO, and spent most of her childhood in the San Francisco Bay Area. She graduated from The Branson School in Ross, California.

Leamy received her bachelor's degree from the University of California, Berkeley and her master's degree from Northwestern University's Medill School of Journalism.

== Career ==
=== Early career ===
Leamy began her television news career in Bakersfield, California, at KERO-TV 23. She then worked at WFLA-TV in Tampa from 1994 to 1997. Leamy was the consumer and investigative reporter at Fox 5 WTTG in Washington, D.C., from 1997 to 2005.

=== Current career ===
Currently, Elisabeth Leamy writes a Washington Post consumer column about topics such as how to avoid robocalls, whether expensive paint brands are worth it, and ways to save money on organic groceries.

Leamy launched a podcast in June 2006 called "Easy Money" about ways to make more money, save more money, and find your unclaimed money. The podcast has an accompanying blog where Leamy posts detailed show notes for her listeners.

From 2005 to 2013, she was the consumer correspondent for Good Morning America and other ABC News programs. Leamy continues to write an ABC News Business column. She was host of the YouTube show "Free For All", about free products and services available to consumers. Leamy is the author of two books, Save BIG: Cut Your Top 5 Costs and Save Thousands (2010) and The Savvy Consumer: How to Avoid Scams and Rip-Offs That Cost You Time and Money (2004).

=== Notable news reports ===
In 1999, while at WTTG, Leamy broadcast an investigative story about a Washington, D.C., rave party called "Buzz". The story alleged that D.C. police officers working off-duty security for the party ignored drug use by patrons. The Washington City Paper criticized the story. Buzz was temporarily shut down and the owners later sued WTTG.

In 2006, Leamy investigated the herbal remedy "Airborne" for Good Morning America, questioning the company's clinical trial evidence and marketing claims. Two years later, Airborne settled a class action lawsuit and FTC charges, not admitting fault, but agreeing to refund consumers up to $30 million.

In 2010, Leamy conducted an exclusive interview with President Barack Obama about the Dodd–Frank Wall Street Reform and Consumer Protection Act.

From 2011 to 2012, Leamy did a series of reports for Good Morning America called "Show Me the Money" which reunited people with unclaimed money held by the government totaling nearly $2 million.

Leamy's story about a West Virginia Woman who was trying to collect a $10 million judgment from an abusive debt collector was ABC's most-trafficked web feature of 2012.

In 2013, Leamy reported for The Dr. Oz Show that epidural steroid injections for back pain are not FDA approved and have caused injuries and deaths.

Later that year, she reported that LASIK eye surgery had more serious side effects than first reported.

In 2015, Leamy reported for The Dr. Oz Show that ten doctors who had called upon Columbia University to fire Dr. Oz had ties to the Genetically Modified Food industry. Dr. Oz has said that genetically modified food should be labeled as such.

== Personal life ==
Leamy is married to Kris Persinger, a financial planner, and they have a daughter. Her father is Patrick MacLeamy, Chairman of HOK, an architectural firm.

== Awards ==
Leamy is the recipient of 13 Emmy awards and 4 Edward R. Murrow Awards. In 2001, she was a finalist for the Livingston Award for young journalists.
