= Phase 1 (bar) =

Coordinates: 38.881992°N 76.994988°W

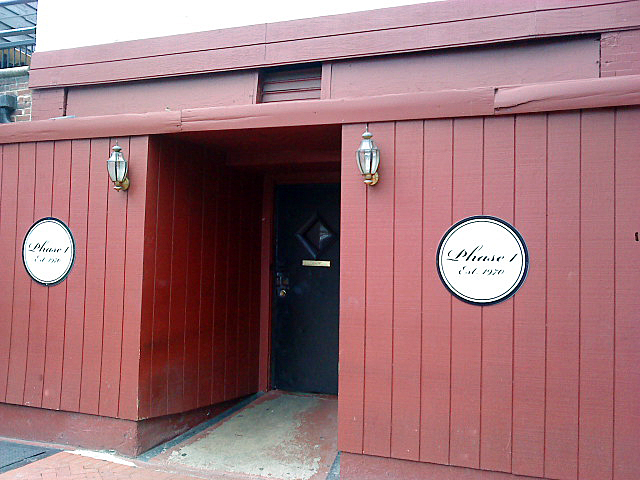
- The bar's exterior in 2012
- Interactive map of Phase 1

Restaurant information
- Established: 1970
- Closed: 2016
- Dress code: Casual
- Location: 525 8th St SE (8th and E), Washington, D.C., United States

Phase 1, also known as The Phase, was a lesbian bar and nightclub at 525 8th Street, Southeast in Washington, D.C. Located one block south of Pennsylvania Avenue, SE near Eastern Market in the Capitol Hill neighborhood, Phase 1 was the oldest continually operating lesbian bar in the United States and the oldest operating LGBTQ bar in Washington, D.C. until its closure in February, 2016.

== History ==
In 1971, Allen Carroll and Chris Jansen founded Phase 1 and would go on to open another LGBT bar in Southeast, Ziegfeld's. Phase 1 was originally located beside Plus One, a gay bar that broke the city's "no same-sex dancing" code when owners Henry Hecht of the Hecht's department store family, Donn Culver, and Bill Bickford installed a dance floor.

== Events ==
Phase 1 was a sponsor of Capital Pride, the LGBT pride festival held each year in Washington, D.C. and the fourth largest gay pride event in the United States. Phase 1 also worked with local organizations such as the Whitman-Walker Clinic and D.C. Rape Crisis Center.

In August 2007, musician Mara Levi, Phase 1 manager Angela Lombardi, and Riot Grrl, Ink organized the first Phase Fest. The three-day event hosted at Phase 1 featured local and nationwide musical acts such as God-Des and She, Nicky Click, and others which are geared towards lesbians. The event became the largest queer art and music festival on the East Coast.

== See also ==
- Codman Carriage House and Stable, previous location of Phase 1's second venue
- Halo (bar)
- List of LGBTQ bars
- Velvet Nation
