= Early contractor involvement =

Type of construction contract

Early contractor involvement (ECI) is a type of construction contract where the principal contractor is engaged at an early stage in a project to offer input into the design phase. It is in contrast to the design–bid–build model where the contractor is only brought onboard at the end of the design phase. The model allows the contractor to have an input in the design of the scheme and suggest value engineering changes. Studies have shown that savings of around 10% in construction phase time and 7% in cost are achievable through the use of ECI. The ECI model has become increasingly popular in the United Kingdom since the early 2000s and is also used in Australia and New Zealand.

== Description ==
In traditional construction contracts (known as design–bid–build contracts) the principal contractor is only engaged when a detailed design is complete. An invitation to tender is published and a number of contractors will price the construction of the design, from which a single winner will be chosen to complete the works. Contractors are traditionally not paid for their work on the tender and only the winning contractor, therefore, has the opportunity to recover costs through his profit margin on the construction work. As unsuccessful tenderers may incur substantial costs in pricing complicated works this tended to lead to inflated prices.

Under an early contractor involvement (ECI) system a single contractor is selected at an earlier stage in the process and is paid for their work on the scheme. This can be either at the preliminary/concept design or detailed design stages, depending on client preference. The contractor can then use their knowledge and experience to influence the project design to increase buildability or value and may be asked to advise on construction phase risks. The contractor may choose to involve their supply chain sub-contractors in the process to offer additional expertise. The contractor is able to build their price for the works during the process, in consultation with the client and designer.

As the ability of parties to affect project cost and programme is greater in the design stages than in the construction phase then the potential for value engineering is greater under ECI contracts than traditional contracts. ECI contracts tend to lead to more harmonious client-contractor relationship, though there is less competition than with traditional open tenders. The ECI contract model has similar aims to the design–build model, but responsibility for the design is retained with the design team.

== History ==
The model was first studied in 1976 and studies through the 1990s showed that adopting such a model could generate 10% savings on project time and 7% on cost. The wider adoption of ECI was a recommendation of the 1994 Latham Report into systemic failings in the British construction industry; the practice became increasing popular during the early 2000s. Initially ECI work tended to be unpaid but this proved unsatisfactory to contractors who thought it devalued their contributions and by 2005 most ECI work was on a paid basis. This also helped to prevent losses to contractors in instances when projects did not progress to construction, under unpaid ECI contracts clients had faced claims for compensation from contractors in these cases.

An ECI option was introduced into the popular NEC Engineering and Construction Contract suite of contracts in December 2015. The model has also been used in New Zealand since the early 2000s and in Australia.
