= Buzz (dance party) =

Dance party in Washington, D.C.

Buzz – once called "Washington's best electronic dance night" by The Washington Post – was one of Washington, D.C.'s longest running dance parties. It was co-founded by DJ/promoter Scott Henry and DJ/promoter and DC music store (Music Now) owner Lieven DeGeyndt at the East Side Club and then relaunched in October 1995 at the now demolished Nation, formerly the Capital Ballroom. At its peak it was one of the largest dance parties on the East Coast and voted "Best Party" four years in a row by then electronic dance music culture magazine URB (magazine). Buzz attracted the world's top electronic dance music artists to Washington, DC.

== Beginnings ==
Buzz first began in 1993 at the Eastside Club in DC. Early line-ups included prominent east coast DJs like Moby, Little Louie Vega, Frankie Bones, and Josh Wink. The Eastside club events ran in conjunction with a party on the lower level of the club called, Serve, which featured mostly house music. Buzz went through several other venues including a location next to The Ritz and a temporary underground venue off of New York avenue in DC before relaunching at the Capital Ballroom in October 1995. The Capital Ballroom changed management in 1999 and became known as Nation (nightclub).

== Fox 5 incident and aftermath ==
Buzz was shut down temporarily in 1999 after Fox 5 WTTG reporter Elisabeth Leamy broadcast murky hidden camera footage purportedly showing drug use at the party during sweeps week. Buzzlife Productions owners Scott Henry and Lieven DeGeyndt filed a lawsuit against Fox 5 and a settlement was reached out of court.

On September 18, 2002, Buzzlife Productions issued a press release stating that due to "increased pressure from the DC Government, the United States Military and the United States Federal Government, Buzzlife Productions announces that its weekly event, Buzz will no longer take place in Washington, DC, effective immediately.

"A two and a half year investigation of DC nightclubs was launched by the military to supervise the off-duty hours of their local personnel. Unfortunately, the irresponsible behavior of a few triggered a large-scale clampdown on all military nightlife activities. In early September Nation nightclub was declared off-limits to all servicemen. However, the "witch-hunt" was not over.

"In an unprecedented move, the United States Military and the DC Police Department joined forces to share information and resources targeting both the Friday night event Buzz and the nightclub Nation. Innocent patrons were harassed and Nation management was threatened with legal action that could result in the loss of their liquor license.

"'It is unfortunate that events that cater to the youth of America historically become targets of government agencies,' comments Amanda Huie, Buzzlife Director of PR and Marketing. 'As leaders in this industry, we will not allow Buzz to become a scapegoat, and in essence, tarnish all electronic dance music events.'"

Buzz relocated to Baltimore at Redwood Trust for about a year, and returned to Nation in 2003 as Cubik.

Buzz persevered despite an anti-rave climate, leading a petition drive to defeat the RAVE Act, and despite Department of Defense rules restricting military personnel from attending Buzz and Velvet Nation, the gay party held at Nation on Saturday nights.

== End of Nation era ==
The creation of the new Washington Nationals baseball stadium led to Nation being torn down.

The end of the Buzz at Nation era was marked at its closing party on July 14, 2006. Artists included Scott Henry, Lieven DeGeyndt, Lonnie Fisher, DJ Dan, Utah Saints, Rabbit in the Moon, DJ Micro, John B, Scott Hardkiss, Fort Knox Five, Tittsworth, Jon Tab, and Palash.

== Final party ==
Below is the Buzz Closing Party Set List as posted to message boards the night of the event:

- Front Room
- 08.00-09.00 – Sinestro
- 09.00-09.45 – Lonnie Fisher
- 09.45-11.00 – Scott Hardkiss
- 11:00-12:00 – John B
- 12.00-01.00 – DB
- 01.00-02.00 – Palash
- 02:00-03:00 – Fort Knox Five
- 03.00-04.00 – Feelgood
- 04:00-close – Sunshine Jones of Dubtribe Soundsystem
- Rubik Room
- 09.00-10.00 – Scientific
- 10.00-11.00 – Jeremy Granger
- 11.00-12.00 – Mike Myers
- 12.00-12.50 – Switchstance & Adegen
- 12.50-01.40 – Wes Smith & Smalls
- 01.40-02.30 – Joe Kopasek
- 02:30-03:30 – Illeffect & Deinfamous
- 03.30-04.30 – Jesse Tittsworth
- 04:30-close – Muramasa
- Main Room
- 10.00-11.00 – Dave Trance
- 11:00-12:00 – Lieven
- 12.00-01.00 – Dave Ralph
- 01.00-02.00 – Micro
- 02:00-03:00 – RITM
- 03.00-04.00 – The Utah Saints
- 04:00-05:00 – DJ Dan
- 05.00-close – Scott Henry

== Resident DJs ==
Resident DJs over the years included Scott Henry, Lieven DeGeyndt, Charles Feelgood, John Tab, Muramasa, Dave Ralph, Deep Dish, Dieselboy, Donald Glaude, and Tall Paul.

In 2000, Donald Glaude recorded a live set at Buzz that was released as "Mixed Live: Buzz @ Nation" on Moonshine Music on June 26, 2001.

== Post-Nation ==
Buzz was resurrected for several months at FUR nightclub in DC beginning September 21, 2007. Buzz held events at various other DC venues including Avalon, Ibiza, 2K9, and Woolly Mammoth.

In October 2009, Buzz hosted a Caribbean cruise event called the BuzzBoat. Their second BuzzBoat was in October 2011, with a lineup that included Scott Henry, Charles Feelgood, Frankie Bones, DJ Icey, Simply Jeff, 2Rip, Monsterz Under the Bed, Danchik, and Proxxy & Lantern.
