= Perfect World (Clint Crisher album) =

Clint Crisher

Studio album by Clint Crisher
- Released: 1999
- Recorded: 1997–1999
- Genre: House
- Length: 71:42
- Label: Crisher Entertainment
- Producer: Willie Ray Lewis

Clint Crisher chronology
Clint Crisher (1999)	Terrific Distraction (2007)

Singles from Perfect World
- 1. "Perfect World" Released: May 25, 1999; 2. "Destiny" Released: July 24, 2000; 3. "One More Try" Released: February 20, 2002

Perfect World is the first studio album of American singer, Clint Crisher. It was recorded from 1997 to 1999. Only a limited run was printed, without the backing of a major label. To promote the release of the album Crisher performed an elaborate Halloween show for 1200 people during Millennium at the 9:30 Club in Washington, D.C., on October 31, 1998 opening with Big Boy. Perfect World was officially released June 15, 1999 with a performance on the main stage with the United States Capitol building in the background for the June 13, 1999 Capital Pride annual LGBT pride festival in Washington, D.C., with over 150,000 attendees. The title track, Perfect World reached No. 7 on the TOP 100 MP3 in the United Kingdom. On September 30, Crisher performed One More Try live at the Stonewall Inn showcase presented by Xtreme Promotions and Music Plant Records during the Billboard Dance Music Summit 2002.

== Track listing ==
No.	Title	Writer(s)	Producer(s)	Length
1.	"Intro: The Sun, Moon & Stars"	Clint Crisher, Willie Ray Lewis	Willie Ray Lewis	4:21
2.	"Perfect World"	Crisher	Willie Ray Lewis	6:50
3.	"Clint's Read"	Crisher	Willie Ray Lewis	5:46
4.	"Survival"	Crisher	Willie Ray Lewis	5:26
5.	"Destiny"	Crisher	Willie Ray Lewis	4:41
6.	"One More Try"	George Michael	Willie Ray Lewis	5:50
7.	"Eight"	Crisher	Willie Ray Lewis	8:22
8.	"Big Boy"	Crisher	Willie Ray Lewis	7:57
9.	"I Believe It"	Crisher	Willie Ray Lewis	5:52
10.	"Music Is the Reason"	Crisher	Willie Ray Lewis	6:03
11.	"Survival (Willie's Velvet Mix)"	Crisher	Willie Ray Lewis	10:34
Total length:				71:42
