= Velvet Nation =

Gay dance event at the Nation nightclub, Washington D.C., U.S.

Coordinates: 38°52′41.6″N 77°0′27.9″W

Velvet Nation was a gay dance event that took place at the Nation nightclub, formerly known as The Capitol Ballroom, located at 1015 Half Street, SE in Washington, D.C. The party name was derived from the venue name and "Velvet", an ode to the gay community. This event was hosted weekly on Saturday nights, 388 times over seven years, serving more than 741,000 patrons. The event ended when Nation closed on July 16, 2006. The club was forced to close because of eminent domain, and the land is now part of the redevelopment program being spurred by the new Nationals Park baseball stadium in the Navy Yard/Near Southeast neighborhood.

Velvet Nation was created and operated by John Guggenmos and Ed Bailey. For many years, it hosted circuit event DJs and talents such as Junior Vasquez, Victor Calderone, The Pet Shop Boys, k.d. lang, and The Village People. It was also known for its theme events such as Madonnarama, a night of all Madonna music and video, and its foam parties.

In Fall 2007, Bailey and Guggenmos opened the follow-up to Velvet Nation, Town Danceboutique, a two-story, 20,000-square-foot (1,900 m^{2}) gay nightclub in Northwest D.C.

== See also ==
- Nation (nightclub)
- Halo (bar)
- Phase 1 (bar)
- Ziegfeld's
