= Lean construction =

Manufacturing methodology

Lean construction is a combination of operational research and practical development in design and construction with an adoption of lean manufacturing principles and practices to the end-to-end design and construction process.

== Paradigm ==
Lean construction required the application of a robust programmatic framework to all repair, renovation, maintenance, and or new build activities. While each project may be unique, the application of LEAN fundamental should be applied consistently. Lean construction is concerned with the alignment and holistic pursuit of concurrent and continuous improvements in all dimensions of the built and natural environment: design, construction, activation, maintenance, salvaging, and recycling. This approach tries to manage and improve construction processes with minimum cost and maximum value by considering customer needs.

== Historical development ==
The origins of many fundamental concepts of LEAN and LEAN construction date back in time.

1. The origins of foundational LEAN concepts can be traced back to the 1450s in Venice, but the concept is often associated with Henry Ford and Toyota in the 20th century. LEAN was first applied in "modern day" production management by Henry Ford, and his ground-breaking automobile manufacturing company in the early 20th century. Students of LEAN history should begin with the Ford manufacturing plant in Highland Park, Michigan, USA., in 1913.
2. Manufacturing process thinking dates even further back to Arsenal in Venice in the 1450s
3. A lean "thought process" was introduced in The Machine That Changed the World in 1990, however, it and subsequent iterations focus largely on FLOW.
4. While FLOW is important, the achievement of efficient flow, must involve the integration of planning, procurement, and project delivery within a common data environment. This aspect was not addressed significantly, if at all. It was initially implemented in construction, however, via Job Order Contracting in the 1980s (which has subsequently evolved substantially) and later with Integrated Project Delivery.

Lauri Koskela, in 1992, challenged the construction management community to consider the inadequacies of the time-cost-quality tradeoff paradigm. Another paradigm-breaking anomaly was that observed by Ballard (1994), Ballard and Howell (1994a and 1994b), and Howell (1998). Analysis of project plan failures indicated that "normally only about 50% of the tasks on weekly work plans are completed by the end of the plan week" and that constructors could mitigate most of the problems through "active management of variability, starting with the structuring of the project (temporary production system) and continuing through its operation and improvement".

Evidence from research and observations indicated that the conceptual models of Construction Management and the tools it utilizes (work breakdown structure, critical path method, and earned value management) fail to deliver projects "on-time, at budget, and at desired quality". With recurring negative experiences on projects, evidenced by endemic quality problems and rising litigation, it became evident that the governing principles of construction management needed revisiting. One comment published by the CMAA, in its Sixth Annual Survey of Owners (2006), pointed to concern about work methods and the cost of waste:

"While the cost of steel and cement are making headlines, the less publicized failures in the management of construction projects can be disastrous. Listen carefully to the message in this comment. We are not talking about just materials, methods, equipment, or contract documents. We are talking about how we work to deliver successful capital projects and how we manage the costs of inefficiency."

=== A new paradigm ===
Koskela (2000) argued that the mismatch between the conceptual models and observed reality underscored the lack of robustness in the existing constructs and signaled the need for a theory of production in construction. Koskela then used the ideal production system embodied in the Toyota Production System to develop a more overarching production management paradigm for project-based production systems where production is conceptualized in three complementary ways, namely, as a Transformation (T), as a Flow (F), and as Value generation (V).

- Transformation is the production of inputs into outputs.
- Flow can be defined as "Movement that is smooth and uninterrupted, as in the 'flow of work from one crew to the next' or the flow of value at the Pull of the customer."
- Value is "What the Customer is actually paying for the project to produce and install."

Koskela and Howell (2002) also presented a review of existing management theory – specifically as related to the planning, execution, and control paradigms – in project-based production systems. Both conceptualizations provide a solid intellectual foundation of lean construction as evident from both research and practice.

Recognizing that construction sites reflect prototypical behavior of complex and chaotic systems, especially in the flow of both material and information on and off site, Bertelsen (2003a and 2003b) suggested that construction should be modeled using chaos and complex systems theory. Bertelsen (2003b) specifically argued that construction could and should be understood in three complementary ways:

- As a project-based production process
- As an industry that provides autonomous agents
- As a social system

== What is lean construction? ==
While the term lean construction may have been coined by the International Group for Lean Construction in its first meeting in 1993 (Gleeson et al. 2007). ) Greg Howell and Glenn Ballard, there are instances of rigorous LEAN process thinking all the way back to the Arsenal in Venice in the 1450s, and the first person to truly integrate an entire production process, Henry Ford. At Highland Park, MI, in 1913 he married consistently interchangeable parts with standard work and moving conveyance to create what he called flow production. The public grasped this in the dramatic form of the moving assembly line, but from the standpoint of the manufacturing engineer the breakthroughs actually went much further. (Note: The founders of the Lean Construction Institute in 1997) both maintain that construction in lean construction refers to the entire industry and not the phase during which construction takes place. Thus, Lean Construction is for owners, architects, designers, engineers, constructors, suppliers & end users.)

In any case, the term lean construction has escaped canonical definition. There have been a number of reasons for that. The body of knowledge has been in a state of development since 1990. Nonetheless, a definition is needed to be able to operationalize the concepts and principles contained in the philosophy. It is insightful to study the change of definition over time as that represents the evolution and advancement in the state of knowledge about Lean Construction.

The reference to Lean Construction as a proper noun is not an attempt to falsely distinguish it from other areas that focus on construction project management. It is a proper noun because it refers to a very specific set of concepts, principles, and practices that are distinct from conventional design and construction management practices .

A number of groups have proposed definitions: The International Group for Lean Construction; The Lean Construction Institute; The Associated General Contractors of America; Construction Management Association of America, and others. Researchers have also put forward definitions as foundation for their work and to invite others to add, modify and critique. A sampling is provided here.

Lean construction is a "way to design production systems to minimize waste of materials, time, and effort in order to generate the maximum possible amount of value". Designing a production system to achieve the stated ends is only possible through the collaboration of all project participants (Owner, A/E, contractors, Facility Managers, End-user) at early stages of the project. This goes beyond the contractual arrangement of design/build or constructability reviews where contractors, and sometime facility managers, merely react to designs instead of informing and influencing the design.

Lean construction recognizes that desired ends affect the means to achieve these ends, and that available means will affect realized ends. Essentially, lean construction aims to embody the benefits of the Master Builder concept.

"One can think of lean construction in a way similar to mesoeconomics. Lean construction draws upon the principles of project-level management and upon the principles that govern production-level management. Lean construction recognizes that any successful project undertaking will inevitably involve the interaction between project and production management." (Abdelhamid 2007)

Lean construction supplements traditional construction management approaches with: (1) two critical and necessary dimensions for successful capital project delivery by requiring the deliberate consideration of material and information flow and value generation in a production system; and (2) different project and production management (planning-execution-control) paradigms.

While lean construction is identical to lean production in spirit, it is different in how it was conceived as well as how it is practiced. There is a view that "adaptation" of Lean Manufacturing/Production forms the basis of lean construction. The view of Lauri Koskela, Greg Howell, and Glenn Ballard is very different, with the origin of lean construction arising mainly from the need for a production theory in construction and anomalies that were observed in the reliability of weekly production planning.

Getting work to flow reliably and predictably on a construction site requires the impeccable alignment of the entire supply chain responsible for constructed facilities such that value is maximized and waste is minimized. With such a broad scope, it is fair to say that tools found in Lean Manufacturing and Lean Production, as practiced by Toyota and others, have been adapted to be used in the fulfillment of Lean construction principles. TQM, SPC, six-sigma, have all found their way into lean construction. Similarly, tools and methods found in other areas, such as in social science and business, are used where they are applicable. The tools and methods in construction management, such as CPM and work breakdown structure, etc., are also utilized in lean construction implementations.

If the tool, method, and/or technique will assist in fulfilling the aims of lean construction, it is considered a part of the toolkit available for use. A sampling of these tools includes: BIM (Lean Design), A3, process design (Lean Design), offsite fabrication and JIT (Lean Supply), value chain mapping (Lean Assembly), visual site (Lean Assembly); 5S (Lean Assembly), daily crew huddles (Lean Assembly).

The priority for all construction work is to:

1. Keep work flowing so that the crews are always productive installing product
2. Reduce inventory of material and tools and
3. Reduce costs

Solutions that integrate construction planning, procurement, and project delivery are now readily available. The enable lean methods such as Integrated Project Delivery (IPD) and Job Order Contracting (JOC).

== Early involvement of contractors and suppliers ==
The early involvement of contractors and suppliers is seen as a key differentiator for construction so called 'best practice'. While there are Trade Marked business processes (see below), academics have also addressed related concepts such as 'early contractor involvement' (ECI).

=== Integrated Project Delivery ===
Primary IPD team members include the owner, architect, key technical consultants, general contractor and key subcontractors.

Using IPD, project participants can overcome key organizational and contractual problems. The IPD approach to contracting aligns project objectives with the interests of key participants. IPD relies on participant selection, transparency and continuing dialog. Construction consumers might consider rethinking their contracting strategies to share more fully in the benefits. The IPD approach creates an organization with the ability to apply Lean Project Delivery (LPD) principles and practices.

=== Commercial arrangements that support IPD and Lean Project Delivery ===
There are at least five principal forms of contract that support lean construction

- Job Order Contracting (JOC) uses explicit lean construction principles. JOC requires a long-term multi-party agreement, a collaborative environment, and a common data environment as signified by a locally researched detailed unit price book. More specifically JOC includes; direct owner leadership, adaptation of process to organizational requirements, locally researched, fully transparent and verifiable construction cost data, full regulatory compliance and auditability, focus upon programmatic processes applied to all associated construction, repair, renovation, or maintenance projects and work orders, collaborative and scalable cloud technology and the proactive integration of construction planning, procurement, and project delivery with a focus on value outcomes for all participants and stakeholders
- Integrated Form of Agreement (IFoA) uses explicit lean construction principles. Sutter Health in Sacramento developed Integrated Form of Agreement for Lean Project Delivery for use on healthcare projects in and around California.
- ConsensusDocs300 is a derivative of IFoA. ConsensusDocs offers contracts on Tri-Party Agreement for Integrated Project Delivery, Building Information Modeling (BIM) Addendum, and Green Building Addendum projects.
- "AIA Document C191™–2009 is a standard form multi-party agreement through which the owner, architect, contractor [etc] execute a single agreement for the design, construction and commissioning of a project." The American Institute of Architects (AIA) provides a list of Integrated Project Delivery system distributors.
- In the UK, PPC2000 is publicized by the Association of Consultant Architects.
- In Australia, the Lean Construction Institute has collaborated with the Alliancing Association of Australasia (AAA) around the topics of alliancing agreements and collaborative contracts.

Other papers explain Integrated Project Delivery (IPD) and IFoA. PPC2000, IFoA and 'alliancing agreements' were among the topics discussed at the 'Lean in the Public Sector' (LIPS) conference held in 2009.

== Practical applications of lean construction ==
In America, Job Order Contracting (JOC) uses explicit lean construction principles. JOC requires a long-term multi-party agreement, a collaborative environment, and a common data environment as signified by a locally researched detailed unit price book. More specifically JOC includes; direct owner leadership, adaptation of process to organizational requirements, locally researched, fully transparent and verifiable construction cost data, full regulatory compliance and auditability, focus upon programmatic processes applied to all associated construction, repair, renovation, or maintenance projects and work orders, collaborative and scalable cloud technology and the proactive integration of construction planning, procurement, and project delivery with a focus on value outcomes for all participants and stakeholders

In the UK, a major R&D project, Building Down Barriers, was launched in 1997 to adapt the Toyota Production System for use in the construction sector. The resulting supply chain management toolset was tested and refined on two pilot projects and the comprehensive and detailed process-based toolset was published in 2000 as the Building Down Barriers Handbook of Supply Chain Management-The Essentials. The project demonstrated very clearly that lean thinking would only deliver major performance improvements if the construction sector learned from the extensive experience of other business sectors. Lean thinking must become the way that all the firms in the design and construction supply chain co-operate with each other at a strategic level that over-arches individual projects. In the aerospace sector, these long-term supply-side relationships are called a Virtual Company, in other business sectors they are called an Extended Lean Enterprise.

The UK Building Down Barriers Handbook of Supply Chain Management-The Essentials states that: "The commercial core of supply chain management is setting up long-term relationships based on improving the value of what the supply chain delivers, improving quality and reducing underlying costs through taking out waste and inefficiency. This is the opposite of 'business as usual' in the construction sector, where people do things on project after project in the same old inefficient ways, forcing each other to give up profits and overhead recovery in order to deliver at what seems the market price. What results is a fight over who keeps any of the meagre margins that result from each project, or attempts to recoup 'negative margins' through 'claims', The last thing that receives time or energy in this desperate, project-by-project gladiatorial battle for survival is consideration of how to reduce underlying costs or improve quality".

== Differences between LC and project management approaches ==
There are many differences between the lean construction (LC) approach and the Project Management Institute (PMI) approach to construction. These include:

- Managing the interaction between activities and combined effects of dependence and variation, is a first concern in lean construction because their interactions highly affects the time and cost of projects (Howell, 1999); in comparison, these interactions are not considered in PMI.
- In lean construction, optimization efforts focus on making work flow reliable; in contrast PMI focuses on improving productivity of each activity which can make errors and reducing quality and result in rework.
- The project is structured and managed as a value generating process (value is defined as satisfying customer requirements); while PMI considers less cost as value.
- In the lean approach, downstream stakeholders are involved in front end planning and design through cross functional teams (Ballard, LPDS, 2000). PMI doesn't consider this issue.
- In lean construction, project control has the job of execution (Ballard, PhD thesis, 2000); whereas, control in PMI method relies on variance detection after-the-fact.
- In the lean approach, pull techniques govern the flow of information and materials, from upstream to downstream; with PMI, push techniques govern the release of information and materials.
- Capacity and inventory are adjusted to absorb variation (Mura). Feedback loops, included at every level, help ensure minimal inventories and rapid system response; in comparison, PMI doesn't consider adjustments.
- Lean construction tries to mitigate variation in every aspect (product quality, rate of work) and manage the remaining variation, while PMI doesn't consider variation mitigation and management.
- Lean approach tries to make continuous improvements in the process, workflows and product; whereas PMI approach doesn't pay that much attention to continuous improvement.
- In lean construction, decision making is distributed in design production control systems; by comparison, in PMI decision making is centered to one manager some times.
- Lean construction tries to increase transparency between the stakeholders, managers and labourers, in order to know the impact of their work on the whole project; on the other hand, PMI doesn't consider transparency in its methods.
- In lean construction a buffer of sound assignments is maintained for each crew or production unit; in contrast, PMI method doesn't consider a backlog for crews.
- Lean construction is developing new forms of commercial contracts to give incentives to suppliers for reliable work flow and optimization at the deliverable-to-the-client level; while PMI doesn't have such policy.
- Lean construction production system design resists the tendency toward local suboptimization, however, PMI persists on optimizing each activity.
- The PMI-driven approach only considers managing a project at the macro-level. This is necessary but not sufficient for the success of projects. Lean Construction encompasses Project and Production Management, and formally recognizes that any successful project undertaking will inevitably involve the interaction between project and production management. (Abdelhamid et al. 2008)

== Bibliography ==
- Abdelhamid (2007). Lean Construction Principles. Graduate class offering at Michigan State University. Lean Construction - Introduction
- Abdelhamid, T., S. (2004). "The Self-Destruction and Renewal of Lean Construction Theory: A Prediction From Boyd's Theory". Proceedings of the 12th Annual Conference of the International Group for Lean Construction, 03-6 August 2004, Helsingør, Denmark.
- Abdelhamid, T.S., El-Gafy, M., and Salem, O. (2008). "Lean Construction: Fundamentals And Principles." American Professional Constructor Journal.
- Ballard, G. and Howell, G. (1994a). "Implementing Lean Construction: Stabilizing Work Flow." Proceedings of the 2nd Annual Meeting of the International Group for Lean Construction, Santiago, Chile.
- Ballard, G. and Howell, G. (1994b). "Implementing Lean Construction: Improving Performance Behind the Shield." Proceedings of the 2nd Annual Meeting of the International Group for Lean Construction, Santiago, Chile.
- Ballard, G. and Howell, G. (1998). "Shielding Production: Essential Step in Production Control". Journal of Construction Engineering and Project Management, Vol. 124, No. 1, pp. 11 – 17.
- Ballard, Glenn; Howell, Gregory A. (19–21 March 2003). "Competing Construction Management Paradigms" (PDF). Proceedings of the 2003 ASCE Construction Research Congress. Honolulu, Hawaii. Archived from the original (PDF) on 29 June 2010.
- Ballard, Glenn (22–24 April 1994). "The Last Planner" (PDF). Northern California Construction Institute Spring Conference. Monterey, CA: Lean Construction Instsitute. Archived from the original (PDF) on 29 June 2010.
- Ballard, Glenn (2000). Last Planner™ System of Production Control (PDF) (Ph.D.). UK: University of Birmingham. Archived from the original (PDF) on 4 September 2012.
- Ballard, Glenn (2000b). "Lean Project Delivery Systems." LCI white paper-8, (Revision 1)
- Bertelsen, S. (2003a). "Complexity – Construction in a New Perspective". Proceedings of the 11th Annual Meeting of the International Group for Lean Construction, Blacksburg, Virginia, USA.
- Bertelsen, S. (2003b). "Construction as a Complex System", Proceedings of the 11th Annual Meeting of the International Group for Lean Construction, Blacksburg, Virginia.
- Bertselen, S. and Koskela, L. (2002). "Managing The Three Aspects Of Production In Construction." Proceedings of the 10th Conference of the International Group for Lean Construction, Gramado, Brazil, August 6–8.
- Cain, C. T. (2003). ISBN 0-415-28965-3. 'Building Down Barriers-A Guide to Construction Best Practice'. A simple guidebook explaining supply chain management and lean thinking, primarily aimed at the demand-side client.
- Cain, C. T. (2004b). 'Performance Measurement for Construction Profitability'. ISBN 1-4051-1462-2. A detailed action-learning guidebook aimed at supply-side construction firms (including trades contractors) explaining why performance measurement is the key to lean construction.
- Cain, C.T. (2004a). ISBN 1-4051-1086-4. 'Profitable Partnering for Lean Construction'. A detailed action-learning guidebook that explains how to set up the extended lean enterprises that are the essential first step towards lean construction. The book provides case history evidence that the approach advocated can deliver savings of over 30% and explains what clients need to do differently in order to enable lean construction to flourish.
- FMI/CMAA (2006). "Sixth Annual Survey of Owners" (PDF). Construction Management Association of America. Archived from the original (PDF) on 4 March 2016.
- Fernández-Solís, J. L. (2008). The systemic nature of the construction industry. Architectural Engineering and Design Management, 4(1), 31–46.
- Fernández-Solís, J. L., Porwal, V., Lavy, S., Shafaat, A., Rybkowski, Z. K., Son, K., & Lagoo, N. (2012). Survey of motivations, benefits, and implementation challenges of last planner system users. Journal of construction engineering and management, 139(4), 354–360.
- Fernandez-Solis, J. L. (2013). Building construction: A deterministic non-periodic flow–A case study of chaos theories in tracking production flow. Architectural Engineering and Design Management, 9(1), 21–48.
- Fernández-Solís, J. L., & Rybkowski, Z. K. (2012). A theory of waste and value. International Journal of Construction Project Management, 4(2), 89.
- Fernández-solís, J. L., & Arch, B. (2009). How the Construction Industry does differ from manufacturing?.
- Fernández-Solís, J. L., Rybkowski, Z. K., Xiao, C., Lü, X., & Chae, L. S. (2015). General contractor's project of projects–a meta-project: understanding the new paradigm and its implications through the lens of entropy. Architectural Engineering and Design Management, 11(3), 213–242.
- Fernández-Solís, J. L. (2009). An Application of Popper's Method of Conjectures and Refutations to the Critique of Emerging Construction Theories. Lean Construction Journal.
- Gleeson, F. and Townend J. (2007). "Lean construction in the corporate world of the U.K. construction industry", University of Manchester, School of Mechanical, Aerospace, Civil and Construction Engineering.
- Howell, Gregory A. (1999). "What is Lean Construction" (PDF). Proceedings IGLC-7. Lean Construction Institute. pp. 1–10. Archived from the original (PDF) on 20 March 2013.
- Koskela, L. (1992). "Application of the New Production Philosophy to Construction". Technical Report # 72, Center for Integrated Facility Engineering, Department of Civil Engineering, Stanford University, CA. www.leanconstruction.org/pdf/Koskela-TR72.pdf 10 March 07
- Koskela, Lauri (2000). An Exploration towards a Production Theory and its Application to Construction (PDF) (Ph.D.). Finland: VTT Technical Research Centre of Finland.
- Koskela, L. and Howell, G., (2002). "The Underlying Theory of Project Management is Obsolete." Proceedings of the PMI Research Conference, 2002, Pg. 293–302.
- Koskela, L.; Howell, G.; Ballard, G.; Tommelein, I. (2002). "Foundations of Lean Construction". In Best, Rick; de Valence, Gerard (eds.). Design and Construction: Building in Value. Oxford, UK: Butterworth-Heinemann, Elsevier. ISBN 0750651490.
- Kuhn, T. S. (1970). The Structure of Scientific Revolutions. University of Chicago Press.
- Lichtig, W. (2005). "Ten Key Decisions to A Successful Construction Project." American Bar Association, Forum on the Construction Industry, September 29–30, 2005, Toronto, Canada.
- Mastroianni, R. and Abdelhamid, T. S (2003). "The Challenge: The Impetus For Change To Lean Project Delivery". Proceedings of the 11th Annual Conference for Lean Construction, 22–24 July 2003, Blacksburg, Virginia, 610–621.
- Matthews, Owen; Howell, Gregory A. (April 2005). "Integrated Project Delivery An Example Of Relational Contracting" (PDF). Lean Construction. 2 (1): 46–61. ISSN 1555-1369. Archived from the original (PDF) on 19 February 2012.
- Owen Matthews, Gregory A. Howell, and Panagiotis Mitropoulos (2003). Aligning The Lean Organization: A Contractual Approach". Proceedings of the 11th conference of the international group for lean construction, Blacksburg, Virginia, 22–24 July 2003.
- Porwal, V., Fernández-Solís, J., Lavy, S., & Rybkowski, Z. K. (2010, July). Last planner system implementation challenges. In Proceedings of the 18 Annual Conference International Group for Lean Construction, IGLC (Vol. 18, pp. 548–54).
- Rybkowski, Z. K., Zhou, X., Lavy, S., & Fernández-Solís, J. (2012). Investigation into the nature of productivity gains observed during the Airplane Game lean simulation. Lean Construction Journal.
- Rybkowski, Z. K., Munankami, M., Gottipati, U., Lavy, S., & Fernández-Solis, J. (2011). Impact of cost constraints on aesthetic ranking following Target Value Design exercises.
- Salem, O; Solomon, J; Genaidy, A; Luegring, M (October 2005). "Site Implementation and Assessment of Lean Construction Techniques" (PDF). Lean Construction. 2 (2): 1–21. doi:10.60164/e2i9e2h1d. ISSN 1555-1369.
- Sowards, Dennis (June 2004). "5S's that would make any CEO Happy". Contractor Magazine.
