= Design–build =

Construction project delivery system

Design–build (or design/build or design and build, and abbreviated D–B, D/B or D&B accordingly), also known as alternative delivery, is a project delivery system used in the construction industry. It is a method to deliver a project in which the design and construction services are contracted by a single entity known as the design–builder or design–build contractor. It can be subdivided into architect-led design–build (ALDB, sometimes known as designer-led design–build) and contractor-led design–build.

In contrast to "design–bid–build" (or "design–tender"), design–build relies on a single point of responsibility contract and is used to minimize risks for the project owner and to reduce the delivery schedule by overlapping the design phase and construction phase of a project.

Design–build also has a single point responsibility. The design-build contractor is responsible for all work on the project, so the client can seek legal remedies for any fault from one party.

The traditional approach for construction projects consists of the appointment of a designer on one side, and the appointment of a contractor on the other side. The design–build procurement route changes the traditional sequence of work. It answers the client's wishes for a single point of responsibility in an attempt to reduce risks and overall costs. Although the use of subcontractors to complete more specialized work is common, the design-build contractor remains the primary contact and primary force behind the work. It is now commonly used in many countries and forms of contracts are widely available.

Design–build is sometimes compared to the master builder approach, one of the oldest forms of construction procedure. Comparing design–build to the traditional method of procurement, the authors of Design-build Contracting Handbook noted that: "from a historical perspective the so-called traditional approach is actually a very recent concept, only being in use approximately 150 years. In contrast, the design–build concept—also known as the "master builder" concept—has been reported as being in use for over four millennia."

Although the Design-Build Institute of America (DBIA) takes the position that design–build can be led by a contractor, a designer, a developer or a joint venture, as long as a design–build entity holds a single contract for both design and construction, some architects have suggested that architect-led design–build is a specific approach to design–build.

Design-build plays an important role in pedagogy, both at universities and in independently organised events such as Rural Studio or ArchiCamp.

== Design–build contractor ==
The "design–builder" is often a general contractor, but in many cases a project is led by a design professional (architect, engineer, architectural technologist or other professional designers). Some design–build firms employ professionals from both the design and construction sector. Where the design–builder is a general contractor, the designers are typically retained directly by the contractor. Partnership or a joint venture between a design firm and a construction firm may be created on a long-term basis or for one project only.

Until 1979, the AIA American Institute of Architects' code of ethics and professional conduct prohibited their members from providing construction services. However today many architects in the United States and elsewhere aspire to provide integrated design and construction services, and one approach towards this goal is design–build. The AIA has acknowledged that design–build is becoming one of the main approaches to construction. In 2003, the AIA endorsed "The architect's guide to design–build services", which was written to help their members acting as design–build contractors. This publication gives guidance through the different phases of the process: design services, contracts, management, insurances, and finances.

== Contractor-led design–build projects: the architect's role ==
On contractor-led design–build projects, management is structured so that the owner works directly with a contractor who, in turn, coordinates subcontractors. Architects contribute to contractor-led design–build projects in one of several ways, with varying degrees of responsibility (where "A/E" in each diagram represents the architect/engineer):

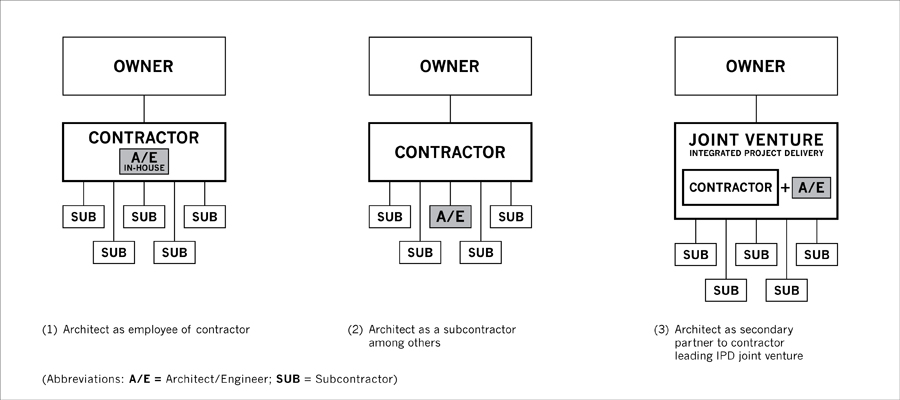
Three models of contractor-led design–build

1. Architect as employee of contractor: The architect works for the contractor as an in-house employee. The architect still bears professional risk and is likely to have less control than in other contractor-led design–build approaches.
2. Architect as a subcontractor: Here, the architect is one of the many subcontractors on the team led by the contractor. The architect bears similar professional risk but still with little control.
3. Architect as second party in contractor-led integrated project delivery (IPD): The architect and contractor work together in a joint venture, both coordinating the subcontractors to get the project built. The building owner has a single contract with this joint venture. The contractor leads the joint venture so in supervising the subs, the architect might defer to the contractor. The architect bears the same risk as they do in the traditional approach but has more control in IPD, even if they were to defer to the contractor.

== Architect-led design–build projects ==
Architect-led design–build projects are those in which interdisciplinary teams of architects and building trades professionals collaborate in an agile management process, where design strategy and construction expertise are seamlessly integrated, and the architect, as owner-advocate, project-steward and team-leader, ensures high fidelity between project aims and outcomes. In architect-led design–build projects, the architect works directly with the owner (the client), acts as the designer and builder, coordinating a team of consultants, subcontractors and materials suppliers throughout the project lifecycle.

Architects lead design–build projects in several ways, with varying degrees of responsibility (where "A/E" in each diagram represents the architect/engineer):

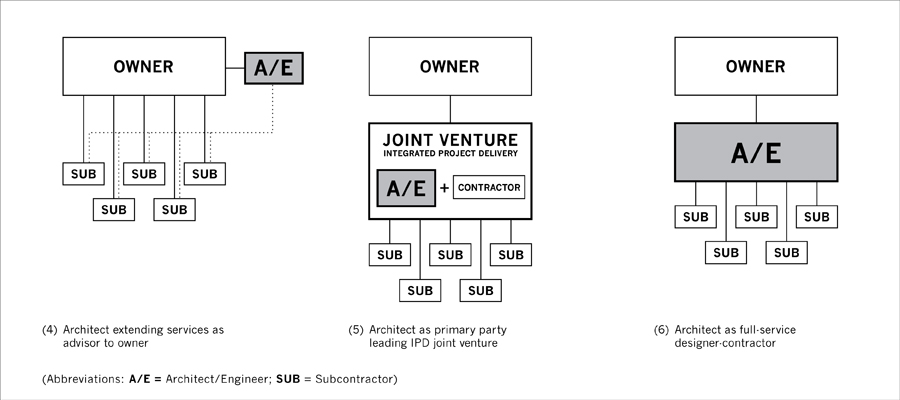
Three models of architect-led design–build

1. Architect as provider of extended services: Contracted to the owner, the architect extends his or her services beyond the design phase, taking responsibility for managing the subcontractors on behalf of the owner. The architect bears similar risk but has more control over the project than in the traditional approach or on contractor-led design–build projects.
2. Architect as primary party in architect-led integrated project delivery (IPD): Again, as in working together in a joint venture, both coordinating the subcontractors to get the project built. Again, the building owner has a single contract with this joint venture. This time, the architect leads the joint venture so in supervising the subs, the contractor might defer to the architect. The architect might bear more risk than they do in the traditional approach but risk is shared with the owner and the contractor, as outlined in their agreement. An alternative approach to effectuating this delivery structure is for the architect to contract directly with the owner to design and build the project, and then to subcontract the procurement and construction responsibilities to its allied general contractor, who enters into further subcontracts with the trades. This is a difference in form, rather than in substance, because the business and legal terms of the agreement between the architect and the general contractor may be the same regardless of whether they are characterized as a joint venture or as a subcontract. It is the "flip side of the coin" of the contractor-led approach described above in which the general contractor subcontracts the design to the architect.
3. Architect as full service leader of design build process: Contracted to the owner, the architect offers full service to the owner, taking responsibility for managing the subcontractors, consultants and vendors, and involving them throughout the project, start to finish, from design through construction. The architect's role shifts during the project, from designer to site supervisor (effectively taking the role of a general contractor), but monitors the project vision, and is able to call upon subcontractors' construction expertise throughout. The architect bears the greatest risk but also has more control over the project than in either the traditional approach, or in the contractor-led and other architect-led design–build projects.

== Contracts ==
A single set of integrated contracts combining design and construction responsibilities, rather than two discrete contracts for each, acknowledges the interdependence of the architects' and construction trades' project responsibilities, and reduces the likelihood of disputes.

== Design–build institutes ==
In 1993, the Design-Build Institute of America (DBIA) was formed. Its membership is composed of design and construction industry professionals as well as project owners. DBIA promotes the value of design–build project delivery and teaches the effective integration of design and construction services to ensure success for owners and design and construction practitioners. The Design-Build Institute of America is an organization that defines, teaches and promotes best practices in design–build.

The Canadian Design-Build Institute (CDBI) describes itself as "The recognized voice of Design-Build practitioners in Canada, promoting and enhancing the proper use of Design-Build method of procurement and contracting".

=== Advocacy ===
Not all design–build projects are alike. Here, there is a distinction between design–build projects led by contractors and those led by architects. Architect-led Design Build is a form of 'design–build' that, according to the DBIA, has been rapidly gaining market share in the United States over the past 15 years. The Design Build Institute of America describes the design–build process as follows:

Taking singular responsibility, the design–build team is accountable for cost, schedule and performance, under a single contract and with reduced administrative paperwork, clients can focus on the project rather than managing disparate contracts. And, by closing warranty gaps, building owners also virtually eliminate litigation claims.

The DBIA's 2005 chart shows the uptake of design–build methods in non-residential design and construction in the United States.

Architect-led design–build is sometimes known by the more generic name "designer-led design–build". Although employed primarily by architects, architectural technologists and other architectural professions, the design–build structure works similarly for interior design projects led by an interior designer who is not an architect, and also for engineering projects where the design–build team is led by a professional structural, civil, mechanical or other engineers. In addition, it is common for the design professional who leads the design–build team to create a separate corporation or similar business entity through which the professional performs the construction and other related non-professional services.

In 2011, design–build continued to gain ground as a significant trend in design and construction.

In March 2011, industry consultants ZweigWhite published "Design-Bid-Build meets the opposition". In it, they suggest that while Design-Bid-Build "still rules", the traditional approach is losing favor as "alternative project delivery methods threaten [the] design-bid-build model." While not referencing the architect-led design–build approach specifically, the article states that D/B already accounts for 27% of projects, according to their 2010 Project Management Survey and goes on to argue that,

The emerging trends in delivery seem to point to a return to the primordial concept of the masterbuilder, as exemplified by D/B and IPD [Integrated Project Delivery].

According to the DBIA, the design–build approach offers advantages to owners, including: "One team, one contract, one unified flow of work from initial concept through completion."

== Debate on the merits of design–build vs. design–bid–build ==
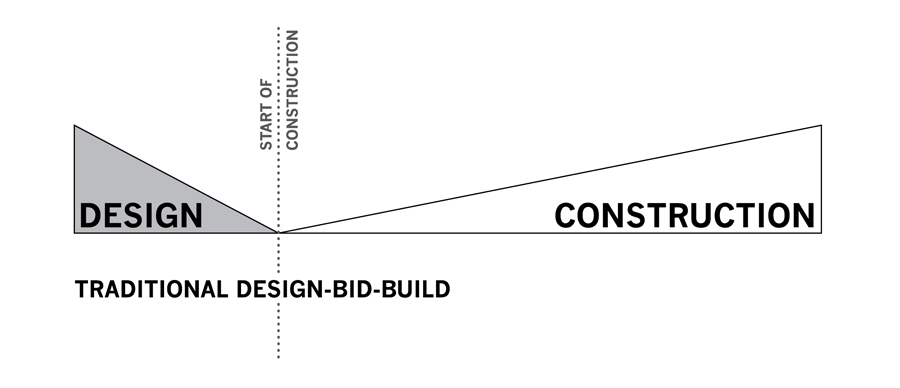
Design-Bid-Build project timeline

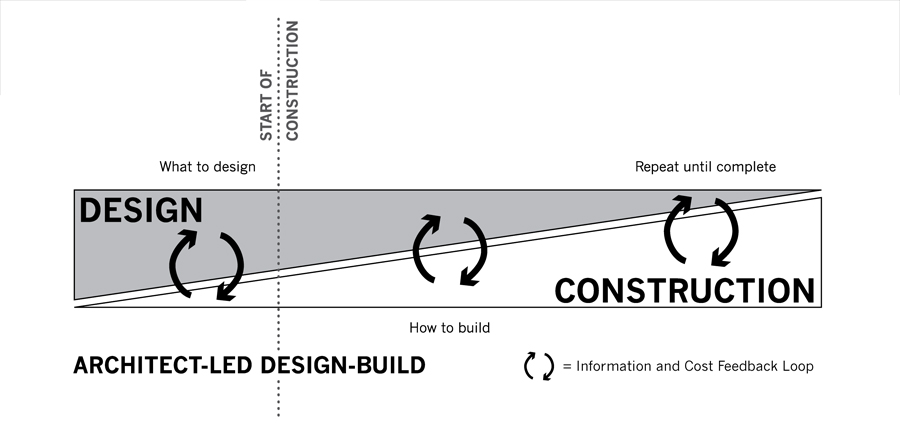
ALDB project timeline

The rise of design–build project delivery has threatened the traditional hierarchies and silos of the design and construction industry. As a result, a debate has emerged over the value of design–build as a method of project delivery.

Critics of the design–build approach claim that design–build limits the clients' involvement in the design and allege that contractors often make design decisions outside their area of expertise. They also suggest that a designer—rather than a construction professional—is a better advocate for the client or project owner and/or that by representing different perspectives and remaining in their separate spheres, designers and builders ultimately create better buildings.

Proponents of design–build counter that design–build saves time and money for the owner, while providing the opportunity to achieve innovation in the delivered facility. They note that value is added because design-build brings value engineering into the design process at the onset of a project. Design–build allows the contractor, engineers and specialty trade contractors (subcontractors) to propose best-value solutions for various construction elements before the design is complete. Design–build brings all members of a project team together early in the process to identify and address issues of cost, schedule and constructability. Proponents suggest that as a result, design-build alleviates conflict between architects and contractors and reduces owner risk for design errors. They argue that once design is finalized and construction begins, the greatest opportunity to achieve cost savings has already been lost, and the potential for design errors is greater, leading to change orders that create cost growth and schedule delays. Proponents note that design–build allows owners to avoid being placed directly between the architect/engineer and the contractor. Under design–bid–build, the owner takes on significant risks because of that position. Design–build places the responsibility for design errors and omissions on the design–builder, relieving the owner of major legal and managerial responsibilities. The burden for these costs and associated risks are transferred to the design–build team.

The cost and schedule reduction and decreased litigation associated with design–build project delivery have been demonstrated repeatedly. Researches on Selecting Project Delivery Systems by Victor Sanvido and Mark Konchar of Pennsylvania State University found that design–build projects are delivered 33.5% faster than projects that are designed and built under separate contracts (design-bid-build). Sanvido and Konchar also showed that design–build projects are constructed 12% faster* and have a unit cost that is 6.1% lower than design-bid-build projects. Similar cost and time savings were found in a comparison study of design–build, and design-bid-build for the water/wastewater construction industry, a peer-reviewed paper authored by Smith Culp Consulting that will be published in July 2011 by the American Society of Civil Engineers. A benchmarking and claims study by Victor O. Schinnerer, one of the world's largest firms underwriting professional liability and specialty insurance programs, found that, from 1995 to 2004, only 1.3% of claims against A/E firms were made by design–build contractors. Advantages have been summarized as:

- Efficiency: Typically led by contractors, 'design–build' has evolved as an efficient way to deliver projects primarily where the building project goals are straightforward, either constrained by budget, or the outcome is prescribed by functional requirements (for example, a highway, sports facility, or brewery). Construction industry commentators have described design–build as a high performance 'construction project delivery system', a dynamic approach to making buildings that presents an alternative to the traditional design-bid-build approach.
- Single-source: Design–build is growing because of the advantages of single-source management: Unlike traditional design-bid-build, it allows for the owner to contract with just one party who acts as a single point of contact, is responsible for delivering the project and coordinates the rest of the team. Depending on the phasing of the project, there may be multiple sequential contracts between the owner and the design–builder. The owner benefits because if something turns out to be wrong with the project, there is a single entity that is responsible for fixing the problem, rather than a separate designer and constructor each blaming the other.

=== Advantages for less-prescriptive projects ===
Architect-led design–build is suited primarily to less prescriptive architectural projects (private residences, non-profit institutions, museums), for the efficiencies it yields and the sophisticated design interpretation it affords, particularly:

- Where the primary project goals are design-driven or visionary rather than prescribed by budgetary constraint or functional requirements
- Where the project is specifically "Capital A"-artistically/creatively driven, in a way that traditionally yields the highest level of cost overruns.
- Where the efficiencies of design–build approach and an architect's interpretive skill are equally important

=== Recursive knowledge ===
The process and the knowledge it produces is recursive: Since subcontractors are engaged early and often in an architect-led design build project, to assess efficiencies, opportunity costs, payback rates and quality options. Their input informs overall design decisions from the outset. Cost-benefit is also a constant consideration that informs design decisions from the outset. Building performance is measured early too, so that trade offs between budget, schedule, functionality and usability can inform specification and continuous refinement of the design.

Architects engaged in this process understand and stay up to date with the potential of modern technology and materials available to building professionals, and translate what they learn into their design work. This knowledge can be shared with other project teams, throughout a studio, or to the profession, and can become an active source of insight in its own right.

== Growth of design–build method ==
A 2011 study analyzing the design–build project delivery method in the United States shows design–build was used on about 40 percent of non-residential construction projects in 2010, a ten percent increase since 2005. The study was commissioned by the Design-Build Institute of America (DBIA) and was completed by RSMeans Reed Construction Data Market Intelligence.

A study from the US Department of Transportation claims that: "Design-build delivery has been steadily increasing in the U.S. public building sector for more than 10 years, but it is still termed experimental in transportation. To date, under Special Experimental Project 14 (SEP-14) the FHWA has approved the use of design–build in more than 150 projects, representing just over half of the States. The European countries visited have used design–build delivery for a longer time than the United States and provided the scan team with many valuable insights. The primary lessons learned on this scan tour relate to the types of projects using design–build, the use of best-value selection, percentage of design in the solicitation, design and construction administration, third-party risks, the use of warranties, and the addition of maintenance and operation to design–build contracts."

== Criticisms of design–build ==
During the design–build procedure, the contractor is deciding on design issues as well as issues related to cost, profits and time exigencies. Whilst the traditional method of construction procurement dissociates the designers from the contractors' interests, design–build does not. On these grounds it is considered that the design–build procedure is poorly adapted to projects that require complex designs for technical, programmatic or aesthetic purposes. If the designer/architect is 'kept' by the construction company, they probably will never push the envelope as to what might be possible. A notable design–build project that received significant criticism, not only for excessive cost but for environmental issues, was the Belmont Learning Center. The scandal involved alleged contaminated soil that caused significant delays and massive cost overruns. In Los Angeles, District Attorney Steve Cooley, who investigated the Los Angeles Unified School District's Belmont project, produced a final investigative report, released March 2003. This report concluded that the design–build process caused a number of issues relating to the Belmont scandal:

- Design–build does not make use of competitive bidding where prospective builders bid on the same design.
- Criteria to select contractor are subjective and difficult to evaluate and to justify later.
- The design and price selected arouses public suspicion, true or not.
- This can lead to loss of public confidence.
- The design brief is subject to different interpretations from both the client and contractor, creating a conflict of interest.

It concluded the "design–build" approach and "mixed-use concept" together caused controversy, uncertainty, and complexity of the Belmont project which helped increase the potential for project failure. While the Belmont investigation cleared the Los Angeles Unified School District of any criminal wrongdoing, the task force recommends strict oversight, including written protocols, a vigorous Office of the Inspector General, and other recommendations if it decides to continue to use the design–build approach. During the period in question, the ex-Superintendent of LAUSD, Ramon C. Cortines, working with the LAUSD Board of Education, whose president is Monica Garcia, actively tried to cut the Office of Inspector General by 75% (compromising on 25%) and subsequently removed the Inspector General Jerry Thornton after he produced critical audits that showed misuse of construction funds.

Others have argued that architect-led design–build still does:

- Typical project management issues (establishing liability, writing contracts, scoping estimates and schedule) or
- Variation across different states' licensing laws or
- Conflict of interest and ethical issues

It also imposes:

- Greater business and financial risks associated with architect taking on general contractor responsibilities
- Changes to the way architects do business, so they
  - Establish a construction company as a separate corporation that signs a separate construction contract, so they are able to insure and simplify liability insurance coverage
  - Either they have, or are able to acquire, the skills of a design–builder
  - Recognize the parties' different incentives
  - Modify how they prepare Contract Documents, relying more on performance specifications than they do currently, to facilitate substitutions for the benefit of the constructor.

== Project examples ==
Examples of contractor-led design–build projects include:

- Dena'ina Civic & Convention Center, Anchorage, AK, Neeser Construction, Inc.: In 2010, it won the 2010 DBIA Design Build Merit Award for a public sector project over $50 million.
- Walter Cronkite School of Journalism and Mass Communication: Phoenix, AZ, Ehrlich Architects. In 2009, it won the 2009 DBIA National Design Build Award for a public sector project over $25 million.
- Federal Law Enforcement Training Center Dormitory, North Charleston, SC, The Korte Company. In 2012, it won the 2012 DBIA Design Build Merit Award for a public sector project over $15 million.

== See also ==
- Architectural management
- Design–bid–build
