= Nation (nightclub) =

Nightclub in Washington, D.C, United States

Nation (formerly The Capitol Ballroom) was a live music/club venue, located at 1015 Half Street SE, in the Navy Yard/Near Southeast neighborhood, of Washington, D.C.

It was larger than any other club in the D.C. area, with two levels indoors and a multi-level outdoor patio. The large rooms, sound, and lighting systems made it a popular destination for the rave, House, drum & bass and gay communities.

== History ==
Built in 1924, the building initially comprised the front entrance of what became Nation, serving as a carriage factory. The building later expanded as it changed hands, at one point serving as a warehouse for the military and finally as a factory for Hurley Boiler before it ceased operations. The club first opened its doors as The Capitol Ballroom in August 1995, with The Ramones, Björk and Lords of Acid being among the first acts to take the stage. The club was located near the other seminal Navy Yard club called Tracks (1111 First St, S.E.), a large gay club at the time. The Capitol Ballroom began holding "Buzz" nights on Fridays, which hosted a number of national and international talent in dance music. It eventually became one of the country's largest weekly dance party/rave hybrid. On Saturdays, the party "Industrial Revolution" hosted by D.C. DJ "Mohawk" Adam brought industrial and dark electronic acts. Nation became recognized locally for highly diverse concert events. Nation was also recognized on a national and even international level for its three weekly DJ and theme driven nightclub parties.

Due to its large size, The Capitol Ballroom did host many top-selling musical acts during its four-year tenure, but it also had a sparse schedule, as the neighborhood, located in the area of Near Southeast in D.C., was notorious for its high crime rate in the mid-1990s. In 1999, The Capitol Ballroom changed management and became known as Nation. Nation soon became very popular after another nearby dance club Tracks closed on November 6, 1999.

Nation was managed by Primacy Companies, Inc. On July 17, 2006, the club closed after longtime lot owners Potomac Investment Properties decided to move forward with a planned 400,000-square-foot (37,000 m^{2}) office building on the site. In July 2007, Potomac Investment sold the site to Opus East for $41.5 million, and in spring 2008 construction began on the office building. The area is now considered part of the "Ballpark District" due to the fact the Nationals Park stadium has been built two blocks away. As of January 2010, Opus East is insolvent and construction has been halted.

== Notable events ==
Nation had been host to hundreds of bands and solo acts, from David Bowie to Rage Against the Machine. In 1996, the venue hosted the Warped Tour marking the only time the annual event was held indoors. It was originally scheduled to be held at Merriweather Post Pavilion. The venue also held the "Superbowl of Hardcore" a day-long concert featuring many of the top hardcore bands and punk bands.

The final event at Nation featured Mindless Self Indulgence on July 17, 2006.

Technical design and production staff at Nation included original Lighting Designer John Niederhauser (JSN Design), Lighting Director Kevin W Clark, Production Managers Joe "Shaggy" Conroy, Dylan Overstreet, Production Assistant Jeff Nightingale, and Stagehands "Seal", "Mouse", and "Gwydo" who ran lights for concerts. The main room was equipped with a 40-foot (12 m) stage, a large mezzanine walkway, and a third level skybox was added in 2000 for VIPs. The lighting fixtures in the main room consisted of 8 Studio Spots, 12 Studio colors, 72 par-cans, 6 lekos, 5 Studio 250s, and 6 MAC 500 moving heads; all controlled by a Hog 1000 with the pars and lekos going through a leprechaun dimmer rack. The main rig included a 15 1/2-foot-diameter (4.7 m) Truss Ring, with a 4-foot mirror ball hung in the center. Ring was hung on 4 chain motors, and one for the raising and lowering of mirror ball, running at 32 fpm. This allowed the ring and ball to travel the 35 ft height of the space, very quickly. Once the ring was at a preset height over the dance floor, by running the downstage motors up and the upstage motors down, the ring was tilted to a 50-degree angle in 4 beats. This truss move tilted the ring at 1 foot per second (64 fpm). Video was mixed and processed through an Edirol v-4 mixer and fed to the upstage, downstage, circular, and rectangular trusses for projection.

The sound consisted of EAW cabinets and drivers, amplified by Crown, and fed by a post-processor in the DJ booth that received signal via a Pioneer 500 mixer or, if the talent on hand preferred something a little more "old-school", a Rane mixer. Front of house sound was managed by contracted third parties, usually Springfield Sound or MSI.

Nation hosted a variety of events, such as concerts, sporting events, trade shows, and even a six-week run of The Rocky Horror Show. It was home to events such as "Alchemy/Alias" (Thursday), "Buzz (DC)," alternately "Sting" and "Cubik" after a brief move to Redwood Trust in Baltimore (Friday), and gay night "Velvet Nation" (Saturday).

"Alchemy" was one of the country's weekly goth/industrial nights. Tony Tribby led a team that created Alchemy and used Nation's multi-room layout to combine music ranging from industrial, ebm, goth, 80s, punk, electro-clash, trance, alternative into a package with a Goth aesthetic. Alchemy had hosted VNV Nation, Icon of Coil, Siouxsie and the Banshees, Juno Reactor, Shiny Toy Guns and others at their Thursday night event, and put on annual events such as Goth Prom in the Spring and Freaks United every July 4.

"Buzz (DC)," alternately "Sting" and "Cubik" hosted by Scott Henry and Lieven DeGeyndt, were named the country's top electronic dance music events numerous times by international publications such as Urb and BPM. Buzz/Sting and Cubik hosted the world's top electronic house, drum and bass, breakbeat and techno djs such as Paul Oakenfold, Tiësto, Sasha and Digweed, Dave Clarke, Dieselboy, Andy C, The Freestylers, The Chemical Brothers, The Crystal Method and Paul Van Dyk as well as live acts such as Rabbit in the Moon and The Prodigy.

Saturdays played host to Velvet Nation, a gay dance event. The event was respected as one of the top events of its kind in the US. For many years, circuit event DJs and talents such as Junior Vasquez, Abel Aguilera, Alyson Calagna, Mike Reeze, Manny Lehman, Susan Morabito, Tony Moran, Victor Calderone, The Pet Shop Boys, k.d. lang, and The Village People. Nation was also known for lavish theme parties, such as Madonnarama, a night of all Madonna music and video, The White Party, and a variety of Pride events.
