= Harry Humphry Mellon =

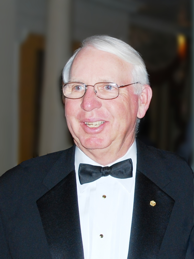
- Harry Mellon at the Gordian Group's 20th Anniversary dinner.
- Born: September 26, 1946 (age 79); San Mateo, California
- Branch: United States Army
- Service years: 1965–1986
- Rank: Lieutenant Colonel
- Awards: See Medals and Decorations below
- Other work: Created Job Order Contracting; Senior Vice President, CRSS, Inc.; Founder/CEO/Chairman of The Gordian Group, Inc.

Harry Humphry Mellon (born September 26, 1946) is a retired Lieutenant Colonel of the United States Army, American businessman, inventor of Job Order Contracting, entrepreneur, and founder and Chairman of The Gordian Group, Inc.

In 1982, Mellon conceived the idea of Job Order Contracting. He was working as the Chief Engineer at the Supreme Headquarters Allied Powers Europe (SHAPE) in Mons, Belgium. In 1985, Mellon implemented the Job Order Contracting concept for the U.S. Army, which was called the "Mellon Plan" at the time. Following implementation at the U.S. Army, Mellon moved the idea into the U.S. Air Force and Navy. In 1990, Mellon started The Gordian Group for the sole purpose of providing the services, software, data and documents that would make facility and infrastructure owners successful at Job Order Contracting.

== Early years ==
Mellon was born September 1946, in San Mateo, California to Commander Hugh and Margret Mellon, USN. The Mellons had five sons and a daughter of which Harry was the eldest. Mellon moved to Hawaii, Chicago and Guam before his family finally settled on Coronado Island in California. Mellon graduated from Coronado High School in 1964. Much to the disappointment of his father, a Navy officer and World War II POW, Mellon enlisted in the Army in 1965. Hugh Mellon's parting words to his son when dropping Mellon off to report for duty was, "Son, this is lowest day of your life, you can go no lower."

== Military service ==
Mellon completed basic training at Fort Polk, Louisiana and Engineer Officer Candidate School at Fort Belvoir, Virginia and was commissioned a second lieutenant at the age of 19. Mellon served in Vietnam as an Engineer Company Commander in the Mekong Delta. His primary mission was the construction of the Đồng Tâm Base Camp for the 9th Infantry Division. Following his service in Vietnam, Mellon was assigned to various Army installations including the Presidio of San Francisco. While serving at the Presidio in 1971, Mellon was responsible for coordinating the massive Federal Cleanup effort after the collision of two oil tankers under the Golden Gate Bridge. Following his service in San Francisco, Mellon attended San Diego State University, where he earned an undergraduate degree in Mathematics in 1973. Mellon was then assigned as the Resident Engineer for the Army Corps of Engineers at Langley Air Force Base, VA, where he was responsible for the timely construction of a number of facilities critical to the activation of the first squadron of F-15 fighter aircraft. While serving at Langley, Mellon earned a master's degree in business administration from George Washington University. Mellon was then selected for an appointment to the faculty of the Department of Mathematics at the United States Military Academy at West Point, NY. In preparation for that assignment, Mellon spent two years at Princeton University earning a master's degree in Civil Engineering. In 1978, Mellon joined the West Point faculty and taught Mathematics for three years. Following West Point, Mellon graduated from the Armed Forces Staff College and was assigned as the Chief Engineer, Supreme Headquarters Allied Powers Europe (SHAPE) in Mons, Belgium where he invented Job Order Contracting. In 1984, Mellon was reassigned as the Facilities Engineer for the United States Military Academy. That assignment was interrupted in January 1985 when Mellon was reassigned to Corps of Engineers Headquarters for the purpose of developing and implementing the Job Order Contracting process for the United States Department of Defense. Mellon retired from the U.S. Army in July 1986 after 21 years of active service.

== Job Order Contracting history ==
1982-1984: The Origins of JOC

Job Order Contracting (JOC) has become a multibillion-dollar industry focused on expedited construction procurement. Mellon invented Job Order Contracting in January 1982 as a way to solve dire repair and maintenance issues at SHAPE. SHAPE Headquarters was built in 1966 following France's decision to leave the military arm of NATO, thereby forcing headquarters to be moved from Versailles, France to Mons, Belgium. The entire process of construction was completed in six months.

When Mellon arrived at SHAPE, only two options to accomplish the needed repairs and upgrades existed: 1) Work with the in-house workforce who were extremely talented at smaller, single traded projects; 2) Contract out to the local community for the larger, more complex jobs. The process for contracting out stipulated competitive bidding for each requirement, regardless of size, as well as completing full design and specifications in several different languages. Typically, this process took about 12 to 14 months. The other problem that needed to be solved was a lack of control over contractors. Contractors were bidding low in order to win jobs and then making up the shortfall with claims and change orders.

The typical timeframe (12–14 months) was unacceptable, as the backlog of repairs and upgrades continued to grow along with pressure from senior officers to accomplish the work. A more responsive way of contracting out work had to be found, specifically, a solution for jobs ranging in value from $50,000 to $500,000. Mellon's senior staff provided invaluable insight and support in developing various options. That staff consisted of Lieutenant Colonel Hartmut Paul, German Army; Major John F. Miniclier, U.S. Army, Lieutenant Colonel John Baston, Royal Engineers and Chief Warrant Officer Jim Crowley, U.S. Army.

The idea of Job Order Contracts was born out of the concept of on-call contractors similar to the way architects and engineers were hired at the time for miscellaneous work. The main obstacle in procuring on-call contractors was the requirement to award all construction contracts to the lowest responsive bidder. Mellon and his staff looked at existing indefinite quantity/indefinite delivery contracts (IDIQ) being used at the time in which the owner defined the task and quantities and the contractor bids a price for each task. These contracts were often single traded and resulted in an unbalanced bid structure causing an owner to overpay for construction.

At that point, that they decided to do something unique in public contracting: the owner would set the price. For example: the owner would select a particular work task, such as installing a square yard of carpeting. The owner would then establish the price that they were willing to pay for installation of one square yard. The price would include the direct cost of materials, equipment, and labor. The owner would not include any profit or overhead in that price.

Mellon and his team developed a full collection of tasks, approximately 10,000, and then developed prices for each task. The idea was simple, let the contractor bid a markup to the task prices. Not a markup for each individual task price, but a single markup for all of the task prices. The lowest markup would be the lowest bid and the contractor that bid it would get the contract. The concept of the "open end construction contract" was first tested at SHAPE in 1982. The first contract was awarded to the Belgium firm Lixon, S.A.

1984-1986: The "Mellon Plan" becomes JOC

In 1984, Mellon was reassigned as the Facilities Engineer for the United States Military Academy at West Point. Upon arriving at West Point, Mellon noticed the same facility problems that existed at the SHAPE headquarters in Belgium. Since there were no open-ended construction procurement tools, Mellon was forced to use the traditional design/bid/construct model for all contract work. Colonel Bill Badger, USMA Engineer, always aiming to find methods to raise standards and make improvements, was Mellon's supervisor at West Point. Badger and Mellon shared the same frustrations of the standard contracting process. During the course of many discussions about their frustrations of the standard contracting process, Mellon shared the idea he used during his SHAPE project just a few years earlier.

In late November 1984, during the United States Army Corps of Engineers Worldwide Engineers' Conference in Philadelphia, Badger spoke to Brigadier General Jerry Helms, the Southwestern Division Engineer, about the SHAPE project and arranged a breakfast meeting between Mellon and Helms. Prior to the breakfast, Helms mentioned the idea to the Chief of Engineers, Lieutenant General Elvin R. "Vald" Heiberg. Heiberg joined the breakfast meeting with Mellon, Helms, and Badger. Mellon explained the concept of the SHAPE project to the group. Though they were attentive and patient throughout the meeting, Heiberg and Helms did not demonstrate a lot of emotion. Though they remained noncommittal, both Generals did agree that this was an idea worth pursuing sometime in the future.

Heiberg, while speaking later that day at the conference, announced that he had some prepared remarks but he would be putting those remarks aside because the answer to most of the questions people had was the "Mellon Plan." The audience looked around in an attempt to determine who was behind the "Mellon Plan." Sitting next to Mellon was a Corps of Engineers civilian, Jim Lovo. Lovo turned to Mellon, having met him only moments before, and asked, "You wouldn't happen to be the Mellon of the Mellon Plan?" Mellon responded, "Well, as a matter of fact, I probably am." Lovo wished Mellon luck with his new plan, and later became instrumental in the success of Job Order Contracting in the federal government.

Following the lunch and closing remarks of Heiberg, Mellon was approached by Major General Mark Sisinyak, who was the Director of Military Programs for the Office of the Chief of Engineers. Sisinyak ordered Mellon, "my office 8:00 a.m. Monday morning."

Mellon replied quickly, "Yes sir!"

1985: A Rough Start to JOC

General Sisinyak, made the decision that Monday morning to put together a taskforce to go to Europe in the early part of January 1985 to study the SHAPE project and to see how the process worked and what the results were. The task force gave a unanimous recommendation that the Corps of Engineers pursue adopting the same type of program. Sisinyak appointed Mellon to the task of implementing the "Mellon Plan" within the U.S. Army's facilities system, and assigned Mellon to the office adjacent his. A senior executive civilian, Chuck Smith, headed the management group under Sisinyak that Mellon worked with. Also working in that group were Jim Lovo, Pete Amquist and Dave Spivey.

The first order of business was to come up with a more suitable name than the "Mellon Plan." Open ended construction contract was not acceptable because no one in Washington would approve anything "open ended." Dave Spivey said, "You know, when a customer calls the Facility Engineer and issues a work request, the Army generates a job order for that work request, so why don't we call that contract a Job Order Contract?" That was the day, in January 1985, that the "Mellon Plan" became Job Order Contracting or JOC.

The first step in implementing JOC within the U.S. Army's facilities system was to develop a management plan. First, the team needed to determine if the process was legal and solicit support both on Capitol Hill and in the Pentagon. Next, they needed to designate a test base or bases for the concept. Finally, and most critical, they needed to develop the contract documents. Lovo was assigned to work directly with Mellon on the project and the two proceeded to execute the plan.

Mellon and Lovo prepared briefings for the Assistant Secretary of the Army for Research, Development, and Acquisition (SARDA), and the Assistant Secretary of the Army for Installations. Both resulted in strong support, but additional briefings to other Army staff were met with resistance. The Deputy Chief of Staff for Logistics, and, more specifically, the contracting community, felt very threatened by the idea of Job Order Contracting and resisted it. The resistance came from the notion that there would be a reduction in the number of contractual actions, thereby potentially impacting staff levels and ultimately impacting grading and promotions. Allegations were also made that Job Order Contracting would damage the small business community, and the Office of the Small and Disadvantaged Business Unit (SADBU) sided with the contracting community.

After many briefings, discussions and memorandums, these issues found their way over to Capitol Hill, where Mellon and Lovo began to receive negative feedback from The House of Representatives Small Business Committee. The two met with a number of Congressional staffers for the various committees to brief them on the concept, the advantages, how it was a program of inclusion not exclusion, and that the contractor would use multiple trade contractors in executing job orders. The lack of knowledge on the part of the contractor of future jobs would prevent the contractor from maintaining the proper staff to complete the work, thereby making subcontracting crucial to the process.

Mellon was required to attend a hearing of the House Small Business Committee. The Committee told Mellon he was, "disrupting the social fabric of the nation by trying to implement a Job Order Contracting process." Some on the committee attempted to stop the development of Job Order Contracting by insisting on adherence to laws that no longer existed instead of the Federal Acquisition Regulation in existence at the time. The Committee requested the General Accounting Office (GAO) to review JOC and provide information on whether or not it was consistent with Federal laws. The GAO concluded that Job Order Contracting met all regulations.

The key to the implementation of Job Order Contracting during the initial development period is the fact that each of the District Engineers, organized under the Chief of Engineers, held a warrant as a contracting officer. The Directors of Engineering and Housing at the test installations were made ordering officers of the contract. This allowed the group to bypass the contracting community, an impediment at the time. This scheme did not go over well with the Assistant Secretary of the Army, John Shannon. Shannon was infuriated that the group was able to bypass the Army contracting authority and use the Corps of Engineers' contracting authority. To illustrate how upset Shannon became: In one heated meeting, Shannon made several personal attacks against Mellon, demanding to know what his source of commission was, how he got into the Army, and why he was even in the meeting.

This was the point at which Mellon was reminded of Tom Peters book In Search of Excellence where Peters theorizes that the innovator is typically destroyed by the organization. Mellon was making more enemies than friends with the "Mellon Plan" but was committed to bring about change for the better.

1985: The Test Sites Chosen

The test installations had to have a corresponding engineering district to provide the contracting authority. The proposal went forward to Sisinyak that a base from each of the Army's major commands be test sites. The Chief of Staff of the major command would have to give their permission to test Job Order Contracting at a base or nominate a base for testing.

Sisinyak and Mellon traveled around the country visiting the various Chiefs of Staff. The first stop was the Chief of Staff of the Army Material Command (AMC) to recommend Watervliet Arsenal in New York. The AMC Commander agreed to test at Watervliet but insisted that Aberdeen Proving Ground also be included in the test. Both were included. The Training and Doctrine Command approved the recommendation of Fort Sill but only if Fort Monroe would be included. Forces Command had the same reaction when they approved Fort Bragg on the condition that Fort Ord be included. Finally, West Point itself was added to the test sites.

1985: The Documents

The next task would prove to be the most challenging: the price book. Mellon and Lovo looked at off-the-shelf estimating guides and determined very quickly that they would not work for a number of reasons. The biggest obstacle of using an estimating guide was the lack of detail. Other obstacles included: prices that were not local to the work; lack of demolition items; no quantity discounts; and no technical specifications defining the quality of material and workmanship of the tasks.

Mellon and Lovo looked at the work being done by the Huntsville District of the Army Corps of Engineers on construction pricing for the Middle East. With that idea in mind, Mellon and Lovo went to the Middle East District in Winchester, Virginia to work with a team to develop a price book for each of the test sites. They spent countless hours researching construction items and whether they should be included in the price book. The team of engineers and estimators completed the book and looked to the Huntsville District to price the items. The Army Corps of Engineers Guide Specifications defined the quality of material and workmanship for the items being priced.

Mellon and Lovo made the decision that Job Order Contracts were to be procured using a Best Value solicitation. Since the purchase of construction services with an IDIQ was a new concept to government contracting it was felt that awarding contracts based on qualifications, experience and price was the best approach.

Software was the next challenge. The size of the database required the use of software to manage the process. Instead of developing the software with Army resources, a solicitation was crafted to hire a firm that could accomplish this goal.

Mellon and Lovo realized that they did not have the staff level at Corps headquarters necessary to reach the goal of having the first Job Order Contract in place by the end of 1985. On May 21, 1985, Mellon and Lovo had their first Job Order Contracting Executive Conference in Atlanta, Georgia in an effort to gain additional resources to accomplish the goal. Following an introduction of where they were in the process, everyone was divided into subcommittees each having responsibility for completing an aspect of the project. This was before word processors but in a single day drafts for every aspect of this new idea were developed. Refinement of the documents and procedures occurred over the next couple of months with the goal of getting the solicitation for the first contracts on the street around August or September of that year.

About this time the Navy and Air Force showed great interest in the Job Order Contracting Process. Mellon briefed Navy staff at Naval Facilities Engineering Command (NAVFAC) and Air Force Staff at Air Force Headquarters on the process. Both service branches asked to be part of the test program with one installation each.

The Air Force chose Langley Air Force Base of the Tactical Air Command (TAC). The TAC Engineer was Brigadier General Mike Goodwin. Mellon worked directly with Goodwin to produce the documents necessary to solicit the contract. The Air Force wanted to use a name other than Job Order Contracting for their version of the same system. The price book for the solicitation was held up for a couple of weeks while a name was being formulated. Goodwin called Mellon to inform him of the new name: Simplified Acquisition of Base Engineering Requirements (SABER).

In the meantime, the Navy chose Mare Island within Western Division (WESTDIV) as their test site. The commander of WESTDIV at the time was Benjamin F. Montoya, who later became Rear Admiral and Chief of the Navy Civil Engineer Corps and Commander of the Naval Facilities Engineering Command. The Navy decided that they wanted their version of the same system to be called Work Order Contracting (WOC).

Mellon made a trip to San Bruno to brief Montoya's staff on the concept. During the presentation, a member of the audience spoke out saying, "You can't do that. That's illegal!" It turns out that the vocal outburst came from Mellon's father. Mellon had invited the elder Mellon to the presentation to learn about the project being developed by his son. They had dinner together the night before, met in the morning, went to San Bruno's headquarters building together, met the Chief Procurement Officer, Helen Lyle, and then proceeded to the briefing together. Following the outburst, Montoya turned around and look at the elder Mellon upon which Mellon remarked, "Sir, may I introduce you to my father, Commander Hugh Mellon, U.S.N. Supply Corps, retired and obviously a contracting guy."

At this point, almost everything was going through final review prior to the solicitations being advertised. The one task that had yet to be started was the evaluation plan. The Army Secretariat required a formal approved plan for evaluating the test sites. Mellon and Lovo decided to remove themselves from the distractions of Washington, D.C. and relocate to the Corps' training facility in Huntsville, Alabama. The evaluation plan was written over the course of several weeks. It was a difficult task to determine what was to be evaluated, how to evaluate it, and how to measure the results. Mellon would later recall that this was probably the most cerebral task of the entire development process.

1985: The First Job Order Contracts

Requests for Proposals for all of the test sites were advertised by September 1985. The pre-bids occurred in October and November. These were critical because of the unique nature of the contract. Mellon and Lovo wanted to make sure that the contractors understood the concept and could prepare good proposals.

The first Job Order Contract awarded was by the Tulsa District for Fort Sill, OK to Triangle Construction in early December. There was a celebration in Washington among the development team led by Mellon and Lovo, as they had met the deadline to have a Job Order Contract in place by the end of 1985. The second contract was awarded later that December by the Savannah District for Fort Bragg to Tier/Jorgensen. The rest of the test contracts were awarded over the next couple of months and all by the end of February, 1986.

The initial reports from the test bases were excellent. One of the first successes was out of Monterrey. A flash flood took out a bridge on the base. The JOC Contractor, Hensel-Phelps, was called on a Friday night, rebuilt the bridge over the weekend, and it was ready to use on Monday morning. The base did not have to pay emergency rates to get this quick response because the task prices were set in the contract at the time of bid.

Another test at Fort Ord provided information on the validity of the price structure. The project involved a reroof for a number of family quarters, around 60 units, at Fort Ord. The project was split up: 30 for Job Order Contracting and 30 to be bid out. The Job Order Contracting proposal was to be turned in the same day as the bid. The low bid, submitted by a local roofer from the Monterey area, was fifteen percent higher than the Job Order Contracting proposal. This was typical of what the test showed over time and validated the idea that buying construction in volume would lower the price.

The first in progress review was held at Fort Sill, OK in June 1985. It was attended by senior members of the Army staff, senior members of the Corps of Engineers, representative from each of the test bases, representatives from each of the test districts, and all JOC Contractors. Each test base would give a presentation to the group on their experience with Job Order Contracting. The presentations included job numbers, types, and size. It also included successes and failures. These presentations were followed by the districts and then contractors, each talking about the successes and failures. It was obvious to all that there was tremendous support for the system by all involved. However, at one point during the conference, one of the many frustrated contracting officials from the department of the Army stood up and said, "We can't do this. This is just so totally illegal!"

The Army Counsel who was present at the time replied, "No, it's actually legal."

This outburst demonstrated to all present the frustration that the contracting staff were feeling as they watched their world change to a different paradigm.

1987: Job Order Contracting Takes Off

After about two years of testing and a final evaluation, the Army made the decision to make Job Order Contracting available to all. They moved the contracting authority away from the Corps of Engineers and back to local contracting. By now the Army recognized the value of the process. The Federal Acquisition Regulation was amended to define and legitimize the process, and include some restrictions. Job Order Contracting, SABER, and WOC are now institutionalized in the Army, Air Force and Navy.

== Army retirement ==
Mellon retired from the Army in July 1986 and joined one of the largest Architectural, Engineering and Constructions firms in the nation, CRSS (Caudill Rowlett Scott Sirrine). As he managed one of several design offices for CRSS, he saw the process that his team developed in Huntsville, to manage the production of price books for Job Order Contracting, begin to erode. By 1990, the Army lost the ability to generate a Job Order Contracting unit price book. Installations began to look to private companies for alternative solutions to their need for a unit price book.

== Medals and decorations ==
Lieutenant Colonel Mellon was awarded several medals and decorations during his distinguished career in the Army. Of special note is The Legion of Merit he received for his work "... creating, developing, testing, and fielding a completely new concept for procurement of contractor support for facilities engineering activities", Job Order Contracting.

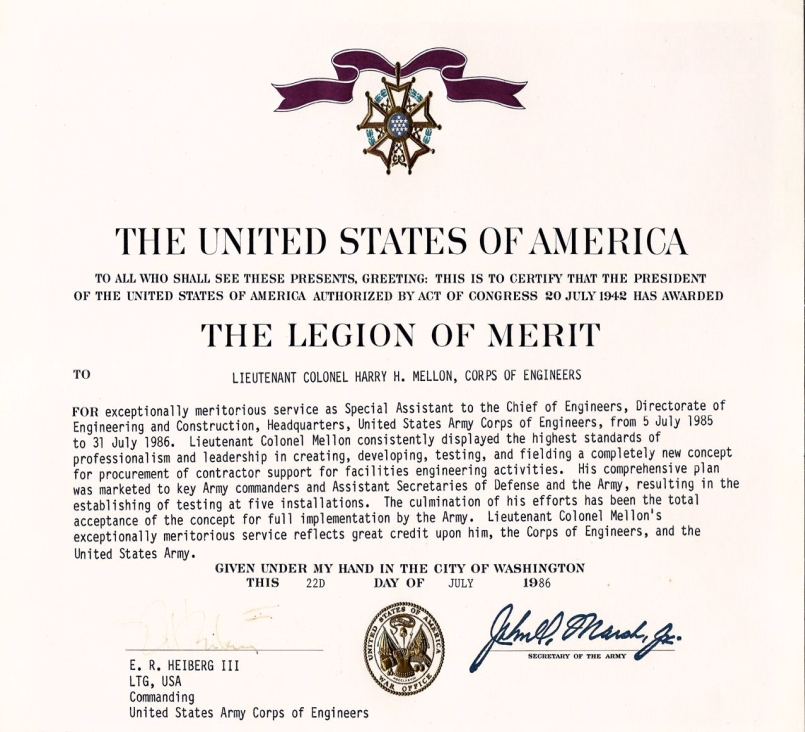
Harry H. Mellon's Legion of Merit for Job Order Contracting

=== Individual awards ===

Legion of Merit Medal
| Bronze Star Medal | Defense Meritorious Service Medal | Meritorious Service Medal |
| Army Commendation Medal w/ 2 Oak leaf clusters | Air Force Commendation Medal | Army Achievement Medal |
| National Defense Service Medal | Vietnam Service Medal w/ 4 Campaign stars | Armed Forces Reserve Medal |
| Army Service Ribbon | Army Overseas Service Ribbon | Vietnam Campaign Medal |

=== Unit awards ===

| Army Meritorious Unit Citation w/ Oak leaf cluster | Vietnam Gallantry Cross Unit Citation | Vietnam Civil Action 1C Palm Unit Citation |

== Founding of the Gordian Group ==
The seeds for the founding of The Gordian Group were planted by Colonel Joe Stewart, USA (ret). Following his retirement from the Corps of Engineers, Stewart was hired by retired Engineer General Charles Williams who was the first president of the newly formed New York City School Construction Authority (SCA). Facing a massive backlog of repairs and alterations, Stewart believed that the JOC process would be an ideal procurement process for accomplishing the backlog. In November 1989, Stewart contacted Mellon and asked if he could assist the SCA in developing a Job Order Contracting program.

Utilizing the vast resources of CRSS, Mellon mobilized a team of professionals in New York City in January 1990 to begin the fast track development of the SCA JOC program. Coordinating the effort was Robert Coffey from the CRSS office in Greenville, SC. However, in March 1990, General Williams fell victim to the political realities of New York City and resigned as the SCA's president. The SCA's interest in the JOC process died with General Williams' resignation. It was during this three-month effort in New York City that Mellon and Coffey developed the idea of forming a company to help public agencies develop and implement Job Order Contracting programs. As more and more public works employees left the Federal government and migrated to state and local public agencies they carried their interest in the JOC process with them. It appeared that the time was ripe to start a company focused only on developing and implementing JOC for local public agencies. In June 1990, Mellon and Coffey founded The Gordian Group, Inc. to do just that.

Gordian annually recognizes innovative uses of Job Order Contracting through the Harry H. Mellon Award of Excellence in Job Order Contracting.
