= Joint Contracts Tribunal =

United Kingdom construction organisation

The Joint Contracts Tribunal, also known as the JCT, produces standard forms of contract for construction, guidance notes and other standard documentation for use in the construction industry in the United Kingdom. From its establishment in 1931, JCT has expanded the number of contributing organisations. Following recommendations in the 1994 Latham Report, the current operational structure comprises seven members who approve and authorise publications. In 1998 the JCT became a limited company.

== Members ==
The members were listed by the JCT in 2014 as:

1. the British Property Federation,
2. the Contractors Legal Group, comprising:
  - the National Federation of Builders,
  - the UK Contractors Group,
  - the National Access and Scaffolding Confederation and
  - the Scottish Building Federation;
3. the Local Government Association,
4. the National Specialist Contractors Council,
5. the Royal Institute of British Architects,
6. the Royal Institution of Chartered Surveyors and
7. the Scottish Building Contract Committee.

== History ==
The Joint Contracts Tribunal was established in the 1930s by the Royal Institute of British Architects (RIBA) and the National Federation of Building Trades Employers (NFBTE), to consider future proposals for amending the Form of Contract which had been published in 1931. Its first chairman, to 1956, was Sydney Tatchell, followed by Sir Percy Thomas. The RIBA Guide to its Archive and History (1986) recorded that the tribunal had been established jointly in October 1932 by the councils of the RIBA and NFBTE to consider suggestions for the amendment of the 1931 Form of Contract, and that each of those two bodies appointed one of the two Joint Secretaries. The Secretary RIBA had acted as the RIBA Joint Secretary until the early 1960s (Macalister to 1942, Spragg to 1959), when this appointment was performed by the Practice Secretary and then by the Legal Adviser. The archived documents are listed in the Guide as the RIBA Joint Secretary's Papers, 1932-1944, 1952-1971, including copies of minutes and reports and papers concerning revision of the Form of Contract 1955-1961.

Important new editions of the form were published in 1939, 1963 and 1980, and after the JCT had become a limited company further revised editions were published in 1998, 2005 and 2011. JCT Contracts are currently published by Sweet and Maxwell Thomson Reuters.

In 2012 the publication was announced of JCT Contracts discovery: the education and learning module from the Joint Contracts Tribunal. This was described as an education and learning module for education and training providers, in-house training teams and independent tutors, providing materials for a comprehensive understanding of JCT contracts and JCT contractual procedures and looking at the roles of contractors, employers, sub-contractors and contract administrators and how JCT provisions deal with matters such as payment, control of the works and control of time.

== Suite of Standard Forms ==
Suite of Standard Forms means a group of all the mutually consistent documents necessary to operate a particular method of procurement and produced to enable them to be used together, including the following where applicable:

- Consultant agreements
- A main contract between the employer and the main contractor;
- Sub-contracts between the main contractor and its subcontractors (both for sub-contractors selected by the employer and for other sub-contractors): the DOM/1 sub-contract is suitable for use with the JCT's standard building contract, and the DOM/2 sub-contract is aligned with the design and build contract.
- A standard form of sub-sub-contract between a subcontractor and each sub-contractor's sub-sub-contractors;
- A design agreement between an employer and a specialist designer;
- Forms of tender for issue by an employer to prospective main contractors and for issue by a main contractor to prospective subcontractors and for issue by a subcontractor to prospective sub-sub-contractors;
- A form of contract for the supply of goods;
- Forms of bond (including performance bonds) and collateral warranties.
- The Construction Industry Model Arbitration Rules, adapted from those of the Society of Construction Arbitrators.

The JCT publishes guidance on which contract to select.

== Main forms ==
JCT substantially revises and rewrites the family of forms every decade. The most recent suite is the 2016 version. Previous versions were dated 1998, 2005, 2009 amendments and 2011. These forms are considered to be the most popular construction contracts in use in the UK.

=== Main contracts ===
1. Major Project Form (MP11)
2. Standard forms of Building Contract (SBC11), versions with and without quantities and with approximate quantities
3. Intermediate forms of Building Contract (IC11), for use where a moderate level of detail is required but less than that required for complex building services work or in other specialist cases, also Intermediate Building Contract with contractor's design (ICD), where the contractor takes on a "portion" of the design function.
4. Minor Works Agreement (MW11)
5. Management Contract (MC11)
6. Design and Build Contract (DB11), where the contractor has a greater level of responsibility for the design of a project than the "design portion" transferred to the contractor under the ICD contract above.
7. Construction Management Documentation

In 2007 JCT published the Constructing Excellence Contract (JCT/CE), a contract designed to support collaborative working, as advocated by the Latham Report, and can trace its roots back to the "collaborative contract" published in 2003 by BE, a joint venture between the Reading Construction Forum and the Design and Build Foundation (and now part of Constructing Excellence).

=== Smaller project contracts ===
Traditional JCT contracts were seen as too detailed and difficult to use in smaller domestic projects so JCT launched a consumer friendly range of contracts called the "Building Contract for the Home Owner".

- Building Contract for Home Owner/Occupier (where the client deals directly with the builder) (HOB)
- Building Contract for Home Owner/Occupier (who has appointed a consultant) (HOC)
- Contract for Home Repairs and Maintenance (HO/RMI)

== Key features ==
The JCT contracts avoid up-front payments from payers to payees. Instead, the payee invoices the payer once work has been certified as completed by an independent third party, the contract administrator (often an architect or surveyor). Often interim certificates are issued where itemised components of the work have been completed, or a verifiable percentage is complete. In the 2009 amendments, the payer or payee can issue the certificate if the contractor administrator fails to do so.

The JCT encourages retention of an agreed percentage of the contract sum until practical completion and then a percentage for a period after final completion. This avoids payment in advance for such things as minor defects or snagging which need to addressed at the end of the project or come to light after the project is complete. So the invoice at each point is a percentage of the value of the work certified complete. The payer can deduct an amount; however, under the 2009 amendments, the method for calculating the new amount must be stated.

The JCT encourages up-front agreement of liquidated and ascertained damages (LAD) as an estimate of the payer's weekly losses if the payee fails to reach practical completion by the contractual completion date. If delays are for reasons beyond the contractor's control, the contractor can request an extension of time: if the contract administrator allows this, it in effect extends the period before which the contractor is liable to pay the LAD.

The JCT introduced the concept of determination, whereby the contract can be terminated for suspension of works, failure to proceed regularly and diligently, failure to remove defective works, failure to execute works in accordance with the contract, or bankruptcy of the contractor. If one party has ceased to perform the contract (e.g. the contractor has gone past the contractual completion date and has no plan to complete the contract), determination enables the other party to end their obligations (e.g. to pay the contractor to finish the project). This is in addition to the common law remedy of repudiation.

Reference is made to adjudication as a quick way of resolving disputes which the parties cannot resolve between them. Arbitration or litigation, depending on the preferences of the parties, is also available for the settlement of disputes, but these are never appeals against the decision of an adjudicator; they are the consideration of the dispute or difference as if no decision had been made by an adjudicator. If arbitration is chosen, then the reference is conducted under JCT the amended version of the Construction Industry Model Arbitration Rules published by the Society of Construction Arbitrators.

== Criticisms/alternatives ==
Lawbuild has proposed a number of amendments to the JCT contract to protect the client further, with the top four being: to ensure the contractor posts a 10% bond to cover the costs of finding a replacement contractor if the contractor goes into liquidation, to ensure the contractor obtains building regulations certificates before practical completion, to ensure the contractor must accept design changes, and to ensure the employer can control the identities of the contractor's designers.

One of the most common disputes around building contracts is with regard to the interpretation of failure to proceed regularly and diligently, and whether the contractor is able to make a claim for loss of profits after determination. In contrast in the US, building contracts can normally be terminated for convenience by the client, only paying for the work already done.

The JCT makes no distinction between work completed by subcontractors and work completed by the contractor, so the client can end up paying the contractor for work certified and yet the contractor may not pay the subcontractor, for example through insolvency. It may then be hard to work with that subcontractor to complete the work. In contrast in some US states, monies due to subcontractors must be held in trust by the contractor.

Alternative forms of building contract available include the Institution of Civil Engineers' Conditions, New Engineering Contract, FIDIC, GC/Works/I, Model Form, and IChemE Form.

In Henia Investments Inc v Beck Interiors, a 2015 High Court case, Mr Justice Akenhead noted that the payment provisions in the standard contract were "relatively and seemingly complex", but this came as a consequence of the need to comply with the payment requirements of the Housing Grants, Construction and Regeneration Act 1996 and the Local Democracy, Economic Development and Construction Act 2009, both of which generate "unnecessarily complex provisions".

== Publication of product liability report ==
The Joint Contracts Tribunal in 1989 commissioned a report examining the legal distribution of liability for defective products in the construction industry. Published in 1993 as a book with the title Product liability in the construction industry (Palmer and McKendrick), it included an account of the tribunal's origin and growth and a list of its seven chairman from 1931 to 1993, including Sydney Tatchell (1931-1956) and Sir Percy Thomas (1956-1960).

It listed the constituent bodies of the tribunal at that time as the Royal Institute of British Architects, the Building Employers Confederation (formerly NFBTE, later Construction Confederation), the Royal Institution of Chartered Surveyors, the Association of Consulting Engineers, the British Property Federation, and the Scottish Building Contract Committee, together with two organisations of subcontractors – the Confederation of Associations of Specialist Engineering Contractors and the Federation of Specialists and Sub-Contractors (later superseded by the National Specialist Contractors Council and the Specialist Engineering Contractors) – and three local authority associations - of county councils, of metropolitan authorities and of district councils.

== Annual lecture ==
The JCT Povey Lecture (jct-povey-lecture) is an annual event at which an eminent person is invited to speak on significant matters that are relevant to the construction and property industry. The purpose of the lecture is to encourage ways of continuing to improve the quality and value of construction output.

The Povey Lecture was inaugurated in 2003 to honour Philip John Povey, who had served the JCT for some fifty years. A barrister by profession, from 1951 Povey was a legal adviser to the NFBTE (later the Construction Confederation) and at the same time began to assist the Joint Secretaries of the JCT, later succeeding Howard Close as NFBTE Joint Secretary before being appointed the first Secretary-General of the restructured Joint Contracts Tribunal Limited in 1998, retiring from JCT at the end of 1999. He died suddenly in 2001.

Speakers and their papers have been:

- Professor Alan Penn (2019) - Our digital future: space and place in a digital world
- Richard Threlfall (2018) –
- Ann Bentley (2017) –
- Tony Giddings (2016) –
- The Hon. Sir Vivian Ramsey (2015) –
- Tony Bingham (2014) –
- Peter Hansford (2013) – A Time for Partnership
- Paul Drechsler (2012) – At the Crossroads – a wasted generation or inspired talent. The power to choose.
- Mike Putnam (2011) – The Journey to Deep Green
- Paul Morrell (2010) – Ambition in an Age of Austerity
- Francis Salway (2009) – Leading on Sustainability
- Rt Hon Nick Raynsford MP (2008) – The construction industry and Government
- Bob White (2007) – Innovation in the change agenda
- James Wates (2006) – Joining up the dots: How the construction industry should punch its weight
- Professor Peter Brandon (2005) – Design, Procurement and IT: Rolling back the frontiers of management?
- Professor Roger Flanagan (2004) – Risk – yours, mine and ours – what is happening in the world
- Richard Saxon CBE (2003) – Vision for the Industry (formerly known as construction).
