= Richard Saxon =

English architect (born 1942)

Richard Gilbert Saxon CBE (born 14 April 1942) is an English architect. He was chairman of Building Design Partnership (BDP), chairman of BE (a fore-runner of Constructing Excellence), a vice-president of the Royal Institute of British Architects (2002-2008), Master of the Worshipful Company of Chartered Architects (2005-2006), president of the British Council for Offices (1995-1996) and Chairman of the Joint Contracts Tribunal (JCT 2015-2021). He was awarded CBE in 2001 for services to British architecture and construction.

== Career ==
Saxon trained as an architect at the University of Liverpool and joined BDP in Manchester as a graduate, becoming an associate in 1970 and a partner in 1977. He headed the firm's London office from 1991 to 1999, and served as group chairman (1996-2002). He is now principal at Consultancy for the Built Environment, a client and business adviser.

Projects upon which Saxon worked (and associated awards) include:

- Halifax Building Society headquarters (1975 - British Council for Offices Award 2000)(listed Grade 2, 2013)
- Durham Milburngate Centre (1978 winner of Europa Nostra medal and Civic Trust Award)
- Merseyside Maritime Museum Masterplan (1981 Civic Trust commendation)
- London headquarters of J P Morgan (1986-1991 - winner of New City Architecture award in 1993)
- Paddington Basin redevelopment (1989-1992)(unbuilt)
- All England Lawn Tennis Club masterplan and redevelopment, Wimbledon, London (1992-1995 - Civic Trust commendation in 1998 for No 1 Court)
- Adam Opel AG Headquarters, Rüsselsheim Germany (1993–97) RIBA Award, 1998.

=== Industry change ===
Saxon has been active in various industry organisations, particularly those promoting more collaborative approaches to project delivery. For example, he was a member and - from 1999-2002 - chairman of the Reading Construction Forum, which played a key role during the late 1990s in applying the recommendations of the 1994 Latham and 1998 Egan Reports. He was also involved with the Design Build Foundation (1997-2002) and BE: Collaborating for the Built Environment (2002-2005); the RCF and DBF merged in October 2002 to form BE, and BE merged in 2005 into Constructing Excellence.

In addition, Saxon was chairman of the Good Practice Panel of the Construction Industry Board (1996-1999), a member of the Strategic Forum for Construction (2001-2002), and a member of the executive board of the Construction Industry Council (CIC) (2006-2014). He chaired the Value Task Group of the Construction Research and Innovation Strategy Panel and subsequently wrote the Constructing Excellence report Be Valuable (2005). After being the inaugural Povey Lecturer for the Joint Contracts Tribunal in 2003, he was elected Chairman of JCT from 2015 to 2021.

He was a regular contributor to the Interdisciplinary Design for the Built Environment masters programme at Cambridge University and contributed a chapter on Changing Construction Culture to a book based around papers given on the course edited by Sebastian Macmillan and others.

In August 2012, he was appointed as a BIM 'Ambassador for Growth' to join the CIC and the UK government's Building Information Modelling Steering Group to look at how the UK can achieve economic growth by exploiting its BIM success. This continued his involvement with BIM; he was a member of the BIS Low Carbon Construction Innovation and Growth Team which produced the key 2010 report recommending government adoption of BIM - an initiative carried forward by the government's Chief construction adviser Paul Morrell. Saxon produced a report for government on Growth through BIM, published by the CIC in 2013, followed by a guidebook 'BIM for Construction Clients', published by NBS in 2016 and a further, concise guide 'Going Digital' for the UK BIM Alliance in 2018.

In addition to Be Valuable, Saxon has also written about architectural subjects including atrium buildings, client advice, and the design of the City of London (Saxon was appointed a Freeman and Liveryman of the City of London in 1988). He is also the author of numerous magazine articles, gathered on his website saxoncbe.com
