= Strategic Forum for Construction =

British construction industry organisation

The Strategic Forum for Construction is a United Kingdom construction industry organisation established in 2001 as the principal point of liaison between UK government and the major construction membership organisations. It also enables different representatives of the UK industry to discuss strategic issues facing construction and to develop joint strategies for industry improvement.

== History ==
The Strategic Forum was established by ministers in 2001 as a successor to the Construction Industry Board (established following a recommendation in the 1994 Latham Report) and the Construction Task Force, established by the then Deputy Prime Minister John Prescott in 1997. Parts of the construction industry had withdrawn support for the Construction Industry Board, so construction minister Nick Raynsford MP established it initially as a Government-funded body. The Task Force had produced the 1998 Egan Report, and Sir John Egan was appointed the Forum's first chairman.

In 2002, the Construction Industry Council, with backing from other umbrella bodies and Raynsford's successor as construction minister, Brian Wilson MP, changed the Forum to an independent industry group; Peter Rogers of property developer Stanhope plc succeeded Egan as chairman, serving until 2006. Prior to its 2016 reformation, the Forum was chaired by Lord O'Neill; the Forum is now chaired on a rotating basis by representatives from each of its six members.

The Forum has been repeatedly criticised for not speaking on behalf of the entire industry (a role also claimed by the CBI's construction council). In August 2012, the then chief construction adviser Paul Morrell, speaking in a personal capacity, proposed to radically shake up the Forum's governance structure to present a unified industry voice to lobby the government, with Balfour Beatty chief executive Ian Tyler to chair a new advisory council to the Government Construction Board. The forum's role also came under scrutiny following the government's 2013 formation of a Construction Leadership Council.

== Structure ==
The Strategic Forum initially had six key sector representatives, each looking after the interests of a particular sector:

- industry clients (represented by the Construction Clients' Group, which includes public and private sector organisations, including Defence Estates, the BBC, BAA and Royal Mail, responsible for significant annual investment in construction projects)
- professionals (Construction Industry Council - this presents the views of professional membership organisations, research institutions and specialist construction business associations, collectively comprising over 350,000 professionals and around 25,000 construction consultancy firms)
- contractors (the UK Contractors Group and the Construction Alliance - UKCG accounted for about 30% of total industry output, while the Alliance represents over 13,500 firms, mainly SME contractors)
- specialist contractors (National Specialist Contractors Council and Specialist Engineering Contractors Group - the NSCC presents the views of 32 specialist trade organisations, while the main umbrella organisations in the SECG represent 60,000 companies, mostly SMEs)
- product suppliers and manufacturers (Construction Products Association - the CPA represents 85% by value, of all UK manufacturers and suppliers of construction products, and covers 43 sector trade associations)
- site workers (trade unions, represented by UCATT)

In February 2016, the Forum was relaunched. Changes reflected a 2015 reformation of the Construction Leadership Council, and merger of the National Specialist Contractors Council with the UK Contractors Group to form Build UK. Now excluding site worker representation, the reconstituted Forum's membership comprised:

- Construction Clients' Group
- Construction Industry Council
- Build UK
- Construction Alliance
- Specialist Engineering Contractors Group (superseded in 2021 by Actuate UK)
- Construction Products Association

The Home Builders Federation and CBI also attend meetings.

== Activities ==
In September 2002, the Strategic Forum published Accelerating Change. This set a headline target that 50% of projects should be undertaken by integrated teams and supply chains by 2007 (progress was made, but the target was not achieved). To help achieve the target, in 2003 it published an online Integration toolkit.

The Strategic Forum seeks to promote and to monitor industry progress on six key areas (described in its Construction Commitments):

- Procurement and integration
- Commitment to people
- Client leadership
- Sustainability
- Design quality
- Health and safety

As appropriate the Forum works with other bodies including Constructing Excellence (which also provides administrative support to the Construction Clients' Group) and CITB.
