= Construction Research and Innovation Strategy Panel =

Construction industry study group in the United Kingdom

The Construction Research and Innovation Strategy Panel (CRISP) was an initiative established in 1995 to identify and prioritise the research needs of the construction industry of the United Kingdom. It operated through a series of Task Groups, each dealing with a particular research topic, and each of which produced a report published on the CRISP website. Collated recommendations were passed to appropriate funding bodies. In 2005, CRISP was absorbed into the National Platform for the Built Environment.

== History ==
In 1995, CRISP was given responsibility for advising the then Department of the Environment on priorities for research and innovation, and was based at the Building Research Establishment in Garston, Hertfordshire, near Watford.

=== Operation between 1998 and 2003 ===
From 1998 Davis Langdon Consultancy provided management support.

Between 1998 and 2002, 13 Task Groups covering topics such as design, sustainable construction, performance and value produced 233 recommendations.

In 2000, 2001 and 2002, the requirements identified by the groups were used to form action plans for the Department of Trade and Industry, the Engineering and Physical Sciences Research Council, the Economic and Social Research Council, the Highways Agency, and the Environment Agency.

=== New CRISP (nCRISP) from 2002-3 ===
New CRISP was formed in 2002-3. An awayday in March 2003 identified a set of 10 research priorities which were incorporated in the nCRISP Business Plan published in October 2003. nCRISP Task Groups were established as follows:

- Education and Skills - supported by the Construction Industry Training Board
- Heritage - supported by English Heritage
- Knowledge
- Major Projects
- Infrastructure - supported by the Institution of Civil Engineers
- Value - chaired by Richard Saxon and with its Task Group report prepared by Sebastian Macmillan.

nCRISP also commissioned a report by economist David Pearce, The Social and Economic Value of Construction. All the groups presented progress reports to the nCRISP Awayday in October 2004, and they were finalised in early 2005. They were discussed at the offices of Mace on 16 May 2005.

nCRISP was subsequently absorbed into the National Platform for the Built Environment, and ring-fenced government funding for sectors like construction ended, and construction had to compete for funding with sectors such as aerospace and pharmaceuticals.

== Legacy and impact ==
The Design Task Group's report was turned into a book chapter by the group's chair, Giles Oliver. After chairing the Task Group on Value, Richard Saxon went on to publish Be Valuable through the industry body Constructing Excellence, while the Task Group report was used as the source of an academic paper. The Pearce Report The Social and Economic Value of Construction (2003) was used for a special issue of the journal Building Research & Information, edited by Jim Meikle.
