= Partnering =

Partnering may refer to:

- Business partnering
  - Construction partnering, a type of business partnering
- Dance partnering
- Domestic partners
