= Never Waste a Good Crisis =

2009 report written by Andrew Wolstenholme

Never Waste a Good Crisis, also known as the Wolstenholme Report, is a 2009 report written by Andrew Wolstenholme and commissioned by Constructing Excellence. Wolstenholme analysed the British construction industry's performance against the objectives set out in the 1998 Egan Report. His assessment was pessimistic, noting a failure to meet targets in almost all areas bar profitability. Wolstenholme outlined several problems prevalent in the industry and measures that might be taken to resolve them, calling on the industry to use the Great Recession as an opportunity to change its performance.

== Background ==
Sir John Egan quoted in the Wolstenholme Report

We could have had a revolution and what we've achieved is a bit of improvement ... I would give the industry 4 out of 10

Constructing Excellence, a UK construction industry organisation, commissioned Wolstenholme to assess the progress made against the recommendations of the 1998 Egan Report. There was a perception that the industry was continuing to underperform - in 2009 there was only a 50% chance of a project being completed on time or on budget. The Wolstenholme Report was published on 30 November 2009 with a foreword written by Michael Latham (who wrote the Latham Report), Sir John Egan and Nick Raynsford (a former construction minister).

== Findings ==
Wolstenholme stated that some progress had been made against Egan's targets, but that the industry's performance fell considerably short in several categories and that compliance with some of Egan's targets was only accomplished in a superficial manner. Egan targeted a 10% year-on-year reduction in capital cost and construction time; a 20% reduction in accidents and defects; a 10% improvement in productivity, turnover and profits and a 20% improvement in predictability. Some improvement was achieved in safety and productivity but only the profitability target was wholly achieved. The improvement was markedly better in the sub-set of demonstration projects selected as case studies by Constructing Excellence than in the industry as a whole. Wolstenholme stated that it was not possible to determine whether improvements in profitability had derived from measures implemented as a result of the Egan Report or through the effects of the continuous economic growth experienced in the years following the Early 1990s recession.

Wolstenholme found that the greatest benefit from the Egan Report, as perceived by those within the industry, was a greater focus on collaboration and partnering with some reporting benefits in quality control, whole life costing and safety. Wolstenholme concluded that many of the apparent changes in the industry following Egan were merely paying "lip service" to the 1998 report. He was largely favourable to Egan's objectives but said it may have been naïve to expect a direct relationship between the best practice expected by Egan and the actual steps taken by the industry.

== Proposals ==
In addition to his review of the progress made against the objectives of the Egan Report Wolstenholme made several recommendations of his own. He proposed that the construction sector take the opportunity presented by the Great Recession to rebuild itself as a sustainable, low carbon industry. Wolstenholme proposed a shift of focus to consider whole-life cost rather than the relatively small and upfront design and construction costs.

Wolstenholme was generally pessimistic about the future performance of the industry and its capacity for change. He highlighted the lack of "joined-up thinking" with regards to sustainability and the proliferation of industry bodies which fragmented the industry. He stated that the traditional separation of construction managers along professional and disciplinary boundaries led to compartmentalization and a failure to attract ethnic minorities and women.

Wolstenholme decried the trend for clients to focus on short-term economic issues rather than considering the built environment as a long term asset. He noted that clients were tending to move away from collaborative partnering contracts to traditional method to allow them to exploit the increased competition in the market following the recession.

Wolstenholme considered that incentives needed to drive companies to invest in innovation instead of being happy to accept moderate returns. He called for change to be driven by contractors and sub-contractors rather than, as traditionally, by clients. Wolstenholme was also critical of government policy, pointing out that there had been nine different construction ministers and nine housing ministers in the nine years preceding his report and that responsibility for training and skills was fragmented across several government departments. He called for the government to reduce waste in its procurement streams and to provide means of improving the training of construction workers.
