= Construction 2025 =

British government report

Construction 2025 is a British government report issued in July 2013 outlining its industrial strategy for the sector until 2025. Key aims were to reduce programme lengths and costs, reduce greenhouse gas emissions and improve the trade gap. The policy saw the establishment of the Construction Leadership Council to drive change in the industry.

== Background ==
The report was issued by the Department for Business, Innovation and Skills in July 2013 during the 2010-15 Coalition Government. The foreword was written jointly by the Secretary of State Vince Cable, Minister of State Michael Fallon and the then Chief Executive of Network Rail David Higgins. The report promised to "radically transform the industry". It sought to build on the changes implemented as a result of the 1994 Latham Report, the 1998 Egan Report and the 2009 Wolstenholme Report.

== Aims ==
The four principle aims of the policy were:

- Reduce whole-life greenhouse gas emissions in the built environment by 50%
- Reduce construction time (measured from conception to completion) by 50%
- Reduce whole-life costs for built assets by 33%
- Reduce the trade gap on construction products by 50%

The government also sought to change the public perception of the industry and its work environment, with a particular view of attracting more young people into the sector. The industry was marred by a perception that it tends towards cost overruns, late delivery, contractual disputes and slow to adapt to the technological change. The government seeks a more diverse workforce, improved safety controls and a more desirable workplace. Other targets were to improve investment in research and innovation and to confirm the government's commitment to building information modelling (BIM).

== Impacts ==
One of the key measures was the founding of the Construction Leadership Council, comprising some of the most prominent leaders in the field from industry and government to spearhead change in the industry. This body has introduced the Fair Payment Charter, a non-compulsory agreement between major companies to implement standard 30 day payment terms by 2018, in a bid to reduce the occurrence of late payment in the industry. Another measure has been the move towards recognition of the Construction Skills Certification Scheme as the only acceptable proof of health and safety competence on site. This would be alongside a recognition that a National Vocational Qualification level 2 should be the minimum standard for all workers in the industry. In 2016 the British government mandated that all centrally procured projects should reach BIM level 2.

The strategy has been supplemented by the Government Construction Strategy: 2016 - 2020, published in March 2016 by David Cameron's conservative government. The new strategy aims to complement Construction 2025 and implemented a new set of Common minimum standards for construction.
