= Federation of Master Builders =

British trade group

- Abbreviation: FMB
- Formation: 1941
- Legal status: Non-profit organisation
- Purpose: UK building industry
- Location: London, EC1
- Region served: United Kingdom
- Members: 6,500+ building companies
- Key people: Phillip Hall (National President); Brian Berry (Chief Executive Officer)
- Affiliations: Builders' Benevolent Institution, TrustMark
- Website: www.fmb.org.uk

The Federation of Master Builders (FMB) is a United Kingdom trade association that protects the interests of small and medium-sized building firms.

The association is independent and non-profit. It works to lobby for members' interests at national and local levels, working in partnership with other industry companies to provide technical advice and promote professionalism in the construction sector.

The FMB also offers advice and building and construction insurance for both builders and consumers through its insurance arm, FMB Insurance (FMBI).

The FMB is the largest construction trade association in the UK, representing over 6,500 construction SMEs, an estimated 42,000 builders. across England, Northern Ireland, Scotland, and Wales.

== History ==
The Federation of Master Builders was established in July 1941 to support the British building industry during World War II. It was called the Federation of Greater London Master Builders until 1943. The association helped to rebuild Britain’s bomb-damaged infrastructure after the Blitz.

In 1957, the FMB’s exhibition at Olympia in London for the 'Building the New Britain Building Exhibition' was visited by the Queen and the Queen Mother.

In the 1970s, the FMB formed the Building and Allied Trades Joint Industrial Council (BATJIC) in partnership with Transport and General Workers Union, to determine annual changes in builders’ wages and working conditions. The FMB’s work with BATJIC continues today.

In the 1980s, the FMB established the National Register of Warranted Builders (NRWB), which later became FMB Insurance.

In the 1990s, the FMB expanded into Scotland and Northern Ireland, the online Find a Builder service was launched, and The Master Builder of the Year Awards began.

In 2005, the FMB joined TrustMark as a founding scheme provider. TrustMark is a Government-endorsed standards scheme for trades that operate in and around the home.

The FMB has held a longstanding partnership with TradePoint, offering discounts to members.

== Structure ==
The FMB is governed by an elected Board of Directors with a senior management team overseeing day-to-day operations.

As of November 2025, Phillip Hall is the FMB National President. Brian Berry is the Chief Executive.

The organisation operates through regional Area Boards across the United Kingdom, each supported by a Hub Director. Regions include Central, London, Northern Counties, North West, Northern Ireland, Scotland, Southern Counties, South West, Wales, and Yorkshire & Trent.

== See also ==
- National Federation of Builders
- Civil Engineering Contractors Association
- Scottish Building Federation
