= Construction Products Association =

UK trade body

- Abbreviation: CPA
- Formation: 2000; 26 years ago
- Type: Trade association
- Legal status: Non-profit company
- Purpose: To represent the construction products industry in the UK
- Location: The Building Centre, London, United Kingdom
- Region served: United Kingdom
- Members: UK construction products companies
- Chief Executive: Peter Caplehorn RIBA
- Funding: Member fees
- Website: constructionproducts.org.uk

The Construction Products Association (CPA) is a UK construction industry trade association. It represents and champions manufacturers and suppliers of construction products. As well as representing some of the largest construction product manufacturers in the UK, the CPA also acts as the 'umbrella' trade organisation for dozens of sector and product-specific trade associations, which themselves represent thousands of companies, mostly SMEs and family-run businesses.

== History ==
It was formed on 1 January 2000 as the result of a merger of the National Council of Building Materials Producers and the Association of Construction Products and Suppliers, and officially launched on 1 March 2000.

== Function ==
At its launch, the first CPA President Roy Harrison said:

The CPA has been formed to act as the focal point for government consultation and its objectives include informing and empowering its membership, complementing the work of sector trade bodies and exerting influence at regional, national and international levels.

— Roy Harrison (first president),

The CPA says it "acts as a single voice to promote and campaign for the construction product manufacturers and suppliers in support of this major UK industry." It represents suppliers and manufacturers on the Strategic Forum for Construction, and is a member of Construction Products Europe.

The CPA outlines its functions as focused on three areas: Improving the productivity, profitability, and outcomes of the construction products sector and the wider construction industry; driving the adoption of digital technologies and processes to make for a smarter, more efficient construction industry; and advising government and manufacturers on solutions for lowering emissions and increasing resource efficiency.

=== Members and structure ===
The CPA has four membership categories:

- Company members - the CPA's Industry Principals Council, comprising executives from the major company members, meets quarterly to discuss issues relevant to the construction products industry and set policy priorities for the Association on these issues.
- Trade association members - the Trade Association Council has a similar role, also meeting quarterly.
- Affiliate members - which either cannot be members of a Trade Association Member; or are members of a Trade Association Member but wish to have a more prominent, direct membership with the CPA.
- Associate members - companies and organisations that do not manufacture or supply construction products but wish to take advantage of the services and support provided by the Association.

The work of the CPA is also supported by various committees covering: technical, economic research, sustainability, and external affairs.

=== Publications ===
The CPA publishes numerous economic publications each year covering the construction and product manufacturing industries, with its construction industry output forecasts widely quoted in both industry publications - e.g. Building, Construction News - and mainstream media.

Following the 2017 Grenfell Tower fire and subsequent revelations of malpractice by certain construction product manufacturers and their employees, plus flaws in product testing, the CPA developed a Code for Construction Product Information, published in 2021. However, the CPA was criticised by Secretary of State for Levelling Up, Housing and Communities Michael Gove after its cladding and insulation manufacturer members failed to commit to paying for post-Grenfell safety measures on buildings; Gove accused the CPA of "coming up with excuses to do nothing slowly". CPA chief executive Peter Caplehorn said the government needed to look at a "complex" and "broader picture" and extend liabilities to include contractors and architects. The CPA was not being obstructive, he said; it had undertaken a “significant amount of proactive comment, proactive action", but CPA members had been unable to reach a consensus because of insufficient data on the amount of work required on buildings.

== Location ==
The CPA head office is situated in The Building Centre, on Store Street in Bloomsbury, central London.

== See also ==
- Mineral Products Association
- Construction Industry Council
