= Construction Alliance =

The Construction Alliance is a United Kingdom construction organisation representing over 13,500 individual companies, mainly local and regional building firms, involved in the UK construction industry.

The Alliance was founded by the Civil Engineering Contractors Association, the Federation of Master Builders, the National Federation of Builders and the Scottish Building Federation, and represents the interests of small and medium-sized building companies on the UK government's Strategic Forum for Construction.
