= University of the Built Environment =

Online college of real estate related subjects

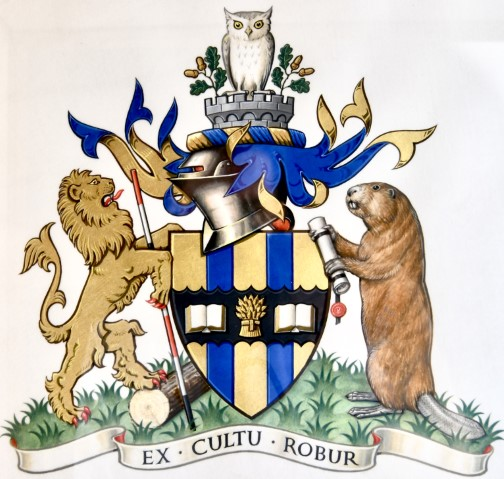
- Coat of arms
- Other name: University College of Estate Management
- Former name: College of Estate Management
- Motto: Latin: Ex cultu robur
- Motto in English: Strength through knowledge
- Type: Independent
- Established: c. 1919; 107 years ago
- Affiliations: CABE; CIOB; RICS
- Chairman: Peter McCrea OBE
- Vice-Chancellor: Ashley Wheaton
- Faculty: 46 FTE
- Students: c. 4,000 (2019)
- Location: Reading, Berkshire, England
- Campus: Urban
- Website: ube.ac.uk
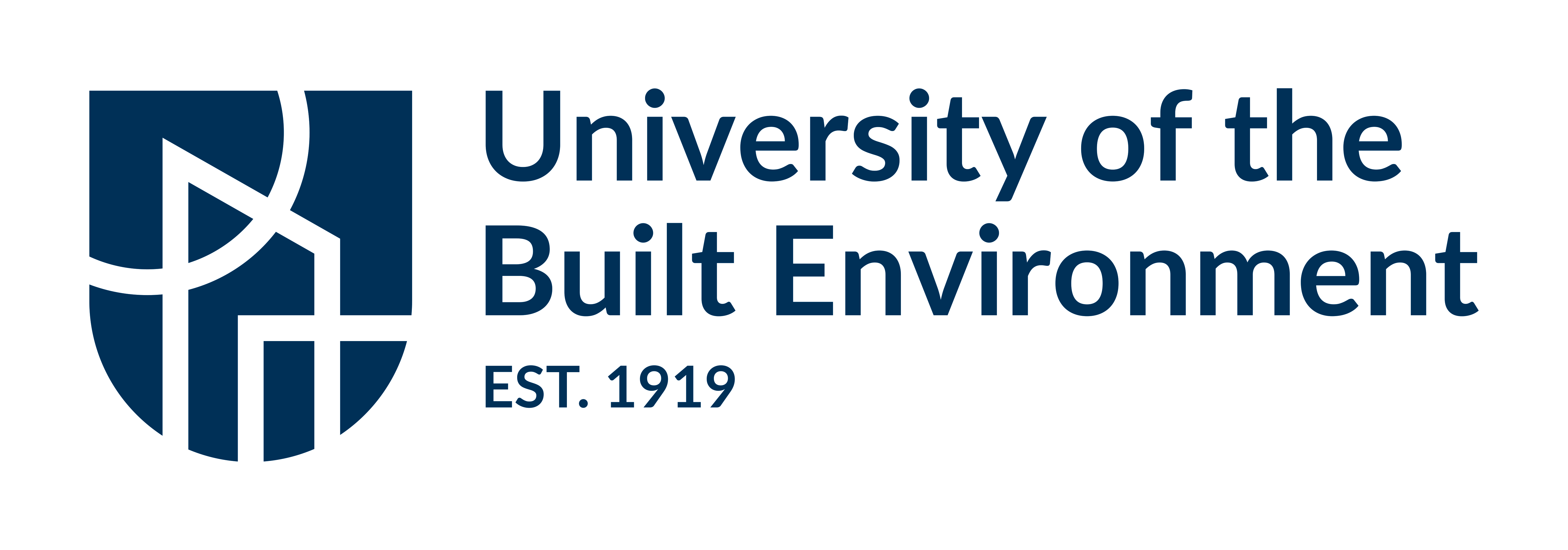

The University College of Estate Management, which trades as the University of the Built Environment, formerly the College of Estate Management, is an independent UK-based higher education institution which provides courses by distance learning in real estate, construction, planning and architecture to students worldwide. As of 2013, the university had educated over 150,000 students.

Since June 2025, the university has been trading as the University of the Built Environment, following approval from the Office for Students (OfS), and will adopt the new name once it is recognised by the Privy Council.

== History ==
The College of Estate Management was founded in 1919 by the "Auctioneers' and Estate Agent's Institute" (which later merged with the Royal Institution of Chartered Surveyors, RICS). The scale of British lives lost in the First World War had led to a shortage of trained staff to manage the country's estates. The college was formed, at the prompting of Sir William Wells, a leading surveyor and estate agent of the era, to serve the estate and property management sector. From 1921 until the Second World War it was based at 35 Lincoln's Inn Fields in Holborn, London. This building was badly damaged by bombs in 1940 and 1941, and was sold to the Royal College of Surgeons in 1943. After the Second World War, the college moved to St Alban's Grove, Kensington, London.

The college was associated with the University of Reading from 1967 and relocated from London to the University of Reading's Whiteknights Campus in 1972. It remained there until September 2016, when it moved to 60 Queens Road, Reading, Berkshire. Charles III became patron of the college in 1998, taking over from Elizabeth II who had been patron since 1977, and visited the institution in March 2019 to celebrate the college's centenary.

The college was granted taught degree awarding powers in its own right by the Privy Council in January 2013. In 2015, it was awarded university college status by the Privy Council and changed its name to the University College of Estate Management. In June 2025, UCEM merged with the London School of Architecture and changed its trading name to University of the Built Environment after receiving approval from the Office for Students.

== Courses and qualifications offered ==
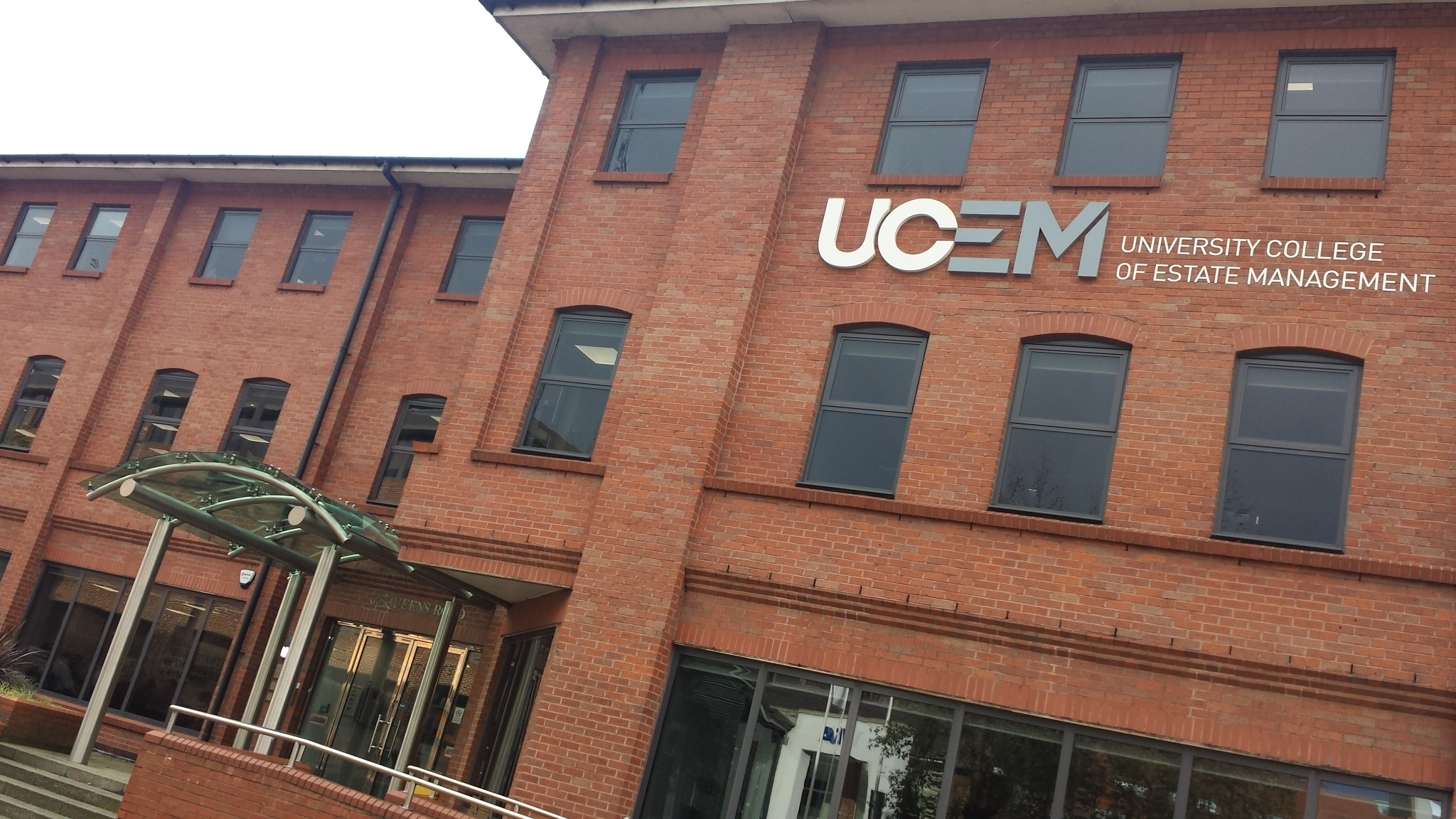
University College of Estate Management, 60 Queens Road, Reading, Berkshire

A large variety of courses are offered, including programmes accredited by professional bodies such as the Royal Institution of Chartered Surveyors and the Chartered Institute of Building. The University's degree courses include real estate, building surveying, construction management, quantity surveying, building control, urban planning, architectural design technology and sustainability. At any one time University of the Built Environment has between 3500 and 4000 students participating from over 100 different countries.

== Alumni ==
Notable alumni include:

- Albert Costain – Conservative MP Folkestone & Hythe 1959–1983
- Irene Barclay – first woman in Britain to qualify as a chartered surveyor, following the passage of the Sex Disqualification Removal Act 1919.
- Alison Nimmo – chief executive of the Crown Estate 2012 - 2019;
- Angus MacDonald – Scottish SNP MSP (2011-2021)
- Baron Mais – former Lord Mayor of London 1972–1973
- Desmond Plummer – former English Conservative politician and the longest serving Leader of the Greater London Council 1967 - 1973
- Gerald Bowden – Conservative MP Dulwich 1983–1992
- Sir John Henry Ritblat – honorary president and formerly chairman and CEO of The British Land Company PLC
- Paul Morrell – Government Chief Construction Adviser Nov 2009-Nov 2012
- William Hurst Rees – original editor of "Valuation: Principles into Practice" [1st Edition 1978] (a leading handbook for students on UK valuation)
- Robbie Moore – Conservative MP for Keighley since 2019.

== Research ==
The University of the Built Environment conducts independent, applied research within the industries it serves, which is available as a resource to students and alumni.
