= Gilbert Millspaugh House =

Historic house in New York, United States

- U.S. National Register of Historic Places
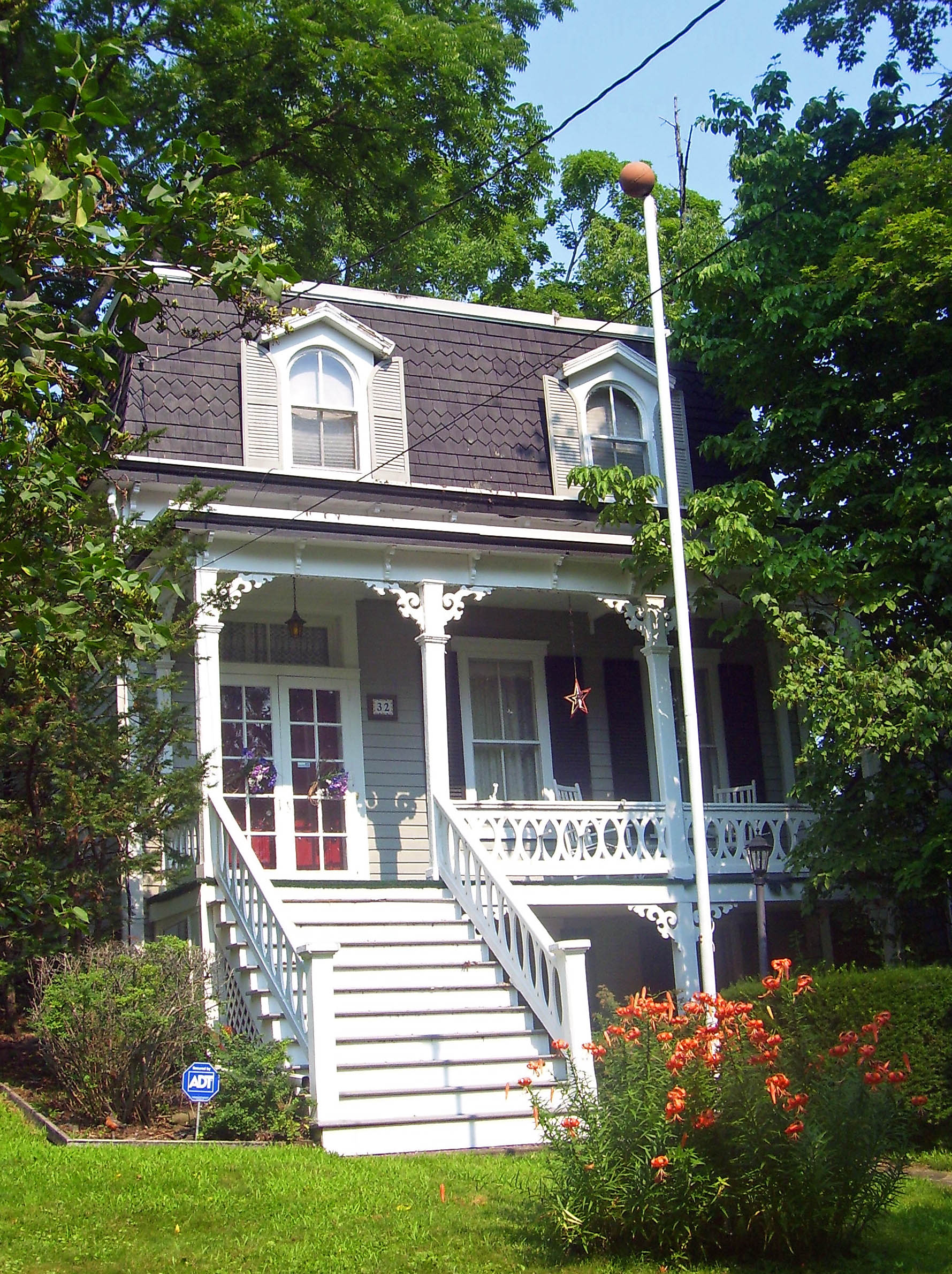
- East elevation, 2007

- Location within New York Location within the United States
- Interactive map showing the location for Gilbert Millspaugh House
- Location: 32 Church St., Walden, NY
- Nearest city: Newburgh
- Coordinates: 41°33′31″N 74°11′16″W
- Area: 1 acre (0.40 ha) or 8,700 square feet (810 m^{2})
- Built: 1874
- Architectural style: Second Empire
- NRHP reference No.: 05001216
- Added to NRHP: 2005

The Gilbert Millspaugh House is located on Church Street in Walden, New York, United States. It is a 2005 addition to the National Register of Historic Places, built in a Victorian style for a local man named Richard Masten. Later it was home to Gilbert Millspaugh, son of a local furniture retailer.

It is an unusual use of the Second Empire style for a small-scale cottage-style primary residence. The house retains many of its original features, such as its fireplace, mansard roof and carriage barn in the back. The latter is considered a contributing property to the house's historic character.

== Property ==
It is located just south of downtown Walden on Church Street, which slopes up sharply between Orange Avenue (NY 208) and Scofield Street. Like all the other lots on Church, it is located on the west side of the street as the east is a wooded slope to Orange too steep to be buildable. The lot itself, 60 by 145 feet (18 by 44 m) with a variety of trees and shrubs, slopes up from the street and its flagstone sidewalk. The other houses in the neighborhood are also of late 19th century construction.

An asphalt driveway goes to the north of the building to the outbuildings in the rear. From it a stone walkway runs diagonally to the entrance.

The house itself is two stories high, sided in clapboard three bays by three, with an exposed basement of mortared rubblestone faced in brick and mansard roof shingled in square and diamond-shaped wood. Steep stairs rise on the east (front) facade to the flat-roofed porch, detailed with chamfered posts and scroll-sawn brackets and railing to create a Picturesque effect. Above the roof is a bracketed frieze giving way to the fasciae below the bracketed cornice.

The roof's steep, nearly vertical pitch is pierced by two gabled round-topped dormer windows with louvered shutters. The top of the pitch is marked by a wood crown molding with built-in gutters.

On the north, the fenestration is duplicated with a three-sided projecting bay window. The south is similar has only one dormer in the mansard. A gable-roofed wing with a small addition, both sided in clapboard. It has a bracketed cornice, fasciae and kicked eaves at the rear.

The deeply recessed entrance features paneled double doors below a rectangular transom. It opens on a side entrance hall. The house's original floor plan remains, although the functions of the rooms have changed. Original finishes include the pine flooring, wall plaster, marbleized door knobs, a marble mantel, molded wooden window trim and the turned newel post and balusters on the staircase.

== History ==
The house was originally built for Richard Masten in 1874. There are almost no surviving records on Masten besides the loan agreement. A local contractor began the house late that year and finished it in 1875. The design likely came from a pattern book, with the

Millspaugh, son of the furniture dealer's founder, moved in 20 years later, in 1895. He stayed there for ten years. The house would remain associated with him afterwards. At some point, the rear wing was built to replace the original rear porch, which had become too rotten to stand. There have been no other significant changes to the house.

== See also ==
- National Register of Historic Places listings in Orange County, New York
