= Steven Groák =

British editor

Steven Groák (1944–1998) was head of research and development at Ove Arup Partnership in London, UK from 1990–1998.

Beginning in 1976 he joint-edited Habitat International, a journal devoted to planning and building in developing countries, with Otto Königsberger. Groák was also the author of The Idea of Building, a book published in 1992 by E&FN Spon, commissioned by the Building Centre Trust to mark the 60th anniversary of The Building Centre. He died suddenly in 1998.

== See also ==
- Otto Königsberger
