= Andrew Wolstenholme =

English civil engineer

Andrew William Wolstenholme OBE FREng (born 5 March 1959) is an English civil engineer, and group technical director of Laing O'Rourke.

From 2011 to 2018, he was the chief executive of the now-completed railway project, Crossrail.

== Early life ==
Andrew Wolstenholme was born in London, the son of an architect mother. He went to Sussex House School and then Malvern College. He graduated from the University of Southampton in 1981 with a first class degree in civil engineering.

== Career ==
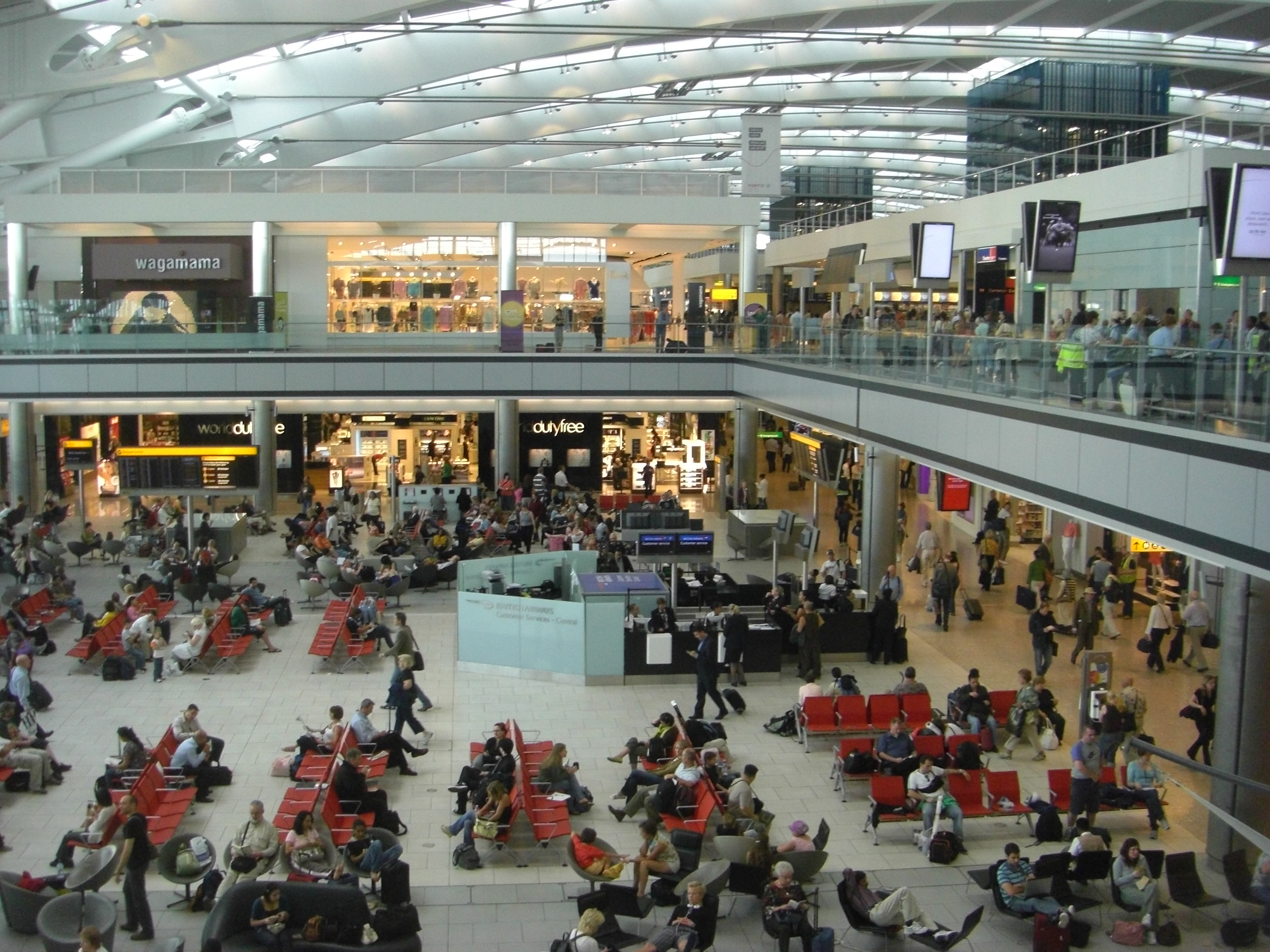
Heathrow Terminal 5 in June 2008

=== Army ===
After university, Wolstenholme served with the British Army for three years as a commissioned officer with the Queen's Royal Irish Hussars.

=== Arup ===
Wolstenholme joined Arup Group in 1987 as a bridge designer.

=== BAA ===
Wolstenholme joined BAA in 1997 as construction director of the Heathrow Express Rail Link. He became programme director of the £4.3bn Heathrow Terminal 5 (T5) in 2002. Construction of T5, designed and engineered by Arup, began in July 2002.

While at BAA, Wolstenholme chaired a Constructing Excellence group which produced a report, Never Waste a Good Crisis, published in November 2009.

=== Crossrail ===
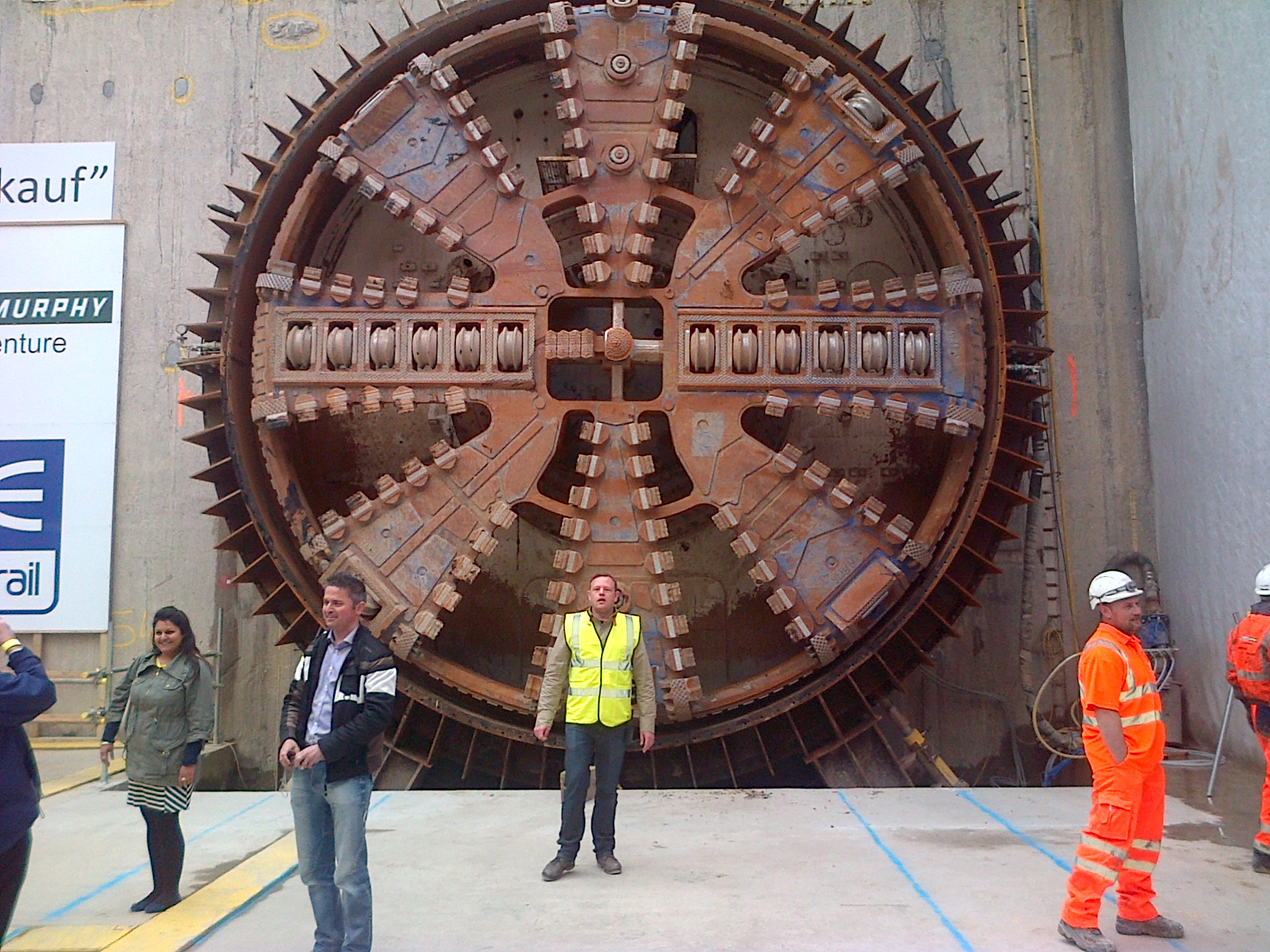
Crossrail tunnelling equipment in May 2015

Wolstenholme became chief executive of Crossrail, Europe's largest civil engineering project, in August 2011, succeeding Rob Holden. He stepped down from this role in March 2018, to be replaced by Crossrail programme director Simon Wright in a combined role.

Whilst working at Crossrail, Wolstenholme also served as industry co-chair of the Construction Leadership Council.

Wolstenholme received a salary of £476,772 while working in this capacity, a performance related pay award of £160,000 and severance pay of £97,734.

=== BAE Systems ===
In May 2018, Wolstenholme joined BAE Systems as group managing director, maritime and land UK. In May 2019 it was announced that Wolstensholme would be stepping down from BAE Systems for personal reasons.

=== Laing O'Rourke ===
In April 2021, Wolstenholme was appointed as group technical director of contractor Laing O'Rourke, having previously been an advisor to the company.

== Honours ==
Wolstenholme was appointed an OBE in the 2009 Birthday Honours and was elected a Fellow of the Royal Academy of Engineering in 2013.

He became a Vice President of the Institution of Civil Engineers in November 2016, with a view to becoming the 155th President in 2019, but stood down in April 2018 citing new work commitments.

Business positions
Unknown	Project Director; Heathrow Terminal 5; 2002–2008	Succeeded by Project completed
Preceded by Rob Holden	Chief Executive; Crossrail; August 2011–March 2018	Succeeded by Simon Wright as Chief Executive & Programme Director
