= Constructionline =

UK register for pre-qualified contractors and consultants in construction

Fortius Ltd
- Trade name: Constructionline
- Company type: Private limited company
- Industry: Professional services
- Founded: 1998
- Headquarters: Basingstoke, England
- Owner: GTCR
- Website: www.constructionline.co.uk

Constructionline is a register for pre-qualified contractors and consultants used in the construction industry of the United Kingdom. Originally established by the UK government in 1998, it was later (2015) acquired and operated by Capita before being bought by Warburg Pincus in June 2018. Combined with other businesses, it was sold to another private equity firm, GTCR, in July 2023. The Constructionline database has details of over 45,000 suppliers, and is accessible to around 10,000 buyers from 3,800 organisations.

== History ==
The 1994 Latham Report recommended the establishment of a national database of pre-qualification information which all public sector procurers could use.

Constructionline was established in 1998 by the UK government to provide a single point of reference for all pre-qualification data for the construction industry. It was originally operated under a concession agreement by Capita. In July 2014 the Department for Business, Innovation and Skills announced it was looking to sell the database and in January 2015 it was subsequently acquired outright by Capita for £35m.

Constructionline provides procurement and supply chain management services, helping buyers source suppliers. As well as its database, Constructionline hosted Meet the Buyer and supplier engagement events across the UK. On 31 January 2018, Capita announced it planned to sell Constructionline as part of a transformation programme including disposal of non-core assets and cost cutting. In June 2018, it was reported that Constructionline had been sold to private equity investor Warburg Pincus for £160m.

In March 2020, Warburg Pincus agreed a deal to take over Builder's Profile, a provider of software used to manage information on subcontractors. This business, Constructionline and rail sector specialist Altius VA were organised into a UK group called Fortius. In late 2021, Fortius joined with France-based Actradis and Once For All, to form the Once For All group, headquartered in Paris. The group was sold to Chicago-based private equity firm GTCR in July 2023.

The Constructionline database contains details for over 45,000 suppliers. It is accessed by around 10,000 buyers from 3,800 organisations.

== Criticisms ==
Constructionline has long faced criticisms from construction bodies.

Research by Salford University in 2003 reported past criticism of the number and type of public sector clients using it and low levels of commitment to the system: a third of 900 clients signed up to the scheme were "sleeping" clients; some businesses signed up to Constructionline "to curry favour with government", while other clients showed "lukewarm commitment... making only patchy use of it". In a survey of members of the Association of Consulting Engineers in 2001, two thirds of firms complained that they were being made to undertake pre-qualification procedures despite being registered with Constructionline. The Salford researchers confirmed many of the original problems persisted, but did find evidence of the benefits to the construction industry of using Constructionline in terms of tangible financial savings.

Many public sector clients continued to use their own bespoke pre-qualification procedures, because Constructionline relied on self-certification and did not command clients' confidence. In 2008, the House of Commons Business and Enterprise Select Committee said Constructionline had "proved unsatisfactory for the industry. The Government should either make it work, or abandon it." Constructionline was also criticised for increasing specialist contractors' costs by insisting on accreditation to the Contractors Health and Safety Assessment Scheme (CHAS) rather than compliance.

Constructionline was also criticised for poor assessment of the financial standing of contractor Carillion prior to the 2017 award of a £133m contract by the Northern Ireland Housing Executive; Carillion went into liquidation in January 2018.
