= British Woodworking Federation =

British trade association

- Abbreviation: BWF
- Formation: 1976; 49 years ago
- Type: Trade association
- Headquarters: The Building Centre, London, England
- Website: bwf.org.uk

The British Woodworking Federation is the trade association for the woodworking and joinery manufacturing industry in the UK. It has just around 600 members drawn from manufacturers, distributors and installers of timber doors (including fire doors), windows, conservatories, staircases, all forms of architectural joinery including interior fit out, as well as suppliers to the industry.

The federation was founded in 1976 through the merger of the British Woodwork Manufacturers Association and the Joinery and Timber Construction Association.
