= NASC =

The acronym NASC can refer to:

- National Access and Scaffolding Confederation, a national trade body for access and scaffolding in the UK
- National Airborne Service Corps, agency in Taiwan dealing with emergency-related transportation
- National Association of Sports Coaches, UK sports coach association
- National Association of State Comptrollers
- National Association of Student Councils, a U.S. student organization
- National Aeronautics and Space Council
- Naval Air Systems Command (NAVAIR), the command of the United States Navy which provides material support for naval aircraft and airborne weapons systems
- Navmar Applied Sciences Corporation, American engineering company
- Necessary and sufficient condition, in logic and mathematics
- New Age Standard Comic, the subtitle of Monthly Dragon Age.
- North American Scrabble Championship, now known as the Scrabble Players Championship
- North American Solar Challenge, a solar car race in the United States and Canada
- North American Spondylitis Consortium, a genetic project funded through the University of Texas Health Science Centre, Houston
- North Augusta, South Carolina
- Nottingham Arabidopsis Stock Centre, the European collection and distribution centre for the model plant Arabidopsis
- Number Administration and Service Center (NASC)

It can also refer to:

- Nasc, an Irish independent, non-governmental migrant rights centre in Ireland, based in Cork
