= CPSL =

CPSL may refer to:

- Cambridge Programme for Sustainability Leadership, an executive education department within the University of Cambridge
- Canadian Soccer League, formerly the Canadian Professional Soccer League (CPSL)
- Canadian Professional Soccer League (1983), a semi-professional soccer league of 1983
- Communist Party of Sri Lanka, a political party in Sri Lanka
