= CISL =

CISL may mean:

- Italian Confederation of Workers' Trade Unions (Italian: Confederazione Italiana Sindacati Lavoratori; CISL), Italian trade union center
- Continental Indoor Soccer League. An Indoor Soccer League 1993–1997
- CISL (AM), a radio station in Richmond, British Columbia.
- The Cambridge Institute for Sustainability Leadership (CISL)
- Computational and Information Systems Laboratory, a division of NCAR
