= Construction Industry Institute =

Non-profit organization

- Founded: 1983
- Type: Research Institute
- Purpose: R&D for Capital Projects
- Location: Austin, Texas, USA
- Region served: Worldwide
- Method: Research, publications, conferences and workshops, implementation, professional development, benchmarking & metrics
- Key people: Mike Pappas, Executive Director
- Website: construction-institute.org

The Construction Industry Institute (CII), based at The University of Texas at Austin, is a non-profit consortium of more than 120 owner, engineering-contractor, and supplier firms from both the public and private arenas. The group aims to enhance the business effectiveness and sustainability of the capital facility life cycle through research, related initiatives and industry alliances. Richard Tucker was CII's founding Director.

== Best practices ==
A best practice is a process or method that, when executed effectively, leads to enhanced project performance. CII Best Practices have been proven through extensive industry use and/or validation. CII Best Practices include the following 17 topics:

- Advanced Work Packaging
- Alignment
- Benchmarking & Metrics
- Change Management
- Constructability
- Disputes Prevention & Resolution
- Front End Planning
- Implementation of CII Research
- Lessons Learned
- Materials Management
- Partnering
- Planning for Modularization
- Planning for Startup
- Project Risk Assessment
- Quality Management
- Team Building
- Zero Accidents Techniques

CII has also researched other practices and information topics, which have been organized into a Knowledge Base. CII's professional development programs help organizations to plan the development of new construction project managers by applying CII Best Practices and other competencies to the managers' professional development.
