= Society of Construction Arbitrators =

Learned society

The Society of Construction Arbitrators is a learned society of arbitrators, adjudicators and mediators in the construction industry, based in London. It has as its object the development and support of commercial methods of alternative dispute resolution. Members of the Society include architects, engineers, surveyors and lawyers from around the world.

== Publications ==
The society has published the Construction Industry Model Arbitration Rules (CIMAR), which since being adopted as the standard by the Joint Contracts Tribunal, have been widely used for dispute resolution in the industry. A less widely used publication is the 100-day Arbitration Rules.
