= Alison Nimmo =

Scottish Chartered Surveyor

Dame Alison Nimmo DBE (born 25 May 1964) is a Scottish Chartered Surveyor who was chief executive of The Crown Estate, (an organisation with a property portfolio estimated at £10 billion) from 2012 to 2019.

== Early life ==
Nimmo was born in Edinburgh but raised in Wales where she attended the Bishop Gore School, Swansea. She is a graduate of Manchester University, and of the College of Estate Management. After graduation, Nimmo visited Australia and worked in Sydney's planning department.

== Career ==
Nimmo's first job in the U.K. was as a planning officer with Westminster City Council from 1986, after which she worked for the surveyors Drivers Jonas followed by KPMG and Manchester City Council (1996) where she was involved in the regeneration of the city after the IRA bombing of 1996. She worked on the redevelopment of Sheffield town centre for Sheffield One (2000) and was design and regeneration director at the Olympic Delivery Authority from 2006 (interim from 2003).

She became chief executive of the Crown Estate on 1 January 2012, taking over from Roger Bright. The Crown Estate has a portfolio of property and related assets estimated at £10 billion.

Nimmo is a non-executive director of housebuilders Berkeley Group Holdings and a visiting professor at Sheffield Hallam University. She is a fellow of the Royal Institution of Chartered Surveyors and an Honorary Fellow of the Royal Institute of British Architects.

== Awards and honours ==
Nimmo was awarded the Royal Town Planning Institute Gold Medal for services to town planning and sustainability. In 2004 she was appointed Commander of the Most Excellent Order of the British Empire (CBE). She was appointed a Dame Commander of the Order of the British Empire in the 2019 New Year Honours for public service and services to the Exchequer.

== Family ==
Nimmo is divorced with no children.
