= Pre-qualification =

Initial filtering of an applicant or a bid

Pre-qualification is a process involving passing or meeting initial criteria or requirements before getting other opportunities opened up to such a person or organisation. In the context of financial loans, for example, a loan officer takes information from a borrower and makes a tentative assessment of how much the lending institution is willing to lend them.

The term is also used in the construction industry; supplier organisations may submit information about their finances, safety records and industry certifications so that they then might be invited to bid for contracts.

== Home loans ==
The United States Small Business Administration has several pre-qualification programs that encourage potential homeowners to pre-quality.

=== Basic process ===
The borrower is typically asked for their social security number or another identifier, together with proof of their employment, income, and assets, which is weighed against the monthly payments being made on their current debts. This provides a general picture of their creditworthiness. Based on this initial information, a maximum loan amount will be determined according to a standard Debt-to-income ratio (DTI). Final approval of the loan will require a credit report from a credit bureau

==== Mortgage ====
In a mortgage context, pre-qualification denotes a process that has not yet been underwritten by the lending institution. Typically, subprime lenders will allow 50% DTI. Common monthly debts used for calculating DTI are mortgage (or new mortgage payment), auto payment(s), minimum credit card payment(s), student loans, and any other common monthly or revolving debt that is on the applicant's credit bureau report. If a refinance is involved, monthly debts that are being consolidated are not taken into consideration, because they are built into the DTI by way of the new loan amount payment.

Other factors included in determining the buyer's pre-qualification status, besides the basic DTI issue, are: monthly gross disposable income, the number of open credit lines the buyer has, and assets. Other factors that are important, because they may affect the rate of interest, which directly affects the DTI by changing the mortgage payment amount are property type, property use, property location, loan-to-value ratio (LTV), what state the loan is in, credit score, the purpose of the loan, whether or not the applicant is a first time home buyer, if the refinance has a "cash-out" amount requested, whether or not the applicant has had a bankruptcy or foreclosure, how many times the applicant has been late on a mortgage payment, the applicant's income type and the way the applicant will verify income (W-2, tax returns, bank statements, etc.).

== Construction prequalification ==
In the construction industry; supplier organisations may submit standardised information about their finances, safety records and industry certifications - either direct to customer organisations or to intermediaries providing prequalification services (for example, in the UK, Constructionline) - so that they then might be invited to bid for contracts. In the UK, industry organisation Build UK maintains the Common Assessment Standard, an industry-agreed standard for pre-qualification.

== See also ==
- Loan
- Pre-approval
- Credit
- Mortgage loan
- Lenders mortgage insurance
- Personal finance
- Redlining
