= National Access and Scaffolding Confederation =

The National Access and Scaffolding Confederation (NASC) is a United Kingdom construction trade association representing companies involved in scaffolding and access work.

Founded in 1945, the NASC represents its sector as a member of Build UK (formerly UK Contractors Group). It is also a member of the Trade Association Forum.

The NASC offers its member companies an additional source of recognition for customer assurance, as well as information and support regarding security, training, and legal issues. It also hosts regular events for industry members.
