= Constructing Excellence =

UK industry membership organisation

Constructing Excellence logo

Constructing Excellence is a United Kingdom construction industry membership organisation created in 2003, the only such which draws its member organisations from across the industry supply chain, ranging from clients, through contractors and consultants, to suppliers and manufacturers of building materials and components. Constructing Excellence attempts to apply the reforms recommended in the 1994 Latham and 1998 Egan Reports, having absorbed several bodies established following those reports. In August 2016, Constructing Excellence became part of BRE, but retains its identity and core purposes.

== History ==
Prior to its BRE merger, Constructing Excellence was itself the result of over a decade of UK construction industry reform initiatives.

Its roots can be traced back to the establishment of the Construction Industry Board (a forerunner of the Strategic Forum for Construction), following the recommendations of the 1994 Latham Report, to oversee industry reform, including the application of partnering by construction project teams. In parallel, industry reform group the Reading Construction Forum was developing guidance on partnering in construction, and the Design Build Foundation (DBF) was launched in 1997, drawing together construction industry customers, designers, contractors, consultants, specialists, and manufacturers representing the whole construction supply chain.

In early 1998 the Construction Best Practice Programme (CBPP, and its sister programme, IT Construction Best Practice, ITCBP) was created to provide guidance, advice and support on implementing change to UK construction and client organisations, instituting regional best practice clubs and producing case studies. Following the October 1998 publication of the Egan Report, Rethinking construction, Movement for Innovation (M4i) and the Confederation of Construction Clients (superseding the Construction Clients' Forum, formed in 1994) were established, along with focused sector groups: the Housing Forum, a Local Government Task Force (LGTF) and a Central Government Task Force (a Government Construction Clients Panel, GCCP, had been established after the 1996 Levene Report, Efficiency Scrutiny into Construction Procurement by Government). In March 1999, the Office of Government Commerce launched an "Achieving Excellence" programme to improve the performance of government departments, as well as their executive agencies and non-departmental public bodies.

This profusion of groups and initiatives proved unwieldy, and during the early years of the 21st century, several mergers took place:

- In October 2002, the DBF and Reading Construction Forum merged to form a new supply chain body, Collaborating for the Built Environment, known as Be.
- In 2003, M4i, the Construction Best Practice Programme, Housing Forum, (Note: The Housing Forum later, in 2008, moved from Constructing Excellence to the National House Building Council.) LGTF and GCCP were combined as Constructing Excellence, which continued the best practice clubs and M4i demonstration project programmes.
- In 2005, Constructing Excellence and Be merged.
- In August 2007 Constructing Excellence took over the Network for Construction Collaboration Technology Providers, but this quickly became defunct.

In August 2016, Constructing Excellence merged with BRE, with BRE set to maintain the Constructing Excellence brands and functions. Constructing Excellence was set to become a wholly owned subsidiary of BRE and retain its managing structure and CEO. The establishment of a Constructing Excellence Foundation, under the BRE Trust, would allow trading profit to be channelled into research and education for its member companies.

== Activities ==
As well as continuing the best practice clubs network and demonstration projects work started by the CBPP and M4i, Constructing Excellence produced several industry reports including:

- Be Valuable, an assessment of life-time cost approaches such as 1:5:200, written by Richard Saxon and published in 2005.
- continued development since 2006 of the Avanti ICT research project including making Avanti part of the update of BS 1192.
- the Wolstenholme Report (Never Waste a Good Crisis), written by Andrew Wolstenholme and published in 2009, which reviewed progress since the 1998 Egan Report and made further recommendations to the industry.
- jointly with the JCT in 2009, Constructing Excellence launched the JCT Constructing Excellence collaborative contract (originally the Be Collaborative Contract developed by a Reading Construction Forum working group and published in September 2003).

It also undertakes UK government consultancy work, including compilation (with BRE) of the industry's annual Key Performance Indicators (KPIs), which are included in the ONS's Construction Statistics Annual. The first KPIs were produced in 1998 by M4i.

Constructing Excellence provides administrative support to the Construction Clients' Group (formerly the Confederation of Construction Clients) and, where appropriate, works in partnership with the pan-industry government liaison body, the Strategic Forum for Construction (successor to the Construction Industry Board).

== Notes and references ==
=== Sources ===
- Ward, Don and Crane, Alan (2003) "The story so far" in Jones, David, Savage, and Westgate, Rona (2003) Partnering and Collaborative Working, Informa Professional, London, pp.1-26.
