= Paul Gilding =

Australian environmentalist

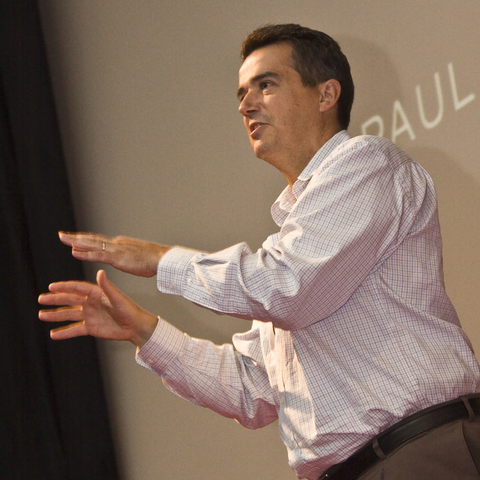
- Gilding giving a TEDx talk, 2009
- Born: 1959 (age 66–67); Adelaide, Australia
- Occupations: Writer, environmentalist, consultant
- Website: PaulGilding.com

Paul Gilding is an Australian environmentalist, consultant, and author, known for The Great Disruption: Why the Climate Crisis Will Bring On the End of Shopping and the Birth of a New World (2011).

== Early life and career ==
Gilding was born in 1959 in Adelaide to Methodist parents who worked in social services. He started his career as an activist in his early teens, focusing on South African apartheid and Indigenous land rights in Australia. While serving in the Australian Air Force, he also became involved in the nuclear disarmament movement. According to an interview on AlterNet, Gilding's experience in anti-nuclear politics led to a greater awareness of environmental issues and led him to join Greenpeace in the 1980s, becoming involved in direct actions against corporate polluters. Between 1989 and 1994, Gilding served as the executive director of Greenpeace Australia and, later, Greenpeace International.

He has served in the Australian military, and was a global CEO of Greenpeace International.

In 2012, Gilding delivered a presentation on the thesis of his book at the 2012 TED conference titled The Earth is Full.

As of 2016 Gilding served on the advisory board of The Climate Mobilization, a grassroots advocacy group calling for a global economic mobilisation against climate change on the scale of the American home front during World War II, with the goal of 100% clean energy and net zero greenhouse gas emissions by 2030.

He is a fellow of the Cambridge Institute for Sustainability Leadership, and has led residential seminars convened by its The Prince of Wales's Business & Sustainability Programme in Melbourne.

== The Great Disruption ==
In The Great Disruption: Why the Climate Crisis Will Bring On the End of Shopping and the Birth of a New World (2011), Gilding posits that the 2008 financial crisis was a symptom of human civilization growing beyond Earth's ability to support it, and is tied to the threat posed by climate change and other forms of environmental degradation. Because of this, Gilding calls for an end to the whole concept of exponential economic growth, which he blames for the consumption and waste that has led to both the economic and ecological crises facing mankind and modern civilisation.

Contrary to many environmental writers (including James Lovelock, Clive Hamilton, Richard Heinberg, and James Howard Kunstler) Gilding argues that people will work together through the climate crisis and that humanity as a whole will eventually act in time to save civilisation, albeit too late to prevent catastrophic consequences. He bases this argument on the ingenuity of past generations in the midst of crisis, particularly World War II. Gilding also believes that the global economy will fully embrace sustainable energy when societies fully accept the reality of climate change and abandon fossil fuel resources.

== See also ==
- Environmental movement in Australia
