= UK Contractors Group =

Trade association for construction contractors in the UK

- Type: Limited Company
- Industry: Construction
- Predecessors: Major Contractors Group; National Contractors Federation
- Founded: January 2009
- Defunct: September 2015
- Successor: Build UK
- Headquarters: London, England
- Key people: James Wates (Chairman), Stephen Ratcliffe (Director)
- Number of employees: 4
- Website: www.ukcg.org.uk

The UK Contractors Group (UKCG) was the primary association for construction contractors operating in the United Kingdom from January 2009 until September 2015.

== History ==
Established in January 2009, it succeeded the Major Contractors Group and the National Contractors Federation which had until that point represented the views of the leading UK contractors. In September 2015, it merged with the National Specialist Contractors Council to form Build UK.

== About ==
The UKCG represented over thirty leading contractors operating in the UK on constructions specific issues. Between them, UKCG members accounted for £33 billion of construction turnover – a third of UK construction total output.

UKCG's mission was to promote the UK construction industry and to support its members in delivering excellence by encouraging contractors to work together with their clients and supply chains to promote change and best practice. From the UKCG website:

"to work on its members' behalf to promote common interests on sector specific contracting issues. It will represent those interests in dialogue with Government and regulatory bodies and facilitate networking and the exchange of information and ideas. It will also endeavour to work closely with the Confederation of British Industry (CBI) to ensure that the construction industry's voice is fully represented in its work on more general business issues...."

It was one of two organisations that represented the views of contractors on the Strategic Forum for Construction, along with the Construction Alliance.

UKCG also worked closely with the Confederation of British Industry (CBI) Construction Council to ensure that contractors' interests were properly reflected in the wider business agenda.

== Activities and campaigns ==
UKCG commissioned the business consultants LEK to produce an independent report on the contribution construction makes to the UK economy. This report, "Construction in the UK economy: The Benefits of Investment", was updated in May 2012, and showed that spending on construction significantly benefitted the UK economy. It also claimed that construction was the best sector to stimulate employment.

UKCG published in 2011 further research showing the contribution construction was making to the English regions, Scotland, Wales and Northern Ireland. The research, undertaken by the economic consultancy Cebr and Glenigan showed the pattern of construction activity to be variable across the UK.

This campaign was followed by "Creating Britain's Future" launched in the Autumn of 2012, aiming to build on the industry's successful delivery of the London Olympics infrastructure by showing that the UK construction industry was: (1) important to the UK economy, (2) a driver of growth, (3) delivering excellent products, and (4) helping change lives.

In November 2012, UKCG and CITB ran the "Open Doors Weekend" – an initiative for contractors to invite the public to visit sites and to see what they entail in terms of technical aspects, employment/career opportunities and community involvement in order to promote and position the industry positively. Other partner organisations were the Specialist Engineering Contractors Group, the Chartered Institute of Building, the Considerate Constructors Scheme and Construction News.

In August 2014, UKCG and CITB launched the "Born To Build" campaign - a careers resource for young people to hear about the opportunities for young people in construction. The same Open Doors Weekend partners were sponsors.

== Key industry standards ==
The UKCG was involved in the establishment of industry standards, including:

- Health and Safety Charter and a supply chain charter
- Health and safety training standard for directors, supervisors and operatives
- Competition Law Code of Conduct
- Anti-Bribery Code of Conduct
- Statement on the procurement of materials

== Membership ==
The UKCG had three categories of membership: Contractor (full), Affiliate and Associate Members.

Its Full members included Balfour Beatty, BAM Construct, Bouygues, Carillion, Clugston Group, Galliford Try, Interserve, Kier Group, Lendlease and Skanska.

The Affiliate members (the Electrical Contractors' Association, the Building Engineering Services Association, the National Access and Scaffolding Confederation and the National Federation of Demolition Contractors) represented specialist contractors.

The Associate members were B&CE, Cogitamus, Deloitte, Glenigan, Madano, Pinsent Masons and Reynolds Porter Chamberlain
