= William Hurst Rees =

William Hurst Rees (12 April 1917 – 6 January 2004) was a leading British valuation surveyor, a Member of the Lands Tribunal from 1973 until his retirement in 1989. He was the originator and editor of the first five editions of Valuation: Principles into Practice (now in its sixth edition of 2008), the leading handbook for students and practitioners of valuation in the UK.

Rees was born in Bushey, Hertfordshire and educated at Watford Grammar School for Boys. He began his professional life with Salter Rex & Co while studying for a professional degree at the College of Estate Management in London. During the Second World War he joined the Royal Artillery and later transferred to the Royal Engineers, with which he served during the Normandy landings. When discharged after the war he had achieved the rank of Major.

After the war he became a lecturer at the College of Estate Management, the leading British institution of higher learning in the fields of property, and from 1948 to 1951 was Head of the Valuation Department. In 1949 he became joint author, with David Lawrence and Harold May, of the second edition of Modern Methods of Valuation and subsequently edited the next four editions. In 1951 he moved to Richard Ellis as head of the valuation department. During this period he acted for Mrs Harvey in the Harvey v Crawley case, which gave rise to the concept of Crawley costs. In 1961 he became senior partner of Turner Rudge & Turner, where he stayed until he became a member of the Lands Tribunal in 1973, where he gave lead decisions in a number of important cases. In 1978 he devised and edited the first five editions of Valuation: Principles into Practice.
