= Pre-approval =

Practice in personal finance

In lending, a pre-approval is the pre-qualification for a loan or mortgage of a certain value range.

For a general loan a lender, via public or proprietary information, feels that a potential borrower is completely credit-worthy enough for a certain credit product, and approaches the potential customer with a guarantee that should they want that product, they would be guaranteed to get it. This rarely happens in the financial services industry, and when it does happen, it is usually loaded with fine print that is not immediately disclosed. Usually, what happens is pre-qualification, instead.

Although, to a typical consumer, "you're pre-approved" means "you already passed the approval process and therefore are guaranteed to be immediately granted the loan if you apply," the literal meaning is different. The literal meaning is "at a stage before approval." Thus, the term "pre-approved" is often used by advertisers to induce consumers to apply for the advertiser's offer.

The legal meaning however is varying depending on circumstances surrounding the overall context of the offer, and federal and state laws applied regarding individual consumer claims, and/or actions brought by consumer advocation agencies.

For a mortgage, people interested in buying a house can often approach a lender, who will check their credit history and verify their income, and then can provide assurances they would be able to get a loan up to a certain amount. This pre-approval can then help a buyer find a home that is within their loan amount range. Buyers can ask for a letter of pre-approval from the lender, and when shopping for a home can have possibly an advantage over others because they can show the seller that they are more likely to be able to buy the house. Often real estate agents prefer to work with a buyer who has a pre-approval as it demonstrates that they are well-qualified to receive financing and are serious about buying a home. A pre-approval is based on the documentation the borrower supplies at the time of application, and any actual eligibility to receive the pre-approved loan depends on the terms and conditions of the pre-approval and the ability to secure the loan before the pre-approval expires.

In case the buyer will put down a downpayment of less than 20%, he will have to pay private mortgage insurance (PMI) each month besides the mortgage payments. The PMI is automatically canceled once the buyer has 20% equity in its home.

== Disingenuous credit card offers ==
Many credit card companies and other money lending companies, will send out letters to people using the terms "You're pre-approved". This is disingenuous by the companies because they fully know that many consumers will see it and believe it means they have already passed the approval process when in fact they have not.

== See also ==
- Credit
- Mortgage loan
- Lenders mortgage insurance
- Loan
- Pre-qualification
