= National Federation of Builders =

UK trade association

- Abbreviation: NFB
- Formation: 1896
- Legal status: Not-profit organisation
- Purpose: English and Welsh building industry
- Location: Spectrum House, Suite AF29, Beehive Ring Road, Gatwick, West Sussex, RH6 0LG
- Region served: England and Wales
- Members: 1,400 building companies
- Chief Executive: Richard Beresford
- Affiliations: House Builders Association NFB Cymru (Wales) NFB Heritage Major Contractors Group
- Website: NFB

The National Federation of Builders (NFB) is a United Kingdom trade association representing the interests of regional contractors and small and medium sized house builders (up to 250 homes per annum) in England and Wales.

With three other trade associations, it is represented on the UK government's Strategic Forum for Construction through the Construction Alliance.

== History ==
It was founded in 1896. In 2024, it announced plans to merge with its Scottish counterpart, the Scottish Building Federation.

== Structure ==
A non-profit organisation, the National Federation of Builders (NFB) is an independent federation which supplies business and training services to builders, constructors, contractors and house builders across England and Wales. Its website provides a public list of NFB-approved builders and a find a builder service.

The NFB includes the House Builders Association (HBA), NFB Heritage, the Major Contractors Group (MCG) and NFB Cymru.

The organisation has three main departments looking after member concerns; training, policy and membership services. Membership is split into eight regions; Southern, South West, Eastern, Midlands, North East, North West, London and Wales.

NFB members are eligible for offers, discounted products and services through Associate members and advice lines.

== Policy ==
The NFB policy team is split into construction and housebuilding, allowing it to campaign on different agendas.

=== Construction ===
After a long campaign, the NFB was instrumental in the implementation of the Prompt Payment Code, which checks when large business pays their suppliers. Working alongside Peter Aldous, the NFB lobbied for retentions to be put into trust, meaning if there are any insolvencies in the supply chain, those who are owed money are insulated from any losses.

=== Housebuilding ===
The British Government's housing white paper, titled, 'Fixing the broken housing market' had a heavy focus on 'diversifying the housing market' and was largely influenced by the HBA, who has been lobbying the Government to understand the negative impact of housing policy on small and medium sized housebuilders (SMEs) over the last twenty years, which saw 80% of SMEs leaving the industry in the last thirty years. The Government has been persuaded to do more to help SMEs, who train four in five construction apprentices and are the predominant rural employers by improving housing site allocations in local plans. The HBA secured policy in the housing white paper update, that meant at least 10% of the sites allocated for residential development in local plans should be on sites of 0.5 hectare or less. This is in addition to the windfall allowance. The HBA had initially asked for this percentage to be 30%, after 20% was proposed; however, this was downgraded after push back from local authorities.

Previous collaborations with Natural England on their district licensing for great crested newts proved that there was an appetite and ability for the construction industry to support conservation while improving the planning process. The HBA therefore became involved on writing guidance and setting metrics for biodiversity net gain, which leaves the environment in a better state than when development began. As the only building trade association who rejected exemptions for small sites, the HBA is certain that the policy can be a springboard to both protect the environment and establish a new conservation and biodiversity industry. Work on ongoing for net gain, which will be mandated sometime in 2019.

=== Public procurement ===
NFB has commented on inappropriate use of credit reports in local government construction procurement, which can discriminate against smaller businesses, and supported the use of PAS 91, a standardised pre-qualification questionnaire for the construction industry.

== See also ==
- Civil Engineering Contractors Association
