= Polly Courtice =

South African-British academician

Dame Veronica Anne Courtice, DBE, LVO, DL (born June 1952, Johannesburg), known as Polly Courtice, is a South African-British academician specialising in sustainability. She has an MA from the University of Cambridge (1973) and is also a graduate of the University of Cape Town (1978). She is a Fellow of Churchill College and an Honorary Fellow of Murray Edwards College, Cambridge.

She was Founder Director of the University of Cambridge Institute for Sustainability Leadership at the University of Cambridge until April 2021. She was the Founder Director of The Prince of Wales's Business & Sustainability Programme, and Academic Director of Cambridge University's Master of Studies in Sustainability Leadership.

She is a Deputy Lieutenant for Cambridgeshire, a member of the Cambridgeshire & Peterborough Independent Commission on Climate, and a Trustee of Cambridge Past, Present and Future. She is a Non-Executive Director of BSI (the British Standards Institute) and a Member of the Supervisory Board of Mercedes Benz Group AG. She is a member of the judging panel for the Queen’s Award for Sustainable Development and a Sustainability Advisor to Terra Firma Capital Management Ltd.

== Honours ==
- Dame Commander of the Order of the British Empire (DBE) in the 2016 Birthday Honours for services to sustainability leadership.
- Lieutenant of the Royal Victorian Order (LVO) in the 2008 Birthday Honours
- Honorary Doctorate, UIS - Arctic University of Norway
- Recipient of the 2015 Stanford Bright Award for Environmental Sustainability
- Lifetime Achievement Award at Ethical Corporation's annual Responsible Business Awards in 2016
- Business Green’s Lifetime Achievement Award in 2018
