= Egan Report =

The Egan Report, titled Rethinking Construction, was an influential report on the UK construction industry produced by an industry task force chaired by Sir John Egan, published in November 1998. Together with the Latham Report, Constructing the Team, produced four years earlier, it did much to drive efficiency improvements in UK construction industry practice during the early years of the 21st century.

== Historical context ==
While the 1994 Latham Report had stimulated various industry initiatives, government action was deemed necessary to get the industry to make the necessary changes. In October 1997, the then Deputy Prime Minister John Prescott commissioned a Construction Task Force, chaired by Sir John Egan, a former chief executive of Jaguar Cars, to look at the construction industry from the clients' perspective. The Task Force was to advise on opportunities to improve the efficiency and quality of the UK construction industry's service and products, to reinforce the impetus for change, and to make the industry more responsive to the needs of its customers.

== Report ==
Informed by experiences in other industries (notably manufacturing), the Task Force report endorsed much of the progressive thinking already under way, and sought to improve performance through eliminating waste or non-value-adding activities from the construction process. It identified five key drivers of change:

- committed leadership
- a focus on the customer
- integrated processes and teams
- a quality driven agenda, and
- commitment to people.

Having put the client's needs at the very heart of the process, it advocated an integrated project process based around four key elements:

- product development
- project implementation
- partnering the supply chain, and
- production of components.

== Legacy ==
Existing industry bodies such as the Construction Industry Board, Construction Best Practice Programme and the Design Build Foundation incorporated the Egan agenda into their activities, and were augmented by a new industry organisation, the Movement for Innovation. These national level organisations were tasked with application of the ideas of Rethinking Construction through ‘demonstration projects’, and regional ‘cluster groups’ or best practice clubs (these initiatives continue today under the auspices of Constructing Excellence).

In March 1999, the UK government's Achieving Excellence in Construction initiative was launched to improve the performance - as industry clients - of central government departments, executive agencies and non-departmental public bodies. The initiative set out a route map with performance targets under four headings: management, measurement, standardisation and integration. Targets included the use of partnering and development of long-term relationships. Against this background, other government departments began to recognise the impact partnering could make and to promote the approach (e.g.: CABE/HM Treasury 2000, National Audit Office 2001).

In July 2001, as successor to both the earlier Task Force and the CIB, the Strategic Forum for Construction was set up by ministers under the chairmanship of Sir John Egan. On 12 September 2002 it published Accelerating Change, a report on its first year of activity. This report also underlined the potential importance of information technology in achieving greater integration, and set the tone for future UK government initiatives, notably the drive from 2010 onwards under chief construction adviser Paul Morrell to implement building information modelling on all UK public sector construction projects.

The Egan Report was one of the influences that fed into the early syllabus of the Interdisciplinary Design for the Built Environment programme at the University of Cambridge.
