= Build UK =

UK organization

- Company type: Limited Company
- Industry: Construction
- Predecessors: National Specialist Contractors Council; UK Contractors Group
- Founded: September 2015
- Headquarters: London, England
- Key people: Suzannah Nichol Chief Executive; Julie White Chair
- Number of employees: 14
- Website: builduk.org

Build UK is a representative organisation in the Construction industry of the United Kingdom. It was formed by the 2015 merger of the UK Contractors Group (UKCG) and the National Specialist Contractors Council (NSCC). Combining clients, main contractors, trade associations, and other organisations, it claims to represent over 40% of UK construction, with organisational priorities focussed on improving performance, increasing construction productivity, and taking a sustainable approach to skill development and retention in the industry.

== History ==
Build UK was launched on 1 September 2015, following the merger of the UKCG and the NSCC. Its members include industry clients, main contractors, trade associations representing over 11,500 specialist contractors, and other organisations committed to industry collaboration. It claims to represent over 40% of UK construction.

Its initial action plan had five key areas: the image of construction, industry's skills needs, effective pre-qualification, health and safety performance, and fair payment practices.

Following Carillion's January 2018 liquidation, Build UK set out an agenda to reform the construction industry's commercial model, potentially eliminating unfair contract terms, late payment and retentions.

In 2022, Build UK was awarded the 'Royal Charter Award for Excellence in Construction' by the Worshipful Company of Constructors for the leadership role it played during the COVID-19 pandemic in the United Kingdom.

== Policies ==
Build UK promotes the adoption of collaborative supply chain practices in the construction industry, and is working towards the elimination of retentions as a business practice by 2025. The Construction Leadership Council has endorsed Build UK's Roadmap to Zero Retentions.

Build UK also maintains the Common Assessment Standard (CAS), an industry-agreed standard for pre-qualification. In 2023, Scape became the first UK construction framework provider to adopt the CAS, helping clients to ensure consistent, high-quality supply chain partners work on their projects, and Scape CEO Mark Robinson joined the Build UK board.

== Membership ==
Build UK has four categories of membership: Alliance, Clients, Contractors and Trade Associations.
