= Constructability =

Ease of construction

Constructability (or buildability) is a concept that denotes ease of construction. It can be central to project management techniques to review construction processes from start to finish during pre-construction phase. Buildability assessment is employed to identify obstacles before a project is actually built to reduce or prevent errors, delays, and cost overruns.

CII defines constructability as “the optimal use of construction knowledge and experience in planning, design, procurement, and field operations to achieve overall project objectives”.

The term "constructability" can also define the ease and efficiency with which structures can be built. The more constructible a structure is, the more economical it will be. Constructability is in part a reflection of the quality of the design documents; that is, if the design documents are difficult to understand and interpret, the project will be difficult to build.

The term refers to:

- the extent to which the design of the building facilitates ease of construction, subject to the overall requirements for the completed building (CIRIA definition).
- the effective and timely integration of construction knowledge into the conceptual planning, design, construction, and field operations of a project to achieve the overall project objectives in the best possible time and accuracy at the most cost-effective levels (CII definition).
- the integration of construction knowledge in the project delivery process and balancing the various project and environmental constraints to achieve the project goals and building performance at the optimal level.(CIIA definition).

== Principles ==
There are 12 principles of constructability which are mapped on to the procurement process:

1. Integration
2. Construction knowledge
3. Team skills
4. Corporate objectives
5. Available resources
6. External factors
7. Programme
8. Construction methodology
9. Accessibility
10. Specifications
11. Construction innovation
12. Feedback
