= Construction industry in the United Kingdom =

The construction industry is one of the major industry sectors in the economy of the United Kingdom, contributing about 6% of UK gross value added (GVA) in 2019. In 2024, it was the sixth biggest construction sector in the world by GVA.

== Scale and composition ==
Before the COVID-19 pandemic, the value of construction new work peaked at £119,087 million in 2019, dropping to £99,651 million in 2020. Of this total, new housing comprised £37,755 million of new work, infrastructure £22,517 million, and private commercial building £24,614 million. In 2024, the value of new work reached £140,684 million. Public sector work (housing, infrastructure, other) accounted for £41,123 million or 29% by value of new work in 2024.

The construction sector employed around 2.1 million workers (1.4 million employed in 370,770 VAT/PAYE-registered businesses, plus 692,000 self-employed) in Great Britain in 2024. There is a high proportion of small businesses: just over one million small/medium-sized businesses (SMEs), mainly self-employed individuals, worked in the sector in 2019, comprising about 18% of all UK businesses. Tier 1 suppliers in 2013 estimated that 50% by value of their government construction work and supply was delivered by SME sub-contractors and suppliers. Over a third of construction businesses in 2020 were located in London and south east England. Women comprised 12.5% of the UK construction workforce in 2019.

== Industry strategy ==
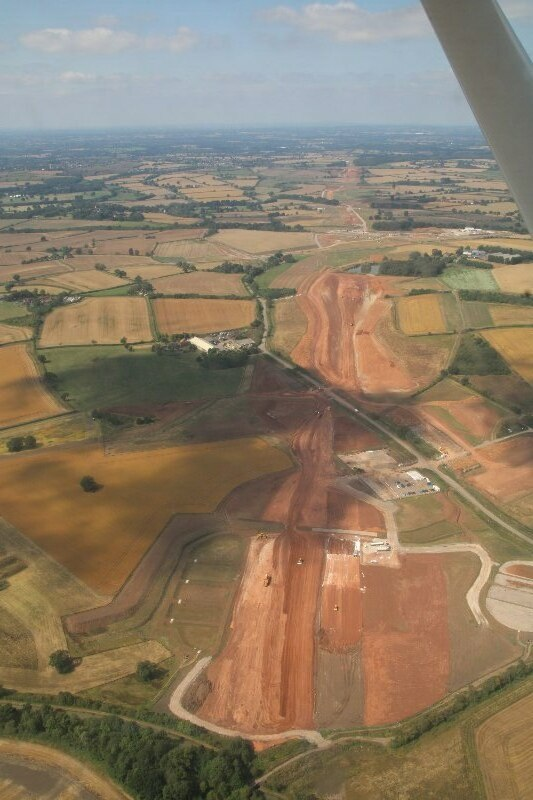
HS2 construction near Leamington Spa in August 2021

Productivity in construction remains below the UK average and has changed little in the past 50 years. As a result, the UK government has repeatedly tried to improve the sector's efficiency, publishing (among others) the Latham Report in 1994, the Egan Report in 1998 and the Farmer Review in 2016; in 2013 it launched the Construction 2025 industrial strategy, which has since been updated through the 2018 industrial strategy, the 2019 Construction Sector Deal, the 2020 Construction Playbook, and the 2021 Transforming Infrastructure Performance: Roadmap to 2030.

As of 2022, the largest construction project in the UK is construction of the High Speed 2 rail line between London and the West Midlands. Prior to completion of construction, Crossrail was Europe's biggest construction project.

The industry was pushed into a period of turmoil following the Brexit vote in June 2016. Fears of post-Brexit EU labour shortages were cited as a key reason for the uncertainty. Further disruption followed during the COVID-19 pandemic from 2020 onwards, and there were inflationary pressures as a consequence of rising fuel prices following the 2022 Russian invasion of Ukraine and the 2026 Iran war.

In 2023, the construction industry accounted for 11% of UK company insolvencies as businesses were affected by rising inflation and interest rates.

== Health and safety ==
Construction accounted for 39 of the 142 work fatalities reported in 2021-22, with half of deaths over a five-year period attributed to falls from height. Construction's fatal injury rate (1.62 per 100,000 workers) is around four times higher than the all industry rate. Around 1.8% of construction workers reported musculoskeletal disorders - a higher rate than for workers across all industries (1.1%).

== See also ==
- Economic impact of the COVID-19 pandemic in the United Kingdom#Construction and property
- Chief Construction Adviser to UK Government
