= Peter Hansford =

English civil engineer

Peter Hansford CBE FREng
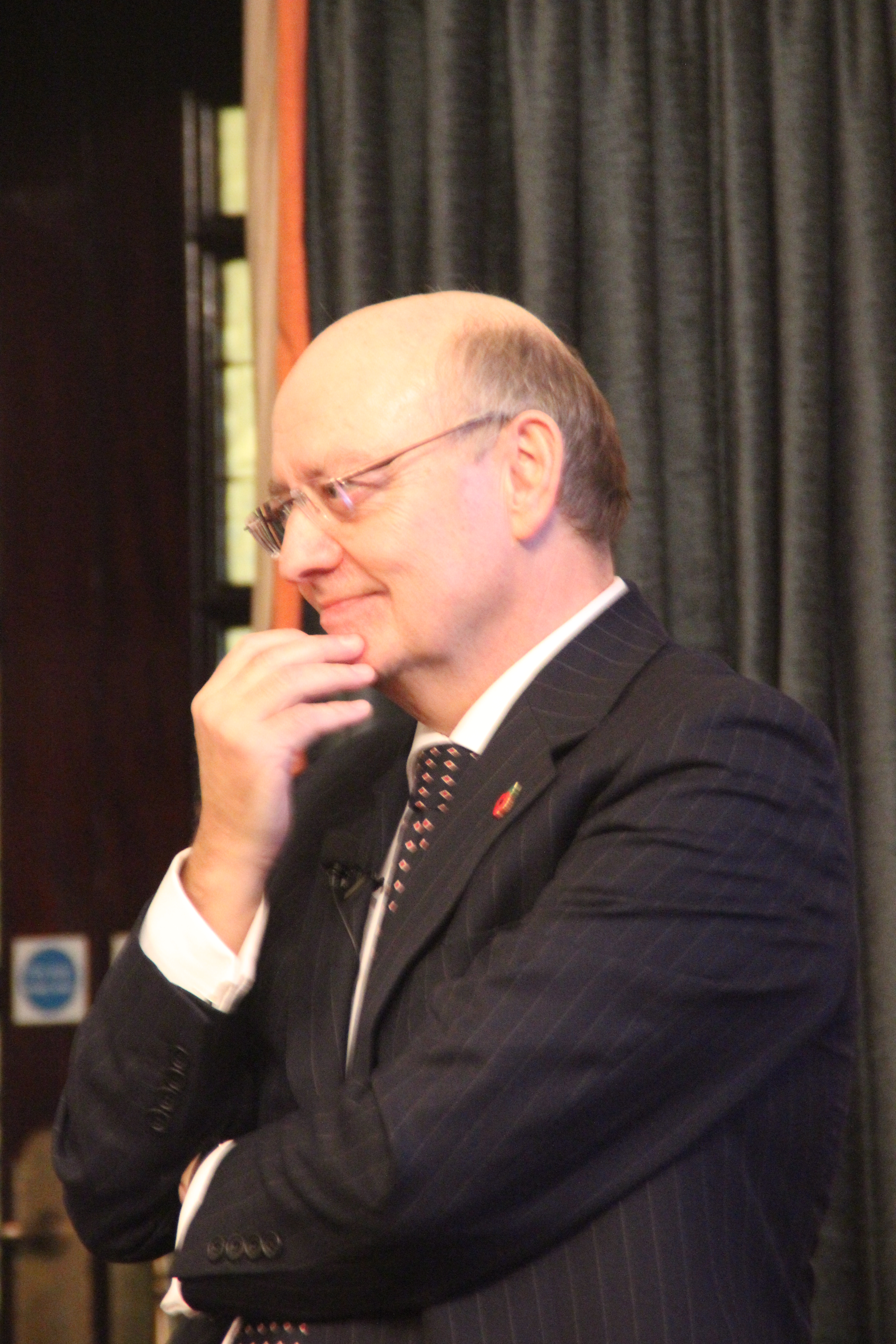
- Peter Hansford
- Education: University of Nottingham; Cranfield School of Management
- Engineering career
- Discipline: Civil engineer
- Institutions: Fellow of the Association for Project Management; Past President & Fellow of the Institution of Civil Engineers; Companion of the Chartered Management Institute

Peter George Hansford is an English civil engineer. He served as the 146th President of the Institution of Civil Engineers (ICE) (2010-2011) and succeeded Paul Morrell as the UK government's chief construction adviser in November 2012.

== Career ==
Hansford studied civil engineering at the University of Nottingham, and then worked at Amey Roadstone Construction and Maunsell Consultations Asia in Hong Kong. He later joined the Nichols Group, working as engineering manager for London's Docklands Light Railway City extension and Beckton extension projects (1989-1992). He also has an MBA from Cranfield University.

Hansford is a Fellow of the ICE and of the Association for Project Management, and chaired the ICE's expert panel contributing to the UK government's Low Carbon Construction IGT report (2010), a key building block of the industry reforms started by Morrell.

He was appointed Commander of the Order of the British Empire (CBE) in the 2020 New Year Honours for services to innovation in civil engineering.

=== Infrastructure Steering Committee ===
Hansford, ICE Past President, chaired the Infrastructure Steering Committee (ISC), a group of leading clients, consultants, contractors and academics who were a focal point for industry input into the work of the IUK Infrastructure Cost Review implementation programme. This Industry Standards Group report was prepared in response to the 2010 Infrastructure Cost Review programme.

Involved with the Infrastructure UK cost study, Hansford has also worked on various strategic reviews including ones for the Highways Agency, the Nuclear Decommissioning Authority and Network Rail.

=== Chief Construction Adviser ===
On 2 July 2014, construction minister Michael Fallon announced that Hansford's term of office would be extended to November 2015. In July 2015, the Government announced that "the role of the Chief Construction Adviser will not be continued after the incumbent Peter Hansford’s tenure ends in November 2015."

Government offices
Preceded by Paul Morrell	Chief Construction Adviser to UK Government; December 2012 – November 2015	Succeeded by discontinued (from November 2015)
Professional and academic associations
Preceded by Paul Jowitt	President of the Institution of Civil Engineers; November 2010– November 2011	Succeeded by Richard Coackley
