= Latham Report =

The Latham Report, titled Constructing the Team, was an influential report written by Sir Michael Latham, published in July 1994. Latham was commissioned by the United Kingdom government and industry organisations to review procurement and contractual arrangements in the UK construction industry, aiming to tackle controversial issues facing the industry during a period of lapse in growth as a whole.

== Historical context ==
The Latham Report was not the first report to identify systemic failings in the UK construction industry; previous reports dating back to the 1960s had identified similar issues and made similar recommendations. However, this report did gain industry and government support. (Note: In their edited book Construction Reports 1944-98 (Blackwell, 2003), Mike Murray and David Langford review a dozen reports on the construction industry including the Simon Committee Report (1944), the Banwell Report (1964) and studies from the 1960s of communication and uncertainty in the industry by the Tavistock Institute. Adamson and Pollington give a detailed account of the circumstances leading up to the commissioning of Sir Michael Latham, including a deep and prolonged economic recession from 1989 resulting in huge job losses in construction, the initiatives that followed the publication of the report, and the subsequent commissioning by the incoming New Labour government of Sir John Egan in 1997.)

== The report ==
Latham identified industry inefficiencies, condemning existing industry practices as 'adversarial', 'ineffective', 'fragmented', 'incapable of delivering for its clients' and 'lacking respect for its employees'.

He urged reform and advocated partnering and collaboration by construction companies. A key concept was that through teamwork the construction industry could delight its customers. Latham made 53 recommendations to change industry practices, to increase efficiency and to replace the bureaucratic, wasteful, adversarial atmosphere prevalent in most construction projects with one characterised by openness, co-operation, trust, honesty, commitment and mutual understanding among team members. For example:

"Partnering includes the concepts of teamwork between supplier and client, and of total continuous improvement. It requires openness between the parties, ready acceptance of new ideas, trust and perceived mutual benefit…. We are confident that partnering can bring significant benefits by improving quality and timeliness of completion whilst reducing costs." (para 6.45, p. 62)

"Partnering arrangements are also beneficial between firms…. Such arrangements should have the principal objective of improving performance and reducing costs for clients. They should not become 'cosy'. The construction process exists to satisfy the client. Good relationships based on mutual trust benefit clients." (para 6.46, p. 62)

=== Recommendations ===
1. The government should commit itself to being a best practice client.
2. The private sector should get together to establish a construction clients forum.
3. The Construction Industry Council (CIC) should issue a guide to briefing for clients.
4. The DoE should publish a simply worded construction strategy code of practice.
5. A checklist of design responsibilities should be prepared.
6. The use of co-ordinated project information should be a contractual requirement.
7. The responsibilities for building services design should be clearly defined.
8. A set of basic principles is required on which modern contract should be based.
9. A complete family of interlocking contractual documents is required.
10. A target should be set for 33% of government funded projects starting over the next four years to use the New Engineering Contract.
11. The role and duties of project managers requires to be more clearly defined.
12. The DoE should develop quality registers of approved contractors, sub-contractors and consultants.
13. Guidance should be issued on rationalising tender list arrangements and on partnering.
14. The specific efforts of BS5750 in the construction process requires further investigation.
15. Adjudication should be the normal form of dispute resolution.

== Legacy ==
The Report spawned a raft of initiatives including the establishment of the Construction Industry Board to oversee reform. At the request of the Construction Clients' Forum (formed following Latham's recommendation), the CIB published a further report, Partnering in the Team in 1996. In parallel, the industry reform group, the Reading Construction Forum, published Trusting the Team: the Best Practice Guide to Partnering in Construction in 1995 (for which Latham wrote the foreword).

Subsequent initiatives included the 1998 Egan Report Re-thinking construction, and the establishment of industry change organisations including the Design Build Foundation (1997) Construction Best Practice Programme, the IT Construction Best Practice Programme, Movement for Innovation and Constructing Excellence. The Latham and Egan Reports' focus on collaboration was also referenced by Chief Construction Adviser Paul Morrell in the UK government construction strategy in 2011.

Latham's call for quality registers of approved contractors, sub-contractors and consultants led to the 1998 establishment of Constructionline.

The Latham Review commended the establishment of the Interdisciplinary Design for the Built Environment programme at the University of Cambridge (page 73) and in turn was one of the influences that helped to shape the early syllabus of the IDBE course.
