= Construction Clients' Group =

United Kingdom construction organisation

The Construction Clients' Group is a United Kingdom construction organisation representing major clients of the construction industry. It represents the views of clients to the Strategic Forum for Construction and other major industry forums.

Its members include public and private sector organisations such as National Highways, Land Securities, Heathrow Airport, Department of Health and London Underground, responsible for significant annual investment in construction projects.

== History ==
In 1994, a group of industry clients formed a lobbying organisation, the Construction Clients' Forum, which later became the Confederation of Construction Clients. In 2004, it took on its current name, and was part of the British Property Federation. In 2011 it was agreed to position the Construction Clients’ Group within Constructing Excellence, while maintaining its independent status.
