= Rob Holden =

Robert David Holden CBE (born 6 April 1956) is a British accountant, born in Manchester. He holds a degree in Economics from Lancaster University.

Holden initially worked at the Barrow-in-Furness shipyard, working on Trident.

In 1996, Holden became finance director of London and Continental Railways ("LCR") and soon moved on to chief executive and chairman of LCR and also Eurostar. He oversaw the two phase construction of a high speed railway line from the Channel Tunnel to London at a cost of over £5b. The first phase, which terminated at Waterloo station opened in 2003.

The second phase, from Ebbsfleet, Kent, into St Pancras Station was opened as High Speed One on 6 November 2007. The grand opening of St Pancras station was attended by Queen Elizabeth II, the Duke of Edinburgh and the prime minister, Gordon Brown. Holden was appointed a Commander of the Order of the British Empire (CBE) in the 2009 New Year Honours for services to the rail industry.

In 2009 he was appointed chief executive of Crossrail, building a new train line across London. Rob Holden took home £554,495 in pay and benefits, more than £160,000 above the pay package received by TfL commissioner Peter Hendy, who has refused to take his £132,409 bonus. (thisislondon.co.uk)

In January 2011 Holden announced his departure from the post of Chief Executive of Crossrail. "It's time in my career to fulfil my ambition for a portfolio of non-executive jobs," Holden told the Daily Telegraph."If I didn't make the move now, I never will. If I stayed at Crossrail until its completion, I will be 63 and that would be too late.The time is right. We awarded major tunneling contracts just before Christmas and now there is no doubt about the project." Philip Hammond, the Transport Secretary, paid tribute saying "Rob has been a great champion for Crossrail during his time in charge of the project, taking it from Royal Assent to the start of construction. Of course, I would have been delighted if he had committed the next eight years of his life to the project but I understand his reasons for leaving and I wish him every success in the future. Thanks to Rob a robust management structure is in place which will ensure the project will continue successfully and will transform London’s transport landscape. The Government is committed to Crossrail and I look forward to working closely with Rob’s successor."

Holden is married with two children, and lives in Hertfordshire.
