= Construction partnering =

Construction partnering is a type of business partnering used in the architecture, engineering and construction industry. Partnering is intended to assist project teams with setting goals, resolving disputes and improving project outcomes. The construction partnering team is made up of the project's owner (client), the consulting engineers and/or architects, the contractor(s) and other key project stakeholders. Construction partnering has been used both in the United States and elsewhere since the early 1980s as a methodology to reduce litigation and improve productivity.

== Objective ==
The objective of construction partnering is to reduce project costs and schedules, eliminate change orders and claims, and improve communication by developing mutually agreed upon project and partnership success goals and by monitoring the achievement of these goals for the duration of the project. The construction partnering team will also develop an agreed upon process for resolving disputes should they arise, called a dispute resolution ladder.

== History ==
Litigation in the construction industry exploded in the 1980s. Settling disputes in court added time, cost and energy to projects. Partnering was developed as a response to this problem.

In 1987, the Construction Industry Institute (CII) at The University of Texas at Austin formed a task force to explore a process to address the issues that brought the people involved in construction projects to litigation. The task force's objectives were to examine the risks and benefits of partnering, to provide guidelines on the process and to define the relationship between partnering and the construction contract. Their results were published in January 1991 entitled, "In Search of Partnering Excellence."

The United States Army Corps of Engineers (USACE) joined the Construction Industry Institute (CII) task force and began using partnering in the late 1980s on two construction projects. Following successful outcomes, USACE established a formal partnering program in 1991, including a pamphlet outlining the process, rationale, and observed benefits.

In January 1991, the Associated General Contractors of America (AGC) endorsed partnering as a strategy to improve construction quality. AGC later introduced the Marvin M. Black Award to recognize contractors involved in the year's most collaborative projects.

Over the past three decades, partnering has expanded significantly. Twenty-four U.S. state transportation programs have adopted it as a standard practice. Agencies such as Caltrans, Maryland SHA, ODOT, and ADOT now include partnering as a specification requirement.

== Awards ==
Construction partnering has been widely adopted within the industry, leading to the establishment of various awards recognizing outstanding partnered projects. Current awards include:

- AGC's Marvin M. Black Partnering Competition
- AGC's Excellence in Partnering Award
- Arizona Transportation's Partnering Excellence Awards
- Caltrans' Excellence in Partnering
- International Partnering Institute's Annual Partnering Awards
- Kansas Department of Transportation's KCA/KDOT Partnering Awards
- Nevada Department of Transportation's Excellence in Partnering Awards
- Ohio DOT's Don Conway Partnering Award
