= Trade Association Forum =

British trade association umbrella organisation

- Abbreviation: TAF
- Formation: 1997; 29 years ago
- Founder: UK Government and then president of the Board of Trade Michael Heseltine
- Type: Association
- Purpose: Provide a community of British trade associations
- Location: London, United Kingdom
- Region served: United Kingdom
- Members: 180 trade associations (2025)
- Website: www.taforum.org

The Trade Association Forum (TAF) is a British umbrella body for industry trade associations in the United Kingdom, representing more than 180 trade associations that in turn represent more than 180,000 businesses from every sector of the economy.

It is not a policy influencing or lobbying body, but instead champions the role of trade associations in the UK and provides its members with services to assist them in the running of their organisations, as well as providing information to buyers, government departments, and the public about UK trade associations and business sectors.

TAF provides a range of services and events to support its members - it maintains a Directory that provides information on UK trade associations, runs annual conferences and awards, offers events and training and a range of other member benefits.

== History ==
Established in 1997, TAF was originally supported with seed funding by the then Department of Trade and Industry (now called the Department of Business and Trade) following a series of speeches by the then President of the Board of Trade Michael Heseltine from 1993 onwards about the effectiveness and role of trade associations. These resulted in the publication of a paper by the DTI in 1996 entitled 'A Best Practice Guide for the Model Trade Association', which in turn led to the creation of TAF as a means of fostering best practice and developing networks across UK trade associations.

Following its establishment, TAF was originally housed within the Confederation of British Industry (CBI) but since 2014 has been a standalone organisation governed by a Board of representatives drawn from its members. The organisation is still supported by the Department of Business and Trade, with a senior civil servant co-opted to the board and with ministers and civil servants appearing at TAF events.
