= Paul Morrell =

English chartered quantity surveyor

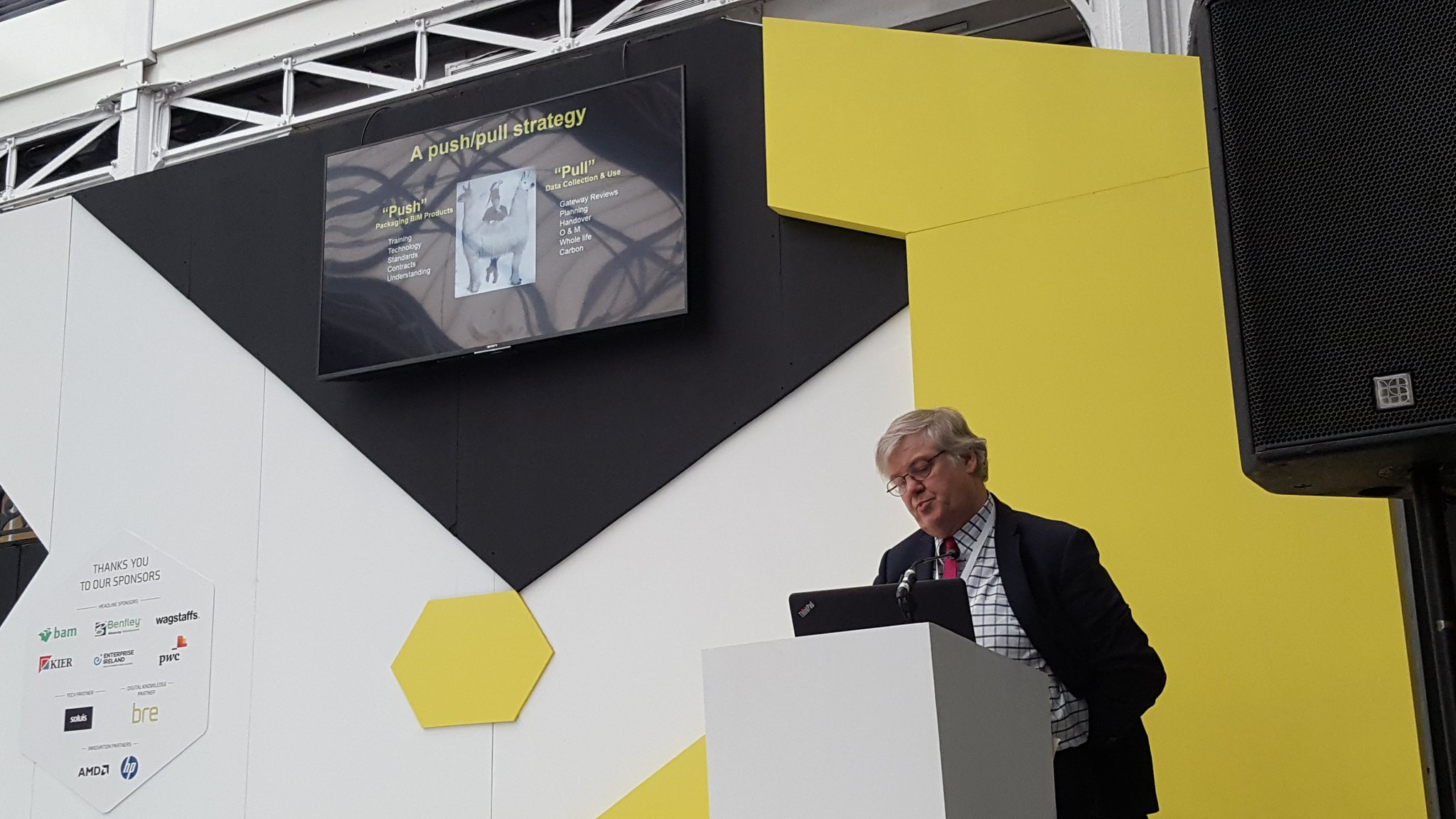
Paul Morrell, speaking at London conference, 26 October 2016

Paul Dring Morrell OBE (born 28 February 1948) is an English chartered quantity surveyor. Formerly senior partner of Davis Langdon, he was, from November 2009 to November 2012, the UK Government's first Chief Construction Adviser, and was later appointed to lead government reviews of training boards and construction product testing.

== Career ==
After graduating from the College of Estate Management, Morrell joined construction consultancy Davis Langdon, and worked on major construction projects in both the public and private sectors, with a particular emphasis on arts projects, hotels and commercial developments. He eventually became senior partner, before leaving in 2007.

Morrell was a founder member of the British Council for Offices (president in 2004–2005), is a Fellow of the Royal Institution of Chartered Surveyors and Honorary Fellow of the Royal Institute of British Architects, and has served as a commissioner on the UK's Commission for Architecture and the Built Environment (2000–2008; also serving as deputy chairman). In the 2007 Building Awards, he received the Award for Outstanding Contribution to the Construction Industry. He was appointed OBE for services to architecture and the built environment in the 2009 New Year Honours list.

=== Chief construction advisor ===
The "creation of a post of Chief Construction Officer" was recommended by the House of Commons Business and Enterprise Select Committee in July 2008. Paul Morrell was appointed to this pan-departmental role, with a slightly revised title of 'chief construction advisor', in November 2009; the role was initially for two years, and Morrell was re-appointed for a further term in October 2011. The UK government directly or indirectly provides around 40% of the construction industry's workload so its influence as a client is significant.

Morrell has also been keen to improve the efficiency, cost-effectiveness and sustainability of construction work for the UK government; he led the UK Government, Innovation and Growth Team, that produced an influential report, Low Carbon Construction published in November 2010. He was also the instigator of the Government Construction Strategy (published in May 2011) which, echoing the earlier Latham and Egan Reports, told the sector to work more collaboratively and to use information technology – notably building information modelling (BIM) – to support the design, construction and long-term operation and maintenance of its built assets. Morrell is a strong advocate of BIM, having publicly backed its use in 2010, and BIM was made mandatory for all centrally-procured public sector construction projects from 2016.

In March 2012, it was reported that Morrell would step down from the advisor role in November 2012, prompting the start of a search for his successor. In July 2012 it was announced that civil engineer and former ICE president Peter Hansford would take over as chief construction adviser after 30 November 2012.

Morrell was an invited lecturer on the Interdisciplinary Design for the Built Environment masters programme at Cambridge University.

=== Edge Commission ===
Paul Morrell was the author of Collaborating for Change, an April 2015 report published by the Edge Commission on the future of professionalism among the built environment institutions.

=== Training boards ===
In October 2016, the government's skills minister Robert Halfon appointed Paul Morrell to lead a review of industrial training boards, with the future of the Construction Industry Training Board (CITB) central to the review. The report Building Support: the review of the Industry Training Boards was published in November 2017.

=== Construction product testing review ===
In April 2021, Morrell was appointed by housing secretary Robert Jenrick to chair an independent review of current systems for testing construction products. The review's final report was published in April 2023, describing historic failings in the system for testing and assuring construction products made available for sale.

Government offices
Preceded by new role	Chief Construction Adviser to UK Government; November 2009 – November 2012	Succeeded by Peter Hansford (from December 2012)
