= Scottish Building Federation =

Construction trade association

Scottish Building Federation logo

The Scottish Building Federation (SBF) is a United Kingdom construction trade association representing employers in the Scottish construction industry.

The SBF was established in 1895, and aims to raise awareness of the importance of the construction industry in Scotland. With a headquarters in Edinburgh, it comprises 16 regional associations, and represents around 700 companies.

In 2013, it highlighted the construction industry impact of the Great Recession, reporting that the Scottish construction sector had laid off 62,500 people since 2008. Total employment in the sector was down to 172,700, the lowest level of construction employment since current records began in 2004. In 2017, it claimed Scottish construction was stuck in a “state of limbo” because of uncertainties arising from Brexit. MD Vaughan Hart said: "ongoing uncertainty on the political and constitutional fronts is making industry employers feel quite nervous about the future outlook."

The SBF was one of the founders of the Construction Alliance. It is also represented on the Scottish Building Contracts Committee.

In June 2024, it announced plans to merge with its England-based counterpart, the National Federation of Builders.
