= The Building Centre =

Coordinates: 51.5195°N 0.1316°W

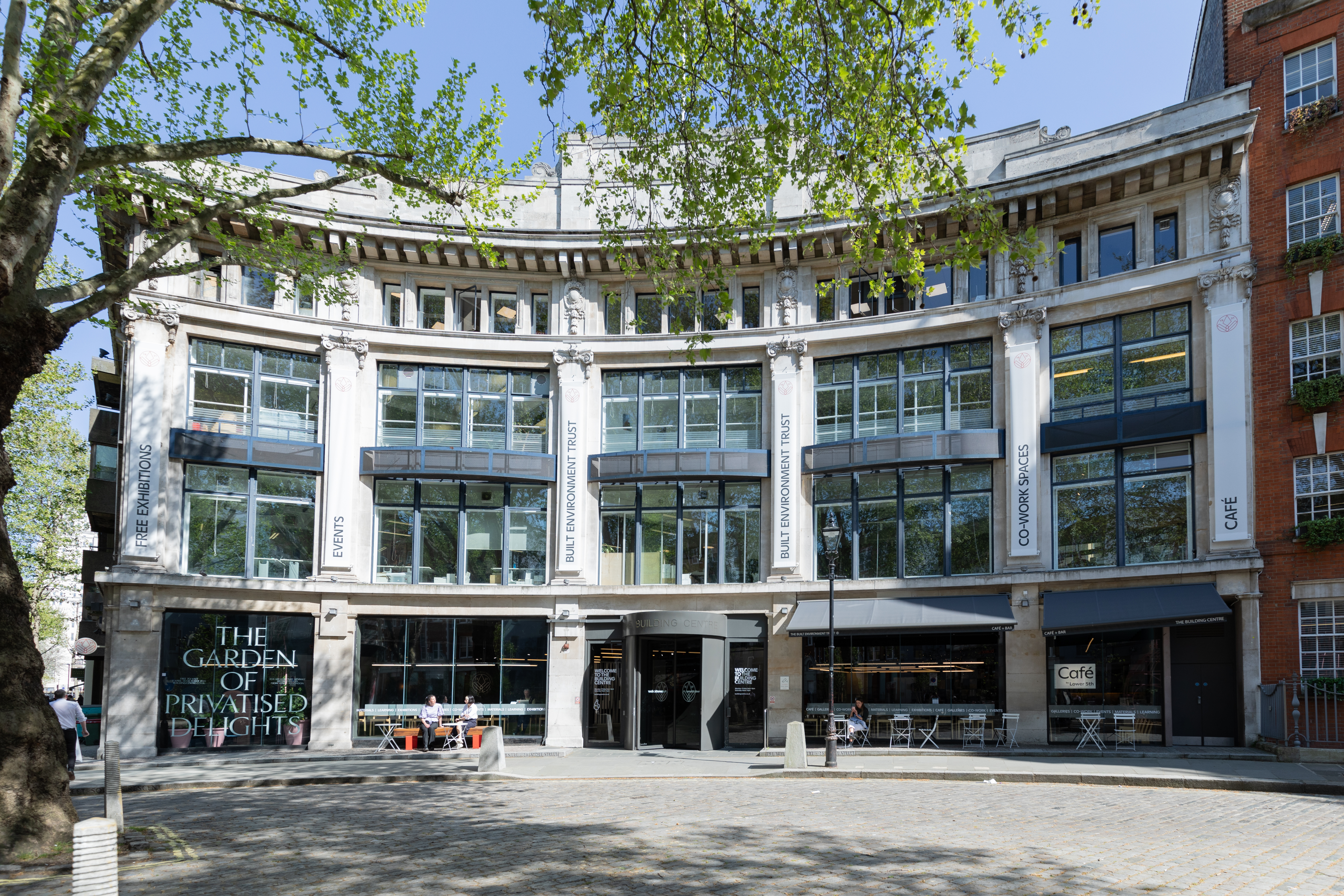
The Building Centre - May 2022 by Chris Jackson

The Building Centre is a building in central London for venue hire, used to promote innovation in the built environment. It is run by the Built Environment Trust, a charitable body which was formed in 2015 to replace an earlier charity, the Building Centre Trust, established in 1963.

== Formation ==
The centre was founded in 1931 starting as the building materials bureau of the Architectural Association. Its first managing director was Frank Yerbury, architectural photographer and secretary of the Architectural Association School, and its first chairman was Maurice Webb. It opened its doors on 7 September 1932 at 158 New Bond Street

== Locations ==
The Building Centre operated from New Bond Street until its building was destroyed during The Blitz on 12 May 1941. As a result, it moved to Conduit Street and was based there until 1951, when it moved to its present home in Store Street. The building had been designed by the modernist architects Taperell and Haase as a Daimler motor showroom. It is built of reinforced concrete, faced with Portland stone. When converted to the Building Centre, a sgraffito mural by Augustus Lunn was installed in the open-air courtyard and patio, although this has since been hidden or lost.

== Notable people ==
- Sir Giles Gilbert Scott, President from 1940 - 1959
- Sir Basil Spence, President from 1960 - 1968
- Sir Frederick Gibberd, President in 1969
- Sir Alfred Hurst, Chairman from 1940 - 1962

== Organisations at the Building Centre ==
Organisations located at the building include: the Built Environment Trust, the Construction Industry Council, the Construction Products Association, and the UK Green Building Council.

=== Current services ===
The building has an array of venue hire facilities, including galleries, seminar and conference rooms, and photography exhibition areas. Admission to the galleries on the ground floor and lower ground floor is free. There is a cafe open to the public with vegetarian, vegan and gluten free options, and indoor and outdoor seating.

== Early key exhibitions ==
- 1933 - Three-bedroom cottages competition
- 1936 - Inn Signs Exhibition
- 1936 - Women in Architecture
- 1940 - Railings for Scrap
