= Civil Engineering Contractors Association =

United Kingdom construction organisation

Civil Engineering Contractors Association logo

The Civil Engineering Contractors Association (CECA) is a United Kingdom construction organisation. Headquartered in London, it was established in 1996 to represent the interests of civil engineering contractors.

== History ==
The Civil Engineering Contractors Association was founded in November 1996 after the dissolution of the Federation of Civil Engineering Contractors. Its first chairman was Peter Andrews, then chairman of the European Construction Industry Federation's (FIEC) south eastern section. Andrews later served a second term as CECA chair in 2006 before stepping down in March 2009 due to health problems.

In 2017, CECA started an annual campaign, "Stop. Make a Change" promoting awareness of health, safety and wellbeing issues in construction and engineering. This subsequently expanded from a single awareness day to become a two-week event by 2022, supported by a growing number of participating organisations.

The organisation has also urged action to address skills shortages in the civil engineering sector, saying these have hindered investment in UK infrastructure.

== Operations ==
CECA maintains a national office in Westminster, and offices in all six English regions - Southern, South West, Midlands, Yorkshire & The Humber, North East and North West - as well as in the devolved nations of Scotland and Wales.

Its membership currently comprises over 320 companies, ranging from small regional businesses to the largest multinationals operating across the UK and overseas. Collectively, CECA members account for c.80% of civil engineering work undertaken in the UK, directly employ c.250,000 people, and deliver work worth an estimated £30 billion annually to the economy of the United Kingdom.
