= John Egan (industrialist) =

British industrialist (born 1939)

Sir John Leopold Egan DL FIC (born 7 November 1939) is a British industrialist, associated with businesses in the automotive, airports, construction and water industries. He was chief executive and chairman of Jaguar Cars from 1980 to 1990 and chairman of Jaguar plc from 1985 to 1990, and then was chief executive of BAA from 1990 to 1999. He chaired the construction industry task force that produced the 1998 Egan Report (Rethinking Construction) and the follow-up report, Accelerating Change, in 2002. During 2004, undertook the Egan Review of Skills for Sustainable Communities for the Blair Government. In 2004, after completing two years as president of the Confederation of British Industry, he was appointed chairman of Severn Trent.

== Career ==
John Egan was born in Rawtenstall, Lancashire, the son of a garage owner. The family moved to Coventry where he went to Bablake School. He studied petroleum engineering at Imperial College London and subsequently from 1962 to 1966 worked for Shell in the Middle East. After further studies, this time at London Business School, he moved to AC Delco in 1968 and then British Leyland where he played a part in boosting the fortunes of its Unipart business.

After a four-year spell as Corporate Parts Director of Massey Ferguson, Egan was appointed chairman of Jaguar Cars in 1980, turning round what had been a struggling business. A carmaker facing closure when he took over was sold ten years later to Ford for £1.6bn, at which time (March 1990) Egan moved to become Chief Executive of BAA.

He was the chancellor of Coventry University between 2007 and 2017.

He was knighted in the 1986 Birthday Honours.

== Honours ==
- Honorary doctorate, University of Bath, 1988
- Honorary doctorate, Brunel University, 1997

Academic offices
Preceded by Henry Plumb, Baron Plumb	Chancellor of Coventry University; 2007–present	Succeeded by Incumbent
