= Business partnering =

Concept in business and economics

Business partnering is the development of successful, long term, strategic relationships between customers and suppliers, based on achieving best practice and sustainable competitive advantage. The term also refers to a business partnering support service model, where professionals such as HR staff work closely with business leaders and line managers to achieve shared organisational objectives. In practice, the internal business partner model can be broadened to include members of other business functions such as finance, IT, legal services and marketing, which act as connectors, linking the functions with business units to ensure that the technical, or functional, expertise they have to offer is placed within the real and current concerns of the business to create value.

"Partnering is the process of two or more entities creating synergistic solutions to their challenges."

== Internal business partnering ==
The term financial business partnering is used to describe finance executives working alongside various business departments including operations, human resources, sales and marketing, among others, providing financial information, tools, analysis and insight, which allows companies to make more informed decisions while driving business strategy.

Although finance business partnering has been around for many years, it has taken on increased importance, particularly due to the 2008 financial crisis. Increasingly, companies are looking to form "stronger partnerships" between the finance department and other parts of the business, and to "integrate" the finance team more closely into the business.

== External business partnering ==
The advantages of partnering with suppliers have been emphasised, for example Carlisle and Parker refer to partnering with suppliers. In the construction field, construction partnering reflects the principles of business partnering with suppliers and subcontractors. Account intelligence sharing reselling or "value chain integration" (Child, Faulkner, 1998) are examples of tactical partnering initiatives. Joint product development is a typical strategic partnering activity. Partnering agreements are commonly used in the different kind of partnerships. Partnering requires all partners to transform their businesses in terms of relationships, behaviours, processes, communications and leadership. Neither participant can succeed without the other so the recommended approach is to implement the transformation as a joint activity wherever possible.

Partnering has existed for centuries. In economics, business partnering has gained significant momentum and focus within leading global businesses, as "a medium for achieving significant revenue growth" (Doz, Hamel, 1998).

=== Formation of business partnering ===
Business partnering can take the form of a strategic alliance, a buyer-supplier relationship, a joint venture, or a consortium. Firms should pay particular attention to the mechanisms of governance used to organize their partnership. They can rely on a combination of contractual and relational mechanisms.

Firms usually need to form partnerships with other firms to enable their business model (Teece, 2010). To become attractive to other businesses firms need to align their internal features, such as management style and products with the market situation. In a 2013 study, Johan Kask and Gabriel Linton develop two ideal profiles, or also known as configurations or archetypes, for startups commercializing inventions. The Inheritor profile calls for management style that is not too entrepreneurial (more conservative) and the startup should have an incremental invention (building on a previous standard). This profile is set out to be more successful (in finding a business partner) in a market that has a dominant design (a clear standard is applied in this market). In contrast to this profile is the Originator which has a management style that is highly entrepreneurial and have a radical invention (totally new standard). This profile is set out to be more successful (in finding a business partner) in a market that does not have a dominant design (established standard). New startups should align themselves to one of the profiles when commercializing an invention to be able to find and be attractive to a business partner. By finding a business partner a startup will have greater chances to become successful. Reduction of general costs: business partnering can be cheaper and more flexible than a merger or acquisition, and can be employed when a merger or acquisition is not feasible.

Business partnering increases "competitive advantage" (Porter, 1985). The direct benefits of business partnering consist in greater competitive advantage through cooperation (the co-opetitive advantage) and even better opportunities of revenue, occupation and investment in the sector of application.

Business partnering creates a no more traditionally-based solidarity or "organic", but a rationale form of "mechanic solidarity" (Durkheim, 1893). Partnering takes a new approach to achieving business objectives. It replaces the traditional customer-supplier model with a collaborative approach to achieving a shared objective; this may be to build a hospital, improve an existing service contract or launch an entirely new programme of work. Essentially, partners work together to achieve an agreed common aim whilst each participant may still retain different reasons for achieving that common aim.

=== Examples ===
The mission of business partnering and the key-aspects of the discipline have been developed recently in the tourism field. The mission of business partnering (for tourism) consists in "creating, organizing, developing and enforcing operative (short-term), tactical (medium-term) and strategic (long-term) partnerships".

Companies whose reach to end-consumers is handled through supporting companies refer to "channel partners".

== See also ==
- Business partner
- Strategic alliance
