= Chief Construction Adviser to UK Government =

British civil service appointment

The role of chief construction and scientific adviser is a British civil service appointment. Initially called chief construction adviser, the role was created by United Kingdom ministers in 2009 to provide cross-departmental coordination and leadership on UK construction industry policy. It was discontinued in 2015. In 2024, the Grenfell Tower Inquiry recommended resurrecting the role. In October 2025, an interim adviser was appointed followed a year later by the appointment of Sergio Cavalaro as the third permanent adviser.

== History ==
The "creation of a post of Chief Construction Officer" was recommended by the House of Commons Business and Enterprise Select Committee in July 2008. The UK government directly or indirectly provides around 30% of the construction industry's workload so its influence as a client is significant. Public sector work (housing, infrastructure, other) accounted for £41,123 million or 29% by value of new work in 2024.

Paul Morrell was the first person appointed to this pan-departmental role, with a slightly revised title of 'chief construction adviser', in November 2009; the role was initially for two years, and Morrell was re-appointed for a further one-year term in October 2011.

In July 2012, Morrell's successor, Peter Hansford, was announced. Hansford took up the role on 1 December 2012. On 2 July 2014, construction minister Michael Fallon announced that Hansford's term of office would be extended to November 2015. To the dismay of many in the industry, in July 2015, the Conservative Government announced that "the role of the Chief Construction Adviser will not be continued after the incumbent Peter Hansford’s tenure ends in November 2015."

In September 2024, the final report of the Grenfell Tower Inquiry recommended bringing back the role of chief construction adviser to provide advice "on all matters affecting the construction industry", including monitoring government work relating to building regulations and statutory guidance. The adviser would also alert the secretary of state to construction issues about which the government should be aware. Former adviser Paul Morrell ruled himself out, and said there was a "very limited" pool of candidates fit for the role, largely because their commercial interests might exclude them. In February 2025, as part of its response to the Grenfell Inquiry's final report, the government was set to start the process of appointing a new chief construction adviser, likely to work in the Ministry of Housing, Communities and Local Government (MHCLG).

In May 2025, it announced that an interim chief construction adviser would be appointed in the summer of 2025, with a permanent successor likely to be appointed in 2026. On 1 October 2025, MHCLG announced the interim appointment of Thouria Istephan, once an architect at Foster and Partners and a member of the Grenfell Tower Inquiry panel. Istephan was appointed for an interim 12-month term and on a part-time basis, and produced her final report in September 2026.

In February 2026, MHCLG announced the role would be given scientific adviser status with an amended title: chief construction and scientific adviser. In October 2026, Sergio Cavalaro was announced as the third permanent adviser.

== Advisers ==
- 2009–2012 - Paul Morrell
- 2012–2015 - Peter Hansford
- 2025–2026 - Thouria Istephan (interim)
- 2026–present - Sergio Cavalaro
