= Cambridge Institute for Sustainability Leadership =

British university department

- Type: Public
- Established: 1989; 37 years ago
- Address: Entopia Building, 1 Regent Street, Cambridge, United Kingdom
- Website: www.cisl.cam.ac.uk

The Cambridge Institute for Sustainability Leadership (CISL), formerly the Cambridge Programme for Sustainability Leadership and the Cambridge Programme for Industry, is part of the University of Cambridge.

The institute works with leaders to tackle critical global challenges through action research, convening business groups and executive education. It has centres in Cambridge, Cape Town, and Brussels.

Polly Courtice was founder director of the institute from 1989 to 2021. King Charles III is its patron.

== History ==
The Cambridge Institute for Sustainability Leadership was founded in 1989. It was formerly known as the Cambridge Programme for Industry, and then Cambridge Programme for Sustainability Leadership.

In 2015 the Institute launched its Rewiring the Economy framework setting out ten collaborative tasks for business, policy and finance leaders to lay the foundations for a sustainable global economy.

== Governance and people ==
The Institute is governed by a Management Board and an Advisory Board and has Fellows and Senior Associates from across academia and business who are involved with programme design and delivery, research and work with business leaders groups.

Polly Courtice was founder director of the institute from 1989 to 2021. She was made a Dame in the 2016 Queen's 2016 Birthday Honours for services to sustainability leadership.

As of 2024 the King is its patron.

== Alumni ==
The Institute has over 16,000 alumni from its executive and graduate education for sustainability leadership and a network of companies that belong to its Leaders Groups.

== The Prince of Wales's Business & Sustainability Programme ==
The Prince of Wales's Business & Sustainability Programme is "an international programme for senior executives in leadership roles", established in 1994. Seminars are held around the world as well as online, and by 2024 the programme had over 4,500 alumni.

The programme runs four-day residential seminars taking place across four days (or five half-days online), comprising lectures, presentations of case studies, and discussions. Each group is carefully selected to help enable peer-to-peer learning. Each group is led by an expert facilitator, for example seminars in Melbourne have included CISL fellow Paul Gilding, and 2024 designate for Governor-General of Australia and former president of Chief Executive Women, Sam Mostyn.

There is a global steering committee which determines the core curriculum.

== Leaders groups ==
Leaders groups are business-led initiatives, convening business leaders within and across sectors to tackle sustainability issues that they could not solve alone. The current leaders groups are managed under three themes: low carbon transformation, sustainable finance and natural resource security:

- Prince of Wales's Corporate Leaders Group
- Natural Capital Leaders Platform
- ClimateWise – the insurance industry
- The Banking and Environment Initiative
- Investment Leaders Group
