= Little Miller Act =

State legislation in the United States

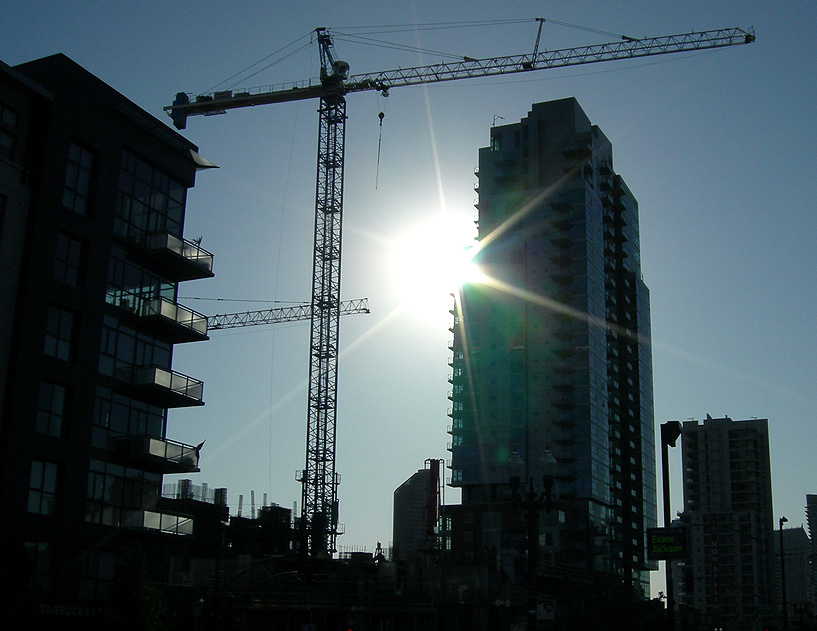
Construction in East Village, San Diego

A "Little Miller Act" is a U.S. state statute, based upon the federal Miller Act, that requires prime contractors on state construction projects to post bonds guaranteeing the performance of their contractual duties and/or the payment of their subcontractors and material suppliers.

== Typical statutory provisions ==
Little Miller Acts typically require the posting of a performance bond, a type of surety bond that covers the cost of substitute performance if the prime contractor fails to fully perform his duties under the contract.

Little Miller Acts also typically require the posting of a payment bond, which provides an alternate source of payment to the subcontractors and material suppliers who worked on the job. If the claimant did not have a direct contractual relationship with the prime contractor, the claimant is typically required to give some form of notice to the prime contractor within a specified time after the completion of the work to preserve the right to make a claim against the payment bond. The purpose of the notice requirement is to give the prime contractor an opportunity to withhold payment to the first-tier subcontractor and otherwise encourage payment to the claimant.

== Purpose and function ==
Little Miller Acts address two concerns that would otherwise exist in the performance of state government construction projects:

1. Performance Bonds: The contractor's abandonment or other non-performance of a government job may cause critical delays and added expense in the government procurement process. The bonding process helps weed out irresponsible contractors while the bond itself defrays the government's cost of substitute performance. The subrogation right of the bond surety against the contractor (i.e., the right to sue for indemnification) is a deterrent to non-performance. Bond sureties often require additional security, including personal guarantees by principals of the prime contractor, to protect themselves in the event that the prime contractor ceases doing business simultaneous with the default. This provides the prime contractor's principals with additional incentive to ensure the project is completed.
2. Payment Bonds: Subcontractors and material suppliers would otherwise be reluctant to work on such projects (knowing that sovereign immunity prevents the establishment of a mechanic's lien) - decreasing competition and driving up construction costs.

== Little Miller Acts by State ==
=== Alabama ===
Alabama Code, Title 39, Public Works, §39-1-1

Performance Bond Required:	All public works projects, 100% of contract price (Sec. 39-1-1(a)); Not required on projects under $50,000.00 (§39-1-1(e))
Payment Bond Required:	All public works projects, 50% of contract price (§39-1-1(a)); Not required on projects under $50,000.00 (§39-1-1(e))
Entitlement to Copy of Bond:	(§39-1-1(c))
Enforcement:	(§39-1-1(b)).
Limitations:	One year from date of settlement of contract (§39-1-1(b))
Notice Requirements:	45 days' notice to surety required prior to suit (§39-1-1(b))
Other:	Venue allowed in county where the project was located, or where otherwise provided by law (§39-1-1(c)); Attorneys fees and interest allowed if unpaid on 45-day notice (§39-1-1(c)); Contractor must advertise notice of contract settlement (§39-1-1(f)).

=== Alaska ===
Alaska Statutes, Title 36, Public Contracts, Chapter 36.25, Contractors' Bonds, Sections 36.25.010 through 36.25.025

Performance Bond Required:	All public works contracts over $100,000.00. equal to the amount of the payment bond (§36.25.010(a)(1))
Payment Bond Required:	All public works contracts over $100,000.00, equal to 1/2 the amount of the contract if contract amount not more than $1,000,000.00, equal to 40% of the contract if contract amount not more than $5,000,000.00, equal to $2,500,000.00 if contract amount more than $5,000,000.00 (§36.25.010(a)(2))
Entitlement to Copy of Bond:	[Information Needed]
Enforcement:	Suit if not paid within 90 days of last work (§36.25.020(a))
Limitations:	One year from settlement of contract (§36.25.020(c))
Notice Requirements:	Second tier subcontractors must give notice to contractor within ninety days of last work (§36.25.020(b))
Other:	Certification of payment by contractor required on projects not requiring a payment bond (§36.25.010(c)); Suit brought in the name of the government for the use of the claimant (§36.25.020(c)); Exemptions for municipalities contracts not exceeding $400,000.00 (§36.25.025);

=== Arizona ===
Arizona Revised Statutes, Title 34, Public Buildings and Improvements, Article 2, Contracts, Sections 34–222, 34-223 and 34-224

Performance Bond Required:	Full contract amount (§34-222(A)(1)); Bond language specified (§34-222(G))
Payment Bond Required:	Full contract amount (§34-222(A)(2)); Bond language specified (§34-222(F))
Entitlement to Copy of Bond:	Upon representation of non-payment or participation in litigation(§34-223(C))
Enforcement:	Suit if unpaid 90 days after last work (§34-223(A)); Attorney's fees (§34-222(B))
Limitations:	One year from last work (§34-223(C))
Notice Requirements:	Second tier subs must give 20-day notice within 90 days of last work (§34-223(A))
Other:	Bond surety cannot be individual and must be license by the Dept. of Insurance (§34-222(C) and bond placed on file with contracting agency (§34-222(D))

=== Arkansas ===
Arkansas Statutes, Title 22, Public Property, Chapter 9, Public Works, Subchapter 4, Contractors' Bonds, Sections 22-9-401 through 22-9-405

Performance Bond Required:	[Information Needed]
Payment Bond Required:	[Information Needed]
Entitlement to Copy of Bond:	[Information Needed]
Enforcement:	[Information Needed]
Limitations:	[Information Needed]
Notice Requirements:	[Information Needed]
Other:	[Information Needed]

=== California ===
California Civil Code, Title 3, Public Work of Improvement, Chapters 4 and 5, Payment Bond for Public Works, Sections 9558, 9502, 9204, 9358, and 9356; California Public Contract Code, Part 2, Ch. 1, Art. 7, Contract Requirements, Sections 10220 through 10230

Performance Bond Required:	Typically full contract price (§10222)
Payment Bond Required:	All public works contracts more than $25,000.00 (§3247(a)); Typically 1/2 of contract amount (§3248(a)); Not required for architects/engineers (§3247(c))
Entitlement to Copy of Bond:	Not specified
Enforcement:	(§3252)
Limitations:	Six months within the time stop notices must be filed (§3249)
Notice Requirements:	(§3252)
Other:	Attorney's fees (§3248(b)); See, Stop Notice provisions (§§9350-9510)

=== Colorado ===
Colorado Revised Statutes, Title 24, Government, State, Article 105, Colorado Procurement Code – Construction Contracts, Sections 24-105-201 through 24-105-203; Title 38, Property – Real and Personal, Article 26, Liens – Contractors' Bonds and Lien on Funds, Sections 38-26-101 and 38-26-105 through 38-26-110

Performance Bond Required:	[Information Needed]
Payment Bond Required:	[Information Needed]
Entitlement to Copy of Bond:	[Information Needed]
Enforcement:	[Information Needed]
Limitations:	[Information Needed]
Notice Requirements:	[Information Needed]
Other:	[Information Needed]

=== Connecticut ===
Connecticut General Statutes, Title 49, Mortgages and Liens, Chapter 847, Liens, Sections 49-41 through 49-43

Performance Bond Required:	[Information Needed]
Payment Bond Required:	[Information Needed]
Entitlement to Copy of Bond:	[Information Needed]
Enforcement:	[Information Needed]
Limitations:	[Information Needed]
Notice Requirements:	[Information Needed]
Other:	[Information Needed]

=== Delaware ===
Delaware Code, Title 29, State Government, Budget, Fiscal, Procurement and Contracting Regulations, Chapter 69, State Procurement, Subchapter IV, Public Works Contracting, Section 6962

Performance Bond Required:	[Information Needed]
Payment Bond Required:	[Information Needed]
Entitlement to Copy of Bond:	[Information Needed]
Enforcement:	[Information Needed]
Limitations:	[Information Needed]
Notice Requirements:	[Information Needed]
Other:	[Information Needed]

=== District of Columbia ===
District of Columbia Code, Title 2, Government Administration, Chapter 2, Contracts, Subchapter 1, Bonding Requirement, Sections 2-201.01 through 2-201.03, and 2-201.11

Performance Bond Required:	[100,000]
Payment Bond Required:	[25,000]
Entitlement to Copy of Bond:	[Information Needed]
Enforcement:	[Information Needed]
Limitations:	[Information Needed]
Notice Requirements:	[Information Needed]
Other:	[Information Needed]

=== Florida ===
Florida Statutes, Title XVIII, Public Lands and Property, Chapter 255, Public Property and Publicly Owned Buildings, Section 255.05

Performance Bond Required:	All public construction, works, or repair, over at least $100,000 (possible exemption up to $200,000, at the contract issuer's discretion, s. 255.05 4(d)). Full amount of contract, up to $250 million, with "largest amount reasonably available" for larger projects (s. 255.05 4(g)).
Payment Bond Required:	All public construction, works, or repair, over at least $100,000 (possible exemption up to $200,000, at the contract issuer's discretion, s. 255.05 4(d)). Full amount of contract, up to $250 million, with "largest amount reasonably available" for larger projects (s. 255.05 4(g)).
Entitlement to Copy of Bond:	Bond must be
Enforcement:	[Information Needed]
Limitations:	[Information Needed]
Notice Requirements:	[Information Needed]
Other:	[Information Needed]

=== Georgia ===
Georgia Code, Title 13, Contracts, Chapter 10, Contracts for Public Works, Sections 13-10-1 – 13-10-2 and 13-10-40 through 13-10-65; Title 36, Local Government Provisions Appliable to Counties, Municipal Corporations, and Other Governmental Entities, Chapter 91, Public Works Bidding Sections 36-91-1 – 36-91-2, 36-91-40 and 36-91-70 through 36-91-95

Performance Bond Required:	All public works construction contracts greater than $100,000.00. Bond shall be in the amount of at least the total amount of the contract and shall be increased as the contract amount is increased (§ 36-91-70, § 13-10-40)
Payment Bond Required:	All public works construction contracts greater than $100,000.00. Bond shall be in the amount of at least the total amount of the contract and shall be increased if requested by the governmental entity as the contract amount is increased (§ 36-91-90, § 13-10-60)
Entitlement to Copy of Bond:	Upon submission of affidavit stating that applicant has supplied labor or materials for and payment has not been made or stating that applicant is being sued on the bond (§ 36-91-94, § 13-10-64)
Enforcement:	[Information Needed]
Limitations:	One year from the completion of the contract and the acceptance of the public work by the governmental entity (§ 36-91-72, § 36-91-95, § 13-10-65, § 13-10-42)
Notice Requirements:	Contractor shall provide notice within 15 days after commencing work on the project and supply a copy of the notice to any person who makes a written request within ten calendar days of receipt of the written request (§ 36-91-92(a), § 13-10-62(a))
Other:	[Information Needed]

=== Hawaii ===
Hawaii Revised Statutes, Chapter 103D, Hawaii Public Procurement Code, Part III, Source Selection and Contract Formation, Sections 103D-323 through 103D-325

Performance Bond Required:	[Information Needed]
Payment Bond Required:	[Information Needed]
Entitlement to Copy of Bond:	[Information Needed]
Enforcement:	[Information Needed]
Limitations:	[Information Needed]
Notice Requirements:	[Information Needed]
Other:	[Information Needed]

=== Idaho ===
Idaho Code, Title 54, Professions, Vocations and Businesses, Chapter 19, Public Works Contractors, Sections 54-1925 through 54-1930

Performance Bond Required:	[Information Needed]
Payment Bond Required:	[Information Needed]
Entitlement to Copy of Bond:	[Information Needed]
Enforcement:	[Information Needed]
Limitations:	[Information Needed]
Notice Requirements:	[Information Needed]
Other:	[Information Needed]

=== Illinois ===
Illinois Compiled Statutes, Government, Chapter 30, Finance – Purchases and Contracts, Sections 550/0.01 through 550/3, Public Construction Bond Act

Performance Bond Required:	Contract amount more than $50,000.00 on state projects and more than $5,000.00 on state subdivision projects, bond amount set by government (Sec. 550/1)
Payment Bond Required:	Contract amount more than $50,000.00 on state projects and more than $5,000.00 on state subdivision projects, bond amount set by government (Sec. 550/1)
Entitlement to Copy of Bond:	Not specified
Enforcement:	Suit after 120 days from last work or final settlement (Sec. 550/2)
Limitations:	Suit filed within 6 months of final acceptance of project (Sec. 550/2)
Notice Requirements:	Notice to government within 180 days of last work, plus 10-day notice thereafter to contractor (Sec. 550/2)
Other:	Terms of bond presumed by statute (Sec. 550/1); Venue only in county were project to be performed (Sec. 550/2)

=== Indiana ===
Indiana Code, Title 4, State Offices and Administration, Article 13.6, State Public Works, Chapter 7, Bonding, Escrow and Retainages, sections 4-13.6-7-5 through 4-13.6-7-12; Title 5, State and Local Administration, Article 16, Public Works, Chapter 5, Withholding and Bond to Secure Payment of Subcontractors, Labor and Materialmen; Chapter 5.5, Retainage, Bonds, and Payment of Contractors and Subcontractors, sections 5-16-5.5-1 through 5-16-5.5-8

Performance Bond Required:	[Information Needed]
Payment Bond Required:	[Information Needed]
Entitlement to Copy of Bond:	[Information Needed]
Enforcement:	[Information Needed]
Limitations:	[Information Needed]
Notice Requirements:	[Information Needed]
Other:	[Information Needed]

=== Iowa ===
Iowa Code, Title XIV, Property, Subtitle 3, Liens, Chapter 573, Labor and Material on Public Improvements, sections 573.1 through 573.227; See also, Iowa Code, Title XV, Judicial Branch and Judicial Procedures, Subtitle 3, Judicial Procedure, Chapter 616, Place of Bringing Actions, section 616.15, Surety Companies

Performance Bond Required:	[Information Needed]
Payment Bond Required:	[Information Needed]
Entitlement to Copy of Bond:	[Information Needed]
Enforcement:	[Information Needed]
Limitations:	[Information Needed]
Notice Requirements:	[Information Needed]
Other:	[Information Needed]

=== Kansas ===
Kansas Statutes, Chapter 16, Contracts and Promises, Article 19, Kansas Fairness in Public Construction Contract Act, sections 16-1901 through 16-1908; Chapter 60, Civil Procedure, Article 11, Liens for Labor and Material, sections 60-1110 & 60-1112; Chapter 68, Roads and Bridges, Part I, Roads, Article 5, County and Township Roads, sections 68-410, 68-521 and 68-527a

Performance Bond Required:	[Information Needed]
Payment Bond Required:	[Information Needed]
Entitlement to Copy of Bond:	[Information Needed]
Enforcement:	[Information Needed]
Limitations:	[Information Needed]
Notice Requirements:	[Information Needed]
Other:	[Information Needed]

=== Kentucky ===
Kentucky Revised Statutes, Chapter 45A, Kentucky Model Procurement Code, sections 45A.185, 45A.190, 45A.195, 45A.225 through 45A.265, and 45A.430 through 45A.440; See also, Kentucky Revised Statutes, Title XXVII, Chapter 341, Unemployment Compensation, section 341.317

Performance Bond Required:	[Information Needed]
Payment Bond Required:	[Information Needed]
Entitlement to Copy of Bond:	[Information Needed]
Enforcement:	[Information Needed]
Limitations:	[Information Needed]
Notice Requirements:	[Information Needed]
Other:	[Information Needed]

=== Louisiana ===
Louisiana Revised Statutes, Title 38, Public Contracts, Works and Improvements, Chapter 10, Public Contracts, sections 38:2181 – 38:2247; Title 48, Roads, Bridges and Ferries, Chapter 1, Department of Transportation and Development, sections 48:250 – 48:256.12

Performance Bond Required:	[Information Needed]
Payment Bond Required:	[Information Needed]
Entitlement to Copy of Bond:	[Information Needed]
Enforcement:	[Information Needed]
Limitations:	[Information Needed]
Notice Requirements:	[Information Needed]
Other:	[Information Needed]

=== Maine ===
Maine Revised Statutes, Title 14, Court Procedure – Civil, Part 2, Proceedings Before Trial, Chapter 205, Limitation of Actions, Subchapter 3, Miscellaneous Actions, Section 871: Public Works Contractors' Surety Bond Law of 1971

Performance Bond Required:	[Information Needed]
Payment Bond Required:	[Information Needed]
Entitlement to Copy of Bond:	[Information Needed]
Enforcement:	[Information Needed]
Limitations:	[Information Needed]
Notice Requirements:	[Information Needed]
Other:	[Information Needed]

=== Maryland ===
Maryland Code, State Finance and Procurement Law, Division II, General Procurement Law, Title 17, Special Provisions – State and Local Subdivisions, Subtitle 1, Security for Construction Contracts, Sections 101 through 111

Performance Bond Required:	Contracts exceeding $100,000.00
Payment Bond Required:	Contracts exceeding $100,000.00, in 1/2 contract amount (§17-103(a)(2)(ii))
Entitlement to Copy of Bond:	[Information Needed]
Enforcement:	[Information Needed]
Limitations:	[Information Needed]
Notice Requirements:	[Information Needed]
Other:	Bonds required by public entities other than states and state subdivisions (§17-103(b)); Contractor certification of payment required for final payment (§17–106)

=== Massachusetts ===
Massachusetts General Laws, Part I, Administration of the Government, Title XXI, Labor and Industries, Chapter 149, Labor and Industries, Section 29

Performance Bond Required:	[Information Needed]
Payment Bond Required:	[Information Needed]
Entitlement to Copy of Bond:	[Information Needed]
Enforcement:	[Information Needed]
Limitations:	[Information Needed]
Notice Requirements:	[Information Needed]
Other:	[Information Needed]

=== Michigan ===
Michigan Compiled Laws Annotated §§ 129.201–129.212 and §§ 570.101–570.101 (2008); Chapter 129, Public Funds, Act 213 of 1963 (as amended), Contractor's Bond for Public Buildings or Works; Chapter 570, Liens, Act 187 of 1905 (as amended), Public Buildings and Public Works; Bond of Contractor

Performance Bond Required:	[Information Needed]
Payment Bond Required:	[Information Needed]
Entitlement to Copy of Bond:	[Information Needed]
Enforcement:	[Information Needed]
Limitations:	[Information Needed]
Notice Requirements:	[Information Needed]
Other:	[Information Needed]

=== Minnesota ===
Minnesota Statutes, Chapter 574, Bonds, Fines, Forfeitures, Sections 26 through 32

Performance Bond Required:	[Information Needed]
Payment Bond Required:	[Information Needed]
Entitlement to Copy of Bond:	[Information Needed]
Enforcement:	[Information Needed]
Limitations:	[Information Needed]
Notice Requirements:	[Information Needed]
Other:	[Information Needed]

=== Mississippi ===
Mississippi Code, Title 31, Public Business, Bonds and Obligations, Chapter 5, Public Works Contracts, Sections 31-5-51 through 31-5-57, Bonds Securing Public Works Contracts; See also, Miss. Code §§ 31-5-25 through 31-5-31 (prompt payment provisions)

Performance Bond Required:	[Information Needed]
Payment Bond Required:	[Information Needed]
Entitlement to Copy of Bond:	[Information Needed]
Enforcement:	[Information Needed]
Limitations:	[Information Needed]
Notice Requirements:	[Information Needed]
Other:	[Information Needed]

=== Missouri ===
Missouri Revised Statutes, Title VIII, Chapter 107, Section 107.170; Title XIV, Chapter 227, Sections 227.100, 227.600 and 227.633; Chapter 229, Sections 229.050, 229.060 and 229.070; Title XXXVI, Chapter 522, Section 522.300

Performance Bond Required:	[Information Needed]
Payment Bond Required:	[Information Needed]
Entitlement to Copy of Bond:	[Information Needed]
Enforcement:	[Information Needed]
Limitations:	[Information Needed]
Notice Requirements:	[Information Needed]
Other:	[Information Needed]

=== Montana ===
Montana Code Annotated, Title 18, Public Contracts, Chapter 2, Construction Contracts, Part 2, Performance, Labor and Materials Bond, Sections 18-2-201through 18-2-208

Performance Bond Required:	[Information Needed]
Payment Bond Required:	[Information Needed]
Entitlement to Copy of Bond:	[Information Needed]
Enforcement:	[Information Needed]
Limitations:	[Information Needed]
Notice Requirements:	[Information Needed]
Other:	[Information Needed]

=== Nebraska ===
Nebraska Revised Statutes, Chapter 52, Liens, Sections 52-118 through 52-118.02

Performance Bond Required:	[Information Needed]
Payment Bond Required:	[Information Needed]
Entitlement to Copy of Bond:	[Information Needed]
Enforcement:	[Information Needed]
Limitations:	[Information Needed]
Notice Requirements:	[Information Needed]
Other:	[Information Needed]

=== Nevada ===
Nevada Revised Statutes, Title 28, Public Works and Planning, Chapter 339, Contractors' Bonds on Public Works, Sections 339.015 through 339.065

Performance Bond Required:	[Information Needed]
Payment Bond Required:	[Information Needed]
Entitlement to Copy of Bond:	[Information Needed]
Enforcement:	[Information Needed]
Limitations:	[Information Needed]
Notice Requirements:	[Information Needed]
Other:	[Information Needed]

=== New Hampshire ===
New Hampshire Revised Statutes, Title XLI, Liens, Chapter 447, Liens for Labor and Materials; Public Works, Sections 447:15 through 447:18

Performance Bond Required:	[Information Needed]
Payment Bond Required:	[Information Needed]
Entitlement to Copy of Bond:	[Information Needed]
Enforcement:	[Information Needed]
Limitations:	[Information Needed]
Notice Requirements:	[Information Needed]
Other:	[Information Needed]

=== New Jersey ===
New Jersey Revised Statutes, Title 2A, Administration of Civil and Criminal Justice, Chapter 44, Sections 2A:44-143 through 2A:44-148

Performance Bond Required:	[Information Needed]
Payment Bond Required:	[Information Needed]
Entitlement to Copy of Bond:	[Information Needed]
Enforcement:	[Information Needed]
Limitations:	[Information Needed]
Notice Requirements:	[Information Needed]
Other:	[Information Needed]

=== New Mexico ===
New Mexico Statutes, Chapter 13, Public Purchases and Property, Article 4, Public Works Contracts, Sections 13-4-18 through 13-4-20

Performance Bond Required:	[Information Needed]
Payment Bond Required:	[Information Needed]
Entitlement to Copy of Bond:	[Information Needed]
Enforcement:	[Information Needed]
Limitations:	[Information Needed]
Notice Requirements:	[Information Needed]
Other:	[Information Needed]

=== New York ===
New York Consolidated Laws, State Finance Law, Article 9, Contracts, §137

Performance Bond Required:	[Information Needed]
Payment Bond Required:	(§137.1)
Entitlement to Copy of Bond:	(§137.2)
Enforcement:	Suit after 90 days from last work (§137.3)
Limitations:	One year from date on which the public improvement has been completed and accepted by the public owner (§137.4(b))
Notice Requirements:	Second tier subcontractors - 120 days from last work (§137.3)
Other:	Interest and attorney's fees (§137.4(c)); Includes rental (§137.5(a))

=== North Carolina ===
North Carolina General Statutes, Chapter 44A, Statutory Liens and Charges, Article 3, Model Payment and Performance Bond, Sections 44A-25 through 44A-35

Performance Bond Required:	[Information Needed]
Payment Bond Required:	[Information Needed]
Entitlement to Copy of Bond:	[Information Needed]
Enforcement:	[Information Needed]
Limitations:	[Information Needed]
Notice Requirements:	[Information Needed]
Other:	[Information Needed]

=== North Dakota ===
North Dakota Century Code, Title 48, Public Buildings, Chapter 48-01.2, Public Improvement Bids and Contract, Sections 48-01.2-01, 48-01.2-09 through 48-01.2-12 and 48-01.2-23

Performance Bond Required:	Projects of $100,000 or more
Payment Bond Required:	[Information Needed]
Entitlement to Copy of Bond:	[Information Needed]
Enforcement:	[Information Needed]
Limitations:	[Information Needed]
Notice Requirements:	[Information Needed]
Other:	[Information Needed]

=== Ohio ===
Ohio Revised Code, Title I, State Government, Chapter 153, Public Improvements, Sections 153.54 through 153.581

Performance Bond Required:	[Information Needed]
Payment Bond Required:	[Information Needed]
Entitlement to Copy of Bond:	[Information Needed]
Enforcement:	[Information Needed]
Limitations:	[Information Needed]
Notice Requirements:	[Information Needed]
Other:	[Information Needed]

=== Oklahoma ===
Oklahoma Statutes, Title 61, Public Buildings and Public Works, Sections 61-1, 61-2, 61-13 and 61-15; Title 61, Public Competitive Bidding Act of 1974 (as amended), Section 61-112

Performance Bond Required:	[Information Needed]
Payment Bond Required:	[Information Needed]
Entitlement to Copy of Bond:	[Information Needed]
Enforcement:	[Information Needed]
Limitations:	[Information Needed]
Notice Requirements:	[Information Needed]
Other:	[Information Needed]

=== Oregon ===
Oregon Revised Statutes, Title 26, Public Facilities, Contracting and Insurance, Chapter 279C, Public Contracting – Public Improvements and Related Contracts, Sections 279C.380 through 279C.390, 279C.515, and 279C.600 through 279C.625

Performance Bond Required:	[Information Needed]
Payment Bond Required:	[Information Needed]
Entitlement to Copy of Bond:	[Information Needed]
Enforcement:	[Information Needed]
Limitations:	[Information Needed]
Notice Requirements:	[Information Needed]
Other:	[Information Needed]

=== Pennsylvania ===
Pennsylvania Statutes, Title 8, Bonds and Recognizances, Chapter 13, Public Works Contractors' Bonds, Sections 191 through 202

Performance Bond Required:	[Information Needed]
Payment Bond Required:	[Information Needed]
Entitlement to Copy of Bond:	[Information Needed]
Enforcement:	[Information Needed]
Limitations:	[Information Needed]
Notice Requirements:	[Information Needed]
Other:	[Information Needed]

=== Rhode Island ===
Rhode Island General Laws, Title 37, Public Property and Works, Chapter 37-12, Contractors' Bond, Sections 37-12-1 through 37-12-11

Performance Bond Required:	[Information Needed]
Payment Bond Required:	[Information Needed]
Entitlement to Copy of Bond:	[Information Needed]
Enforcement:	[Information Needed]
Limitations:	[Information Needed]
Notice Requirements:	[Information Needed]
Other:	[Information Needed]

=== South Carolina ===
S.C. Code, Title 11, Public Finance, Chapter 35, South Carolina Consolidated Procurement Code, Article 9, Construction, Architect-Engineer, Construction Management, and Land Surveying Services, Subarticle 3, Construction Services, Section 11-35-3030

Performance Bond Required:	[Information Needed]
Payment Bond Required:	[Information Needed]
Entitlement to Copy of Bond:	[Information Needed]
Enforcement:	[Information Needed]
Limitations:	[Information Needed]
Notice Requirements:	[Information Needed]
Other:	[Information Needed]

=== South Dakota ===
South Dakota Codified Laws, Title 5, Public Property, Purchases and Contracts, Chapter 21, Performance Bonds for Public Improvement Contracts, Sections 5-21-1 through 5-21-8

Performance Bond Required:	[Information Needed]
Payment Bond Required:	[Information Needed]
Entitlement to Copy of Bond:	[Information Needed]
Enforcement:	[Information Needed]
Limitations:	[Information Needed]
Notice Requirements:	[Information Needed]
Other:	[Information Needed]

=== Tennessee ===
Tenn. Code, Title 12, Public Property, Printing and Contracts, Chapter 4, Public Contracts, Part 2 – Surety Bonds, Sections 12-4-201 through 12-4-206

Performance Bond Required:	[Information Needed]
Payment Bond Required:	[Information Needed]
Entitlement to Copy of Bond:	[Information Needed]
Enforcement:	[Information Needed]
Limitations:	[Information Needed]
Notice Requirements:	[Information Needed]
Other:	[Information Needed]

=== Texas ===
Texas Government Code, Title 10, General Government, Subtitle F, State and Local Contracts and Fund Management, Chapter 2253, Sections 2253.001 through 2253.076; Texas Property Code, Title 5, Exempt Property and Liens, Subtitle B, Liens, Chapter 53, Mechanic's, Contractor's or Materialman's Lien, Subchapter J, Lien or Money Due Public Works Contractor, Sections 53.231 through 53.237

Performance Bond Required:	[Information Needed]
Payment Bond Required:	[Information Needed]
Entitlement to Copy of Bond:	[Information Needed]
Enforcement:	[Information Needed]
Limitations:	[Information Needed]
Notice Requirements:	[Information Needed]
Other:	[Information Needed]

=== Utah ===
Utah Code, Title 14, Contractors' Bonds, Chapter 1, Public Contracts, Sections 14-1-18 through 14-1-20; Title 38, Liens, Chapter 1, Mechanics' Liens, Section 38-1-32; Title 63G, General Government, Chapter 6, Utah Procurement Code, Sections 63G-6-504 through 63G-6-507

Performance Bond Required:	[Information Needed]
Payment Bond Required:	[Information Needed]
Entitlement to Copy of Bond:	[Information Needed]
Enforcement:	[Information Needed]
Limitations:	[Information Needed]
Notice Requirements:	[Information Needed]
Other:	[Information Needed]

=== Vermont ===
Vermont Statutes, Title 19, Highways, Chapter 1, State Highway Law, Section 10, Duties; See also, Title 16, Education, Chapter 123, State Aid for Capital Construction Costs, § 3448

Performance Bond Required:	[Information Needed]
Payment Bond Required:	[Information Needed]
Entitlement to Copy of Bond:	[Information Needed]
Enforcement:	[Information Needed]
Limitations:	[Information Needed]
Notice Requirements:	[Information Needed]
Other:	[Information Needed]

=== Virginia ===
Virginia Code, Title 2.2, Administration of Government, Chapter 43, Virginia Public Procurement Act, Sections 2.2-4336 through 2.2-4342

Performance Bond Required:	§ 2.2-4337. Bond waived for Pre-Qualified Contractors for contracts over $100,000.00 up to corresponding limits. 100% Payment & Performance Bond, certified funds, or cash escrow required for Non-Transportation related contracts exceeding $500,000.00. Transportation related contracts exceeding $250,000.00.
Payment Bond Required:	§ 2.2-4337. Bond waived for Pre-Qualified Contractors for contracts over $100,000.00 up to corresponding limits. 100% Payment & Performance Bond, certified funds, or cash escrow required for Non-Transportation related contracts exceeding $500,000.00. Transportation related contracts exceeding $250,000.00.
Entitlement to Copy of Bond:	YES under Virginia Freedom of Information Act (§ 2.2-3700 et seq.)
Enforcement:	Litigation after expiration of 90 days from last date work performed or materials furnished not more than 1 year from last date work performed or material furnished
Limitations:	Not before 90 days nor after 1 year
Notice Requirements:	Second-tier contractors must provide notice within 90 days of the last day work is performed on the project for which it seeks payment
Other:	[Information Needed]

=== Virgin Islands (U.S.) ===
[Information Needed]

=== Washington ===
Washington Revised Code, Title 39, Public Contracts and Indebtedness, Chapter 39.08, Contractor's Bond, Sections 39.08.010 through 39.08.100

Performance Bond Required:	Performance bond required if project exceeds $35,000. RCW 39.08.010 The bond amount must be in the amount of the contract price between public body and prime contractor. RCW 39.08.030
Payment Bond Required:	Payment bond required if project exceeds $35,000. RCW 39.08.010. The bond amount must be in the amount of the contract price between public body and prime contractor. RCW 39.08.030
Entitlement to Copy of Bond:	No restrictions
Enforcement:	Claim on bond must be filed with public body no later than 30 days "from and after the completion of the contract with an acceptance of the work by the" public body. RCW 39.08.030. No time limit to file suit to enforce bond claim, other than 6-year statute of limitations for written contracts.
Limitations:	[Information Needed]
Notice Requirements:	No notice required for subcontractors and suppliers who contract directly with prime contractor. Otherwise, notice must be sent certified mail to the prime contractor no later than 10 days after first delivery of materials or equipment. RCW 39.08.065. No notice required for labor portion of claim.
Other:	Washington law also permits subcontractors, suppliers, and equipment renters to file a claim on the 5% retainage held by the public body. RCW 60.28. Notice can be sent any time, but covers only materials and equipment furnished in the 60 days preceding the date notice is given to the prime contractor certified mail. RCW 60.28.015. Claim on retainge must be filed with the public body "within 45 days of completion of the contract work". RCW 60.28.011. Lawsuit to foreclose retainage claim must be filed within 4 months after claim is filed with public body. RCW 60.28.030.

=== West Virginia ===
West Virginia Code, Chapter 5, General Powers and Authority of the Governor, Secretary of State and Attorney General; Board of Public Works; Miscellaneous Agencies, Commissions, Offices, Programs, Etc., Article 22, Government Construction Contracts, Sections 5-22-1 and 5-22-2; Chapter 38, Liens, Article 22, Mechanics' Liens, Section 38-2-39

Performance Bond Required:	[Information Needed]
Payment Bond Required:	[Information Needed]
Entitlement to Copy of Bond:	[Information Needed]
Enforcement:	[Information Needed]
Limitations:	[Information Needed]
Notice Requirements:	[Information Needed]
Other:	[Information Needed]

=== Wisconsin ===
Wisconsin Statutes, Chapter 779, Liens, Subchapter I, Construction Liens, Sections 14 and 15

Performance Bond Required:	[Information Needed]
Payment Bond Required:	[Information Needed]
Entitlement to Copy of Bond:	[Information Needed]
Enforcement:	[Information Needed]
Limitations:	[Information Needed]
Notice Requirements:	[Information Needed]
Other:	[Information Needed]

=== Wyoming ===
Wyoming Statutes, Title 16, City, County, State and Local Powers, Chapter 6, Public Property, Article 1, Public Works and Contracts, Sections 16-6-101 through 16-6-121

Performance Bond Required:	[Information Needed]
Payment Bond Required:	[Information Needed]
Entitlement to Copy of Bond:	[Information Needed]
Enforcement:	[Information Needed]
Limitations:	[Information Needed]
Notice Requirements:	[Information Needed]
Other:	[Information Needed]
