= Construction law =

Laws about building, engineering, etc

Construction law is a branch of law that deals with matters relating to building construction, engineering, and related fields. It is in essence an amalgam of contract law, commercial law, planning law, employment law and tort. Construction law covers a wide range of legal issues including contract, negligence, bonds and bonding, guarantees and sureties, liens and other security interests, tendering, construction claims, and related consultancy contracts. Construction law affects many participants in the construction industry, including financial institutions, surveyors, quantity surveyors, architects, carpenters, engineers, construction workers, and planners.

== Specific practice areas ==
Construction law builds upon general legal principles and methodologies and incorporates the regulatory framework (including security of payment, planning, environmental and building regulations); contract methodologies and selection (including traditional and alternative forms of contracting); subcontract issues; causes of action, and liability, arising in contract, negligence and on other grounds; insurance and performance security; dispute resolution and avoidance.

Construction law has evolved into a practice discipline in its own right, distinct from its traditional locations as a subpractice of project finance, real estate or corporate law. There are often strong links between construction law and energy law and oil and gas law.

Some of the major areas a construction lawyer covers are:

- Alternative Dispute Resolution
  - Arbitration
  - Dispute review boards (or other third party reviews)
  - Mediation
  - Structured negotiations
- Bankruptcy issues for contractors, owners, suppliers, etc.
- Bidding (tendering) disputes
- Building and other permits
- Building information modeling
- Contract law
  - Change Orders (Variations)
  - Construction claims
  - Construction liens
  - Wage requirements (Davis-Bacon Act of 1931, etc.)
  - Payment and Prompt payments acts
  - Extensions of time
  - Drafting construction contracts
  - Industry-standard construction contracts
  - Negotiating construction contracts
  - Negotiating a termination claim, whether for convenience or for default
- Defective design or construction
- Delays and acceleration
- Employment Law including Immigration
- Environmental matters in construction
- False Claims Act(s)
- Fire codes and regulations
- Fulfilling regulations for non-discrimination or other social impact legislation
- Insurances issues
  - Damage, liability
  - Indemnification
  - Surety Law (Payment and Performance Bonds)
- Labor issues and strikes
- Licensing construction professionals
- OSHA, and other federal agencies
- Overinspection
- Project delivery systems, such as design-bid-build, Design-Build, Construction Manager (CM) at Risk or Agency CM
- Provide defense to businesses facing administrative actions such as delisting (loss of bid listing)
- Provide legal counsel
- Public construction
  - Federal construction under FAR or other regulated procurements
  - State contracting procedures
- State and local building codes
- Sustainable construction, e.g. LEED
- Litigation: trying construction cases in court
- Violations, safety or other regulatory

== Construction contracts ==
Although no special contract formalities are required, it is normal practice to use standard-form contracts such as, in the UK, the Joint Contracts Tribunal (JCT) form. In order to expedite dispute resolution, standard forms have often provided for arbitration by a "board of arbitration" or professional arbitrator, although many now offer a choice between arbitration and litigation. Construction law has been affected by the requirements in public contracts, which include surety bonds and other procedures. In private contracts, the requirements are negotiated between the parties. As of 1998, the principles of construction law were "well established". Remedies for breach of contract are the same as in the ordinary law, and include damages, repudiation, rescission, and specific performance.

== Country-specific contract practice ==
=== Australia ===
The standard form construction contracts used in Australia include the Australian Building Industry Contracts (ABIC), the Standards Australia contracts, the Australian Defence Contracting Suite of Tendering and Contracting (AUSDEFCON) and the GC21 government contracts form.

=== Canada ===
In Canada, the law requires money for work done to be paid in trust.

=== South Africa ===
The standard form construction contracts in use in South Africa include FIDIC, the New Engineering Contract (NEC), the General Conditions of Contract for Construction Works (GCC) and Joint Building Contracts Committee (JBCC) agreements.

=== United Kingdom ===
The JCT works on the most popular type of standard construction contracts and the latest suite of contracts from the JCT are the 2024 editions. The form of contract most favoured by public bodies is the NEC contract suite.

In the UK, specific requirements relating to payments and adjudication provisions were introduced by the Housing Grants, Construction and Regeneration Act 1996, and were subsequently amended in Part 8 of the Local Democracy, Economic Development and Construction Act 2009. These requirements are generally known as the Construction Act requirements. The requirements set out certain minimum provisions which must be included in any construction contract (as defined within the Act) and failure to comply with these requirements will cause the relevant provisions to be deleted and compliant provisions to be inserted in their place, which can lead to unexpected consequences for unsuspecting parties to a construction contract.

Although some see construction law as another form of general contract law, it is a very specialised area and most people requiring advice on construction law in the UK would seek advice from construction law specialists.

=== United States ===
Standard form contracts promulgated by the American Institute of Architects have been the standard in the industry (insofar as building construction); the organization first published a form in 1888, and has over 200 forms, with revisions to selected forms happening typically every ten years. However, these forms have been criticized as unfair to contractors in favor of owners and architects, which led to the publication of ConsensusDocs standard contracts in September 2007. The ConsensusDocs Coalition includes 41 trade associations representing design professionals, owners, contractors, subcontractors and sureties in the design and construction industry. ConsensusDocs publishes more than 100 contract documents, addressing all methods of project delivery, and are written in the project's best interest versus one particular party. Engineering lead projects such as horizontal infrastructure use other standard form contracts such as those developed by the Engineers Joint Contract Documents Committee (EJCDC). Recently several other organizations have developed contracts for use such as the CMAA (for projects using agency construction management) and the Design-Build Institute of America for projects using Design–build.

==== Deviation ====
When a plan has been adopted for a building, and in the progress of the work a change is made from the original plan, the change is called a "deviation". When the contract is to build a house according to the original plan, and a deviation takes place, the contract shall be traced as far as possible, and the additions, if any have been made, shall be paid for according to the usual rate of charging.

== Construction law organizations ==
=== United States ===
The Forum on Construction Law of the American Bar Association established in 1973 is the largest organization of construction lawyers in the United States. The group includes law firms of every size, solo practitioners, in-house and government counsel, non-lawyers such as, construction professionals and the public sector representatives. Forum members include those of owners, developers, design professionals, contractors, subcontractors, suppliers, construction managers, lenders, insurers and sureties.

=== United Kingdom and other ===
In the United Kingdom, there has been an active Society of Construction Law since 1983, and there is now a European Society of Construction Law, and Societies of Construction Law in Australia, Hong Kong, Singapore, and the UAE.

== See also ==
- Mechanic's lien
- Construction management
- Planning permission
