= Surety =

Promise to assume responsibility for defaulted debt

In finance, a surety /ˈʃʊərɪti/, surety bond, or guaranty involves a promise by one party to assume responsibility for the debt obligation of a borrower if that borrower defaults. Usually, a surety bond or surety is a promise by a person or company (a surety or guarantor) to pay one party (the obligee) a certain amount if a second party (the principal) fails to meet some obligation, such as fulfilling the terms of a contract. The surety bond protects the obligee against losses resulting from the principal's failure to meet the obligation.

== Overview ==
A surety bond is defined as a contract among at least three parties:

- the obligee: the party who is the recipient of an obligation
- the principal: the primary party who will perform the contractual obligation
- the surety: who assures the obligee that the principal can perform the task

European surety bonds can be issued by banks and surety companies. If issued by banks they are called "Bank Guaranties" in English and Cautions in French, if issued by a surety company they are called surety / bonds. They pay out cash to the limit of guaranty in the event of the default of the Principal to uphold his obligations to the Obligee, without reference by the Obligee to the Principal and against the Obligee's sole verified statement of claim to the bank.

Through a surety bond, the surety agrees to uphold—for the benefit of the obligee—the contractual promises (obligations) made by the principal if the principal fails to uphold its promises to the obligee. The contract is formed so as to induce the obligee to contract with the principal, i.e., to demonstrate the credibility of the principal and guarantee performance and completion per the terms of the agreement.

The principal will pay a premium (usually annually) in exchange for the bonding company's financial strength to extend surety credit. In the event of a claim, the surety will investigate it. If it turns out to be a valid claim, the surety will pay and then turn to the principal for reimbursement of the amount paid on the claim and any legal fees incurred. In some cases, the principal has a cause of action against another party for the principal's loss, and the surety will have a right of subrogation to "step into the shoes of" the principal and recover damages to make up for the payment to the principal.

If the principal defaults and the surety turns out to be insolvent, the assurance is rendered worthless. Thus, the surety on a bond is usually an insurance company whose solvency is verified by private audit, governmental regulation, or both.

A key term in nearly every surety bond is the penal sum. This is a specified amount of money which is the maximum amount that the surety will be required to pay in the event of the principal's default. This allows the surety to assess the risk involved in giving the bond; the premium charged is determined accordingly.

Surety bonds also occur in other situations, for example, to secure the proper performance of fiduciary duties by persons in positions of private or public trust.

== History ==
Individual surety bonds represent the original form of suretyship. The earliest known record of a contract of suretyship is a Mesopotamian tablet written around 2750 BC. Evidence of individual surety bonds exists in the Code of Hammurabi and in Babylon, Persia, Assyria, Rome, Carthage, among the ancient Hebrews, and (later) in England. The Code of Hammurabi, written around 1790 BC, provides the earliest surviving known mention of suretyship in a written legal code.

Suretyship was not always accomplished through the execution of a bond. Frankpledge, for example, was a system of joint suretyship prevalent in medieval England which did not rely upon the execution of bonds.

The first corporate surety, the Guarantee Society of London (whose insurance business ultimately merged into Aviva), dates from 1840.

In 1865, the Fidelity Insurance Company became the first US corporate surety company, but the venture soon failed.

In 1894 the US Congress passed the Heard Act, which required surety bonds on all federally funded projects. The US Supreme Court held in 1896, in Prairie State Bank v. United States, that an equitable claim by a surety to percentages of payment retained by the US government had priority over the claim of an assignee/lender.

In 1908 the Surety Association of America, now the Surety & Fidelity Association of America (SFAA), was formed to regulate the industry, promote public understanding of and confidence in the surety industry, and to provide a forum for the discussion of problems of common interest to its members. SFAA is a licensed rating or advisory organization in all states and is designated by state insurance departments as a statistical agent for the reporting of fidelity and surety experience. The SFAA is a trade association consisting of companies that collectively write the majority of surety and fidelity bonds in the United States. Then in 1935 the Miller Act was passed, replacing the Heard Act. The Miller Act is the current federal law mandating the use of surety bonds on federally funded projects.

== Reason for having a guarantor ==
A surety most typically requires a guarantor when the ability of the primary obligor, or principal, to perform its obligations to the obligee (counterparty) under a contract is in question or when there is some public or private interest that requires protection from the consequences of the principal's default or delinquency. In most common law jurisdictions, a contract of suretyship is subject to the Statute of Frauds (or its equivalent local laws) and is unenforceable unless it is recorded in writing and signed by the surety and by the principal.

== United States industry ==
The SFAA published preliminary US and Canadian H1 surety results for the 2022 calendar year. Direct written premium totaled $8.6 billion and a direct loss ratio of 14.5%, highlighting strong profitability in the surety industry. The industry remains highly fragmented with over 100 companies directly writing surety bonds with new market entrants entering or reentering on a fairly common basis.

As of 2009 annual US surety bond premiums amounted to approximately $3.5 billion. State insurance commissioners are responsible for regulating corporate surety activities within their jurisdictions. The commissioners also license and regulate brokers or agents who sell the bonds. These are known as producers; the National Association of Surety Bond Producers (NASBP) is a trade association which represents this group.

=== Miller Act ===
The Miller Act may require a surety bond for contractors on certain federal construction projects; in addition, many states have adopted their own "Little Miller Acts". The surety transaction will typically involve a producer; the National Association of Surety Bond Producers (NASBP) is a trade association that represents such producers.

== Right of subrogation ==
If the surety is required to pay or perform due to the principal's failure to do so, the law will usually give the surety a right of subrogation, allowing the surety to "step into the shoes of" the principal and use the surety's contractual rights to recover the cost of making payment or performing on the principal's behalf, even in the absence of an express agreement to that effect between the surety and the principal.

== Distinction between a suretyship arrangement and a guaranty ==
Traditionally, a distinction was made between a suretyship arrangement and that of a guaranty. In both cases, the lender gained the ability to collect from another person in the event of a default by the principal. However, the surety's liability was joint and primary with the principal: the creditor could attempt to collect the debt from either party independently of the other. The guarantor's liability was ancillary and derivative: the creditor first had to attempt to collect the debt from the debtor before looking to the guarantor for payment. Many jurisdictions have abolished that distinction, in effect putting all guarantors in the position of the surety.

== Contract surety bonds ==
Contract bonds, used heavily in the construction industry by general contractors as a part of construction law, are a guaranty from a surety to a project's owner (obligee) that a general contractor (principal) will adhere to the provisions of a contract. The Associated General Contractors of America, a United States trade association, provides some information for their members on these bonds. Contract bonds are not the same thing as contractor's license bonds, which may be required as part of a license.

Included in this category are bid bonds (guaranty that a contractor will enter into a contract if awarded the bid); performance bonds (guaranty that a contractor will perform the work as specified by the contract); payment bonds (guaranty that a contractor will pay for services, particularly subcontractors and materials and particularly for federal projects where a mechanic's lien is not available); and maintenance bonds (guaranty that a contractor will provide facility repair and upkeep for a specified period of time). There are also miscellaneous contract bonds that do not fall within the categories above, the most common of which are subdivision and supply bonds. Bonds are typically required for federal government projects by the Miller Act and state projects under "little Miller Acts". In federal government, the contract language is determined by the government. In private contracts the parties may freely contract the language and requirements. Standard form contracts provided by the American Institute of Architects (AIA) and the Associated General Contractors of America (AGC) make bonding optional. If the parties agree to require bonding, additional forms such as the performance bond contract AIA Document 311 provide common terms.

Losses arise when contractors do not complete their contracts, which often arises when the contractor goes out of business. Contractors often go out of business; for example, a study by BizMiner found that of 853,372 contracts in the United States in 2002, 28.5% had exited business by 2004. The average failure rate of contractors in the United States from 1989 to 2002 was 14% versus 12% for other industries.

Prices are as a percentage of the penal sum (the maximum that the surety is liable for) ranging from around 1% to 5%, with the most credit-worthy contracts paying the least. The bond typically includes an indemnity agreement whereby the principal contractor or others agree to indemnify the surety if there is a loss. In the United States, the Small Business Administration may guaranty surety bonds; in 2013 the eligible contract tripled to $6.5 million.

== Commercial surety bonds ==
Commercial bonds represent the broad range of bond types that do not fit the classification of contract. They are generally divided into four sub-types: license and permit, court, public official, and miscellaneous.

=== License and permit bonds ===
License and permit bonds are required by certain federal, state, or municipal governments as prerequisites to receiving a license or permit to engage in certain business activities. These bonds function as a guaranty from a Surety to a government and its constituents (obligee) that a company (principal) will comply with an underlying statute, state law, municipal ordinance, or regulation.

Specific examples include:

- Contractor's license bonds, which assure that a contractor (such as a plumber, electrician, or general contractor) complies with laws relating to his field. In the United States, bonding requirements may be at federal, state, or local level.
- Customs bonds, including importer entry bonds, which assure compliance with all relevant laws, as well as payment of import duties and taxes.
- Tax bonds, which assure that a business owner will comply with laws relating to the remittance of sales or other taxes.
- Reclamation and environmental protection bonds
- Broker's bonds, including insurance, mortgage, and title agency bonds
- ERISA (Employee Retirement Income Security Act) bonds
- Motor vehicle dealer bonds
- Freight broker bonds
- Money transmitter bonds
- Health spa bonds, which assure that a health spa will comply with local laws relating to their field, as well as refund dues for any prepaid services in the event the spa closes.

=== Court bonds ===
Court bonds are those bonds prescribed by statute and relate to the courts. They are further broken down into judicial bonds and fiduciary bonds. Judicial bonds arise out of litigation and are posted by parties seeking court remedies or defending against legal actions seeking court remedies. Fiduciary, or probate, bonds are filed in probate courts and courts that exercise equitable jurisdiction; they guaranty that persons whom such courts have entrusted with the care of others' property will perform their specified duties faithfully.

Examples of judicial bonds include appeal bonds, supersedeas bonds, attachment bonds, replevin bonds, injunction bonds, mechanic's lien bonds, and bail bonds. Examples of fiduciary bonds include administrator, guardian, and trustee bonds.

=== Public official bonds ===
Public official bonds guarantee the honesty and faithful performance of those people who are elected or appointed to positions of public trust. Examples of officials sometimes requiring bonds include: notaries public, treasurers, commissioners, judges, town clerks, law enforcement officers, and credit union volunteers.

=== Miscellaneous bonds ===
Miscellaneous bonds are those that do not fit well under the other commercial surety bond classifications. They often support private relationships and unique business needs. Examples of significant miscellaneous bonds include: lost securities bonds, hazardous waste removal bonds, credit enhancement financial guaranty bonds, self–insured workers compensation guaranty bonds, and wage and welfare/fringe benefit (trade union) bonds.

== Business service bonds ==
Business service bonds are surety bonds which seek to safeguard a bonded entity's clients from theft. These bonds are common for home health care, janitorial service, and other companies who routinely enter their homes or businesses. While these bonds are often confused with fidelity bonds, they are much different. A business service bond allows the bonded entity's client to claim on the surety bond when the client's property has been stolen by the bonded entity. However, the claim is only valid if the bonded entity's employee is convicted of the crime in a court of law. Additionally, if the surety company pays a claim on the bond, they would seek to be reimbursed by the bonded entity for all costs and expenses incurred as a result of the claim. This differs from a traditional fidelity bond where the insured (bonded entity) would be responsible for paying the deductible only in the case of covered claim up to the policy limit.

== Penal bonds ==
The penal bond is another type of the bond that was historically used to assure the performance of a contract. They are to be distinguished from surety bonds in that they did not require any party to act as surety—having an obligee and obligor sufficed. One historically significant type of penal bond, the penal bond with conditional defeasance, printed the bond (the obligation to pay) on the front of the document and the condition which would nullify that promise to pay (referred to as the indenture of defeasance—essentially, the contractual obligation) on the back of the document. The penal bond, although an artifact of historical interest, fell out of use by the early part of the nineteenth century in the United States.

== Electronic surety bonds ==
In certain situations, an electronic surety bond (ESB) can be used in lieu of a traditional paper surety bond. In 2016, the Nationwide Multistate Licensing System and Registry (NMLS) initiated a system for the issuance, tracking, and maintenance of ESBs in support of some licenses being managed through the NMLS. This new online system speeds bond issuance and decreases paperwork, among other potential benefits.

=== Timeline ===
The NMLS ESB initiative began on January 25, 2016, when surety bond companies and providers were able to begin the account creation process. The second phase began on September 12, 2016, when an initial group of nine state regulatory agencies began accepting ESBs for certain license types. This initial rollout included agencies in Idaho, Indiana, Iowa, Massachusetts, Texas, Vermont, Washington, Wisconsin, and Wyoming.

On January 23, 2017, another group of twelve state agencies were added to allow ESB capability for certain license types. This group included agencies in Alaska, Georgia, Illinois, Indiana, Louisiana, Minnesota, Mississippi, Montana, North Carolina, North Dakota, Rhode Island, and South Dakota. Minor upgrades were also completed early in 2017. The types of licenses transitioning to ESBs and the implementation timelines vary by licensing agency. The NMLS plans to roll out additional state agencies and update the system with added functionality over time.

== See also ==
- Co-signing
- Demand guarantee
- Estreat
- Fidelity bond
- Fiduciary
- Guarantee
- Indemnity
- Insurance
- Lien waiver
- Loan guarantee
- Negotiable Instrument
- Penal bond
- Performance bond
- Personal guarantee
- Shop drawing
- Submittals (construction)
- Testator
