= Preliminary Notice =

In Mechanics lien law a Preliminary Notice (also known as a Notice to Owner, Materialmens Notice to Owner, Notice of Furnishing, Contractor/Subcontractors Notice to Owner, and others) is a notice sent by the general contractor, subcontractor, materialmen, equipment lessors or other parties to a construction project not to create a Mechanics lien but rather to establish the right to file a Mechanics lien in the event of nonpayment. The distinction is important. If the Preliminary Notice is sent but the claimant's bill is paid, the Preliminary Notice has no further legal effect. However, if the bill is not paid the claimant may now file a Mechanics lien on the owner's property. Most states do not allow the filing of a Mechanics lien without claimants being able to prove they first sent a Preliminary Notice.

== Preliminary Notice Requirements ==
In the United States, about forty states now require that some form of Preliminary Notice is sent to the owner and/or general contractor of a construction project in order to protect lien rights. In states that require preliminary notices, several variables can affect Preliminary Notice requirements. These factors include contract type (whether the lien claimant is contracted directly with the owner or with a third party such as the general contractor), contract value (some preliminary notices are only required when the contract is above a certain dollar amount), and project type (sometimes specific rules apply to construction on condominiums and other structures with multiple owners).

Some states require that Preliminary Notices contain specific language. This information is generally specified in the lien statute of that state. If the Preliminary Notice does not contain the proper information and wording necessitated by the statute, the notice may be invalid which can result in the forfeiture of lien rights. Most Preliminary Notice forms can be obtained from websites that provide free resources, and a few computer programs exist to handle the process on a nationwide basis.

While some states have no Preliminary Notice requirements at all and others only require Preliminary Notice from certain parties, it is generally beneficial for all parties to send preliminary notice. In addition to protecting lien rights, Preliminary Notices ensure that parties at the top of the payment chain are made aware of who is working for them on a project.

== Deadlines ==
Deadlines to send preliminary notices vary by state. Generally notice is required to be sent within a set number of days from the date that labor or materials were first furnished on a project. Some states (Texas, Louisiana, and Tennessee) require that Preliminary Notice be sent every month that payment is not received. Other states (Nevada and Colorado) require that lien claimants send more than one type of Preliminary Notice.

In certain cases, sending Preliminary Notice late results in the forfeiture of lien rights. However, some states accept late Preliminary Notice. For example, California requires that the California Preliminary 20-Day Notice is sent within 20 days of first furnishing labor and/or materials on a project to fully protect lien rights. If a notice is sent late, it will apply to work done after the date of submission and work done in the 20 days prior to the date of submission, but will not apply to any work done before the 20 days preceding submission.

== How to Send Preliminary Notice ==
Most states specify acceptable mailing methods in their lien statute. For example, the Texas lien statute states: "If notice is sent by registered or certified mail, deposit or mailing of the notice in the United States mail in the form required constitutes compliance with the notice requirement."

Often, states require that Preliminary Notice is sent via registered or certified mail, sometimes with return receipt requested.
