= Bid bond =

A bid bond is issued as part of a supply bidding process by the contractor to the project owner, to provide a guarantee that the winning bidder will undertake the contract under the terms on which they bid.

The bond penalty is subject to full or partial forfeiture if the winning contractor fails to either execute the contract or provide the required performance and/or payment bonds. The bid bond assures and guarantees that, should the bidder be successful, the bidder will execute the contract and provide the required surety bonds.

== Details ==
A bid bond can be in any amount. The contractor or supplier providing the bid bond guarantee is referred to as "The Principal" on the bid bond. The bid bond prequalifies the principal and provides the necessary security to the owner (or general contractor), also known as the “obligee”. This helps prequalify contractors and protects the bid letting by guaranteeing that the principal will enter into the contract, for the amount of the bid, if it is awarded.

A bid bond guarantees that the “obligee” will be paid the difference between the principal's tender price and the next closest tender price. This action is only triggered should the principal be awarded the contract but fails to enter into the contract, as agreed, with the obligee. The bid bond penalty is a percentage of the total bid amount, not to exceed the spread between the first and second place bidders. Some bid bonds contain "forfeiture language", which means that the contractor loses the whole bid bond amount, regardless of the bid spread.

Contractors prefer the use of bid bonds because they are a less expensive option and they do not tie up cash or bank credit lines during the bidding process. Owners and general contractors also use bid bonds because they establish and confirm that the bidding contractor or supplier is qualified to undertake the project.

== Bid bonds in the United Kingdom ==
In the United Kingdom, bid bonds are commonly used in various industries such as construction, supply, and service contracts. One notable application of bid bonds in the UK is for securing HM Revenue and Customs (HMRC) bonds, which are required for businesses dealing with goods subject to excise duty, such as alcohol, tobacco, and fuel. These bonds help ensure that businesses comply with the necessary regulations and pay the appropriate taxes and duties.

HMRC bonds are required for businesses operating in industries regulated by the HM Revenue and Customs Department. These bonds act as a guarantee for the payment of taxes and duties, ensuring that the business complies with the necessary regulations. The bond amount is typically based on the potential tax liability of the business, which may vary depending on the specific industry and type of goods being dealt with.

== Bid bonds in the United States ==
5% and 10% are common on U.S. public projects; many private construction contracts require other amounts.
