= Miller Act =

US federal commerce legislation

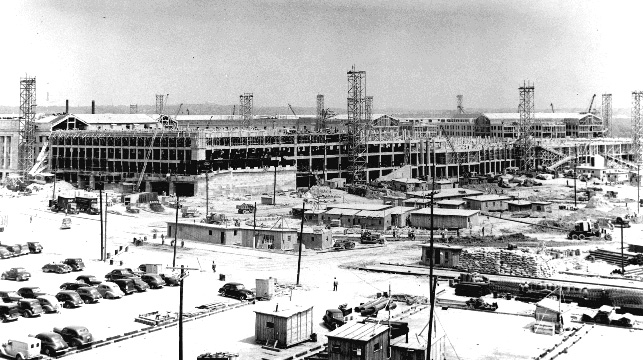
Construction of the Pentagon, 1942.

The Miller Act (ch. 642, Sec. 1-3, 49 stat. 793,794, codified as amended in Title 40 of the United States Code) requires prime contractors on some government construction contracts to post bonds guaranteeing both the performance of their contractual duties and the payment of their subcontractors and material suppliers.

The Act was originally enacted as the Heard Act in 1894. That act established a single performance and payment bond that "did afford some protection to... unpaid subcontractors and materialmen, but it was fraught with substantive and procedural limitations." It was superseded by the Miller Act of 1935, named after its sponsor U.S. Representative John E. Miller (D-AR).

== Background and purpose ==
The Miller Act addresses two concerns that would otherwise exist in the performance of federal government construction projects:

1. Performance Bonds: The contractor's abandonment or other nonperformance of a government job may cause critical delays and added expense in the government procurement process. The bonding process helps weed out irresponsible contractors who may be unable to obtain bonds, and the bond itself will defray the government's cost of substitute performance in the event of default. The subrogration right of the bond surety against the contractor, i.e., the right of the surety to sue the contractor and any principals who may have guaranteed the bond, is a deterrent to nonperformance.
2. Payment Bonds: Subcontractors and material suppliers would otherwise be reluctant to work on such projects (knowing that sovereign immunity prevents the establishment of a mechanic's lien), diminishing competition and driving up construction costs.

== Summary ==
=== Application ===
The Miller Act applies to contracts awarded for the construction, alteration, or repair of any public building or public work of the United States Federal government. While the Act provides that the bonds must be posted on contracts exceeding $100,000, Federal Acquisition Regulation (FAR) Part 28 requires the bonds only on contracts that exceed $150,000.

The Act requires the Federal Acquisition Regulations to establish alternative payment protections for contracts in excess of $30,000 but not exceeding $150,000, with the contract-specific protection to be determined by the contracting officer. While the Miller Act applies only to federal contracts, state legislatures throughout the United States have enacted "Little Miller Acts" that establish similar requirements for state contracts.

=== Posting of performance bonds ===
Once contract is awarded, the contractor must furnish the government a performance bond issued by a surety satisfactory to the officer awarding the contract, in an amount the contracting officer considers adequate, for the protection of the Government.

=== Posting of payment bonds ===
The contractor must also furnish a payment bond with a surety satisfactory to the contracting officer for the protection of all persons supplying labor and material in carrying out the work provided for in the contract for the use of each person. The amount of the payment bond generally must equal the total amount payable by the terms of the contract.

=== Enforcement on payment bonds ===
A subcontractor or material supplier that has not been paid, within 90 days of the day on which he last furnished labor or materials for which the claim is made, may bring a civil action on the payment bond for the amount unpaid at the time the suit is brought.

The suit must be brought no later than one year after the day on which the last of the labor was performed or material was supplied by the person bringing the action.

The agency issuing the contract is required to provide a copy of the payment bond, which identifies the surety, which would be the defendant in an enforcement action, upon the presentation of an affidavit indicating the person requesting the copy has not been paid for labor or materials furnished under the contract.

A person having a direct contractual relationship with a subcontractor, but no contractual relationship, express or implied, with the contractor furnishing the payment bond, may bring a civil action on the payment bond on giving written notice to the contractor within 90 days from the date on which the person did or performed the last of the labor or furnished or supplied the last of the material for which the claim is made. The action must state with substantial accuracy the amount claimed and the name of the party to whom the material was furnished or supplied or for whom the labor was done or performed.

=== Waiver of payment bond rights ===
A waiver of the right to pursue a payment bond action under the Act by a person supplying labor or materials is void unless it was executed in writing, signed by the person whose right is to be waived, and executed after the labor or materials have been supplied.
