= Retainage =

Aspect of construction contracts

Retainage is a portion of the agreed upon contract price deliberately withheld until the work is complete to assure that the contractor or subcontractor will satisfy its obligations and complete a construction project. A retention is money withheld by one party in a contract to act as security against incomplete or defective works. They have their origin in the Railway Mania of the 1840s but are now common across the industry, featuring in the majority of construction contracts. A typical retention rate is 5% of which half is released at completion and half at the end of the defects liability period (often 12 months later). There has been criticism of the practice for leading to uncertainty on payment dates, increasing tensions between parties and putting monies at risk in cases of insolvency. There have been several proposals to replace the practice with alternative systems.

== History and purpose ==
The practice of retainage dates back to the construction of the United Kingdom railway system in the 1840s. The size of the railway project increased demand for contractors, which led to the entrance of new contractors into the labor market. These new contractors were inexperienced, unqualified and unable to successfully complete the project. Consequently, the railway companies began to withhold as much as 20% of contractors' payments to ensure performance and offset completion costs should the contractor default. The point was to withhold the contractor's profit only, not to make the contractor and its subcontractors finance the project.

Given the often large-scale, complexity, cost and length of construction projects, the risk of something not going according to plan is almost certain. Accordingly, a common approach that contracting parties take in order to mitigate this risk is to include retainage provisions within their agreements. The concept of retainage is unique to the construction industry and attempts to do two things: provide an incentive to the contractor or subcontractor to complete the project and protect the owner against any liens, claims or defaults, which may surface as the project nears completion. Incidentally, owners and contractors use retainage as a source of financing for the project, contractors in turn withhold retainage from subcontractors, frequently at a greater percentage than is being withheld from them.

== United Kingdom ==
Retentions are widely used in the British construction industry: in the majority of all contracts awarded, a sum of money is withheld as a security against poor quality products (defects) or works left incomplete. Clients withhold retention against main contractors and main contractors withhold payment against sub-contractors. Retentions typically take the form of a percentage on the contract value. The rate can vary wildly but is typically around 5%. The general state of the economy can affect the rates set: in a buoyant economy with plentiful work sub-contractors are able to pick which work they accept and therefore have potential to negotiate more favourable rates.

The chain of retention starts with the client who withholds money on the main contractor. The main contractor withholds money on sub-contractors who may also then withhold on sub-sub contractors. The retention money is typically released in two portions (known as moieties); the first being payable at completion of a project and the second at the end of the defects liability period. This period is the time during which the client is able to identify works that are defective to the contractor who must then remedy them; it is often twelve months. The use of retentions is not common to all sectors of the industry; for example lift installers have developed their own guarantee system instead.

A mobilization payment is an advance payment to a contractor at the start of a project to assist in the beginning of operations.

=== Impact ===
The use of retentions is intended to encourage efficiency and productivity. The contractor has a financial incentive to achieve completion as early as possible (to release the first moiety payment) and to minimise defects in the works (to achieve the second payment). Retentions held against sub-contractors are also a key source of cash for main contractors, who may use them to finance new projects.

However sub-contractors often complain about the system. They sometimes lack a firm date on which retention monies will be paid and a 2017 British government report noted that more than half of contractors had experienced late or non-payment of retention monies. Delays are reportedly longer for sub-contractors and sub-sub contractors than for the main contractor. This restricts cash flow available for the company as a going concern and for capital investment. The chasing up of payments is also resource intensive, as such smaller businesses are hit more severely than larger ones. Some smaller companies simply write off the retention money, increasing their prices to compensate. The practice has also been described as increasing tensions between the parties in contract.

There is no current requirement for retention monies to be ring-fenced (kept separately to general company funds and preserved from spending) and they are usually held in a client's or contractor's main bank account. This can cause problems in cases of insolvency, where the money can be lost and payments owed to the supply chain put at risk. The use of retentions (which are considered a form of stage payments) can also render construction companies unsuitable for factoring (the sale of accounts receivable).

=== Development in the UK ===
Railway construction in the 1840s saw a rapid increase in the number of contractors, often with little experience of the industry. There was a rise in the number of insolvencies and a drop in workmanship standards. Railway companies therefore began withholding a minimum of 20% of payments to contractors as a security against incomplete and defective works. This practice had spread across the industry by the mid-19th century.

The 1994 Latham Report recommended that legislation be introduced to protect retention monies held by a party, which would prevent it being lost during a liquidation. Despite all of Latham's other payment recommendations being incorporated into the Construction Act 1998 this one was omitted. The practice was reformed somewhat by the Construction Act 2011. This made it illegal for the release of retention under one contract to be linked to that of a second. This ended the practice whereby contractors would refuse to release retention to sub-contractors until they had been paid it themselves by the client, over which the sub-contractor had no influence.

The 2018 collapse of contractor Carillion had a dramatic effect on the industry. Many of its sub-contractors lost large sums of money as £250 million in unpaid retention was lost when the business went into liquidation.

=== Proposed replacement ===
There is limited use of alternatives to retention in the British construction industry. However, there have been recent movements to try to effect change. The Department for Business, Energy and Industrial Strategy (DBEIS) commissioned research into the matter to determine the extent of the use of the practice and its effects on the industry and economy. This was published in 2017 and also identified a number of alternatives to the practice. A DBEIS public consultation was subsequently launched; this closed on 19 January 2018 but no recommendations were subsequently made for government action. A private members bill was introduced to the House of Commons by Peter Aldous on 9 January 2018 seeking to introduce some protection for retention money but did not proceed through parliament.

The Build UK industry group aimed to secure abolition of retentions by 2025, following an ambition outlined by the Construction Leadership Council in 2014. Build UK put forward proposals that retentions by the main contractor on sub-contractors should be no more onerous than those imposed by the client on the main contractor. They also proposed that retentions should only apply to permanent works, as temporary works are unlikely to lead to defects. The organisation also wants small value contracts (less than £100,000) to become retention-free by 2021, as the risk to the main works is lower for these contracts.

The Construction supply chain payment charter, adopted in 2014, had a target for "ZERO retentions" by 2025 in construction contracts dated 1 January 2015 or later, along with the adoption of 30 days' standard payment terms across the construction sector. However, the charter was withdrawn on 18 January 2022 in favour of reporting regulations applicable to large businesses. The reporting regulations lapsed on 6 April 2024.

Some organisations have proposed retention deposit schemes, whereby money is deposited with a third party, although these lead to increased fees and bureaucracy and do not solve disputes between parties over when retention should be released. A mandatory retention deposit system was proposed for inclusion in the Enterprise Act 2016, but the proposed scheme was not subsequently included within the Act. Following the collapse of Carillion there have been increased calls for retention reform. The Scottish Government began a consultation on retentions in 2019. It stated that the UK was behind other countries by continuing the practice, despite the matter having been looked into several times by the UK Government. Alternatives include project bank accounts (which are used for all payments from the client and contractor), retention bonds (see below), performance bonds, escrow stakeholder accounts (monies held by a third party), parent company guarantees (guarantee of completion by the main contractor's parent organisation) or trust funds to hold retention monies.

=== Retention bonds ===
A retention bond is a form of performance bond or insurance against defects, taken out by the contractor at the request of the client, or by a subcontractor at the request of the contractor, seen as being fairer and more efficient than a cash retention. An agreement is entered into by the two parties and a third party known as a surety provider, who acts as a guarantor between the two parties. The agreement states that cash retentions will not be used and, instead, the surety provider agrees to pay up to the amount which would have been held as a cash retention if the contractor or subcontractor fail to carry out the works as contracted or to remedy any defects. Build UK and its predecessor, the National Specialist Contractors Council, have endorsed the use of retention bonds in their Fair Payment Campaign.

=== Contractual basis ===
The Joint Contracts Tribunal contracts system allowed for a reform of retentions by permitting the employer (client) to hold retention monies in trust. The 1998 revision of the contract allowed the contractor to request that the client hold the money in a separate bank account; it also permitted the use of retention bonds. The 2016 JCT contract allows for retention-free projects.

The NEC Engineering and Construction Contract, introduced in 1993, has no allowance for retentions in its core clauses. The basic contract relies on the spirit of collaboration between parties to minimise defects, but retentions can be, and often are, introduced by clients through variant clauses (so-called "x clauses"). There is an allowance for retention bonds within the fourth edition of the contract (introduced in 2017). The contract also allows for retention to be withheld only on the labour-element of any price or only to be applied on the final few payments made. The NEC system also has an option to allow the use of project bank accounts in lieu of retention.

== United States ==
=== Creation and enforcement ===
If there is to be retainage on the construction project, it is set forth in the construction contract. Retainage provisions are applicable to subcontracts as well as prime contracts. The amount withheld from the contractor or subcontractor should be determined on a case-by-case basis by the parties negotiating the contract, usually based upon such factors as past performance and the likelihood that the contractor or subcontractor will perform well under the contract.

One can structure retainage arrangements in any number of ways. Subject to state statutory requirements, 10% is the retainage amount most often used by contracting parties. Another approach is to start off with a 10% retainage and to reduce it to 5% once the project is 50% complete. A third approach is to carve out material costs from a withholding requirement on the theory that suppliers, unlike subcontractors, may not accept retainage provisions in their purchase orders.

Retainage clauses are usually found within the contract terms outlining the procedure for submitting payment applications. A typical retainage clause parallels the following language: "Owner shall pay the amount due on the Payment Application less retainage of [a specific percentage]."

=== Substantial completion ===
Retainage is generally due to the contractor or subcontractor once their work is complete. Disputes often arise regarding just when completion occurs - it could be "substantial completion", which is generally when the owner can occupy a structure and use it for its intended purpose; or more often, it could be once a punch list of work has been completed.

=== Retainage abuse ===
Subcontractors tend to bear the brunt of retainage provisions, especially subcontractors performing work early on in the construction process. The main reason for this, is because many contractors pass down the owner's right to withhold retainage to the subcontractor, but frequently withhold more than is being withheld from them. For example, a subcontractor performing site work may complete its work in the first few months of the construction project, but generally is not allowed to recover the amount withheld from the owner and contractor until the project is "substantially complete", which could take a few years depending on the size of the project. Coupled with a contingent payment clause, the retainage can cause significant financial distress to a subcontractor.

Another problem arises when the contractor withholds from its subcontractors at a greater percentage than the owner has withheld from them. The owner is to pay retainage to the contractor when substantial completion has occurred, however, in this abusive, over-withholding scenario, the contractor will already have been paid a portion of the subcontractors' funds, meaning that the contractor will have to fund the balance of the payment from its own cash flow. This could cause a delay in the project closeout. The contractor may feel that it is more advantageous to keep the project incomplete, than by never being paid its retainage and making the argument that the subcontractors are therefore not due their portion of the retainage.

=== Federal retainage policy ===
In 1974, Congress established the Office of Federal Procurement Policy to provide a uniform government-wide procurement policy. Since the mid-1970s, there has been an overall trend in the reduction of percentage withheld on federal construction projects. The current Federal Acquisition Regulation (F.A.R.) continues to support this trend. Paragraph 32.103 of the regulation states, " . . . Retainage should not be used as a substitute for good contract management, and the contracting officer should not withhold funds without cause. Determinations to retain and the specific amount to be withheld shall be made by the contracting officers on a case-by-case basis. Such decisions will be based on the contracting officer's assessment of past performance and the likelihood that such performance will continue." Currently, federal agencies such as the Department of Defense, the General Services Administration, and the US Department of Transportation have 'zero' retainage policies.

=== Alternatives to retainage ===
Several alternatives exist to standard retainage provisions that provide the same benefits and protections. For example, parties can agree to establish a trust account. A trust account provides the contractor with some control over its money, even if it is being held by the owner. In a trust account, retainage is withheld by the owner, placed in a trust account with a trustee that has a fiduciary relationship to the contractor. The trustee can invest the retainage at the contractor's direction, thereby allowing the contractor to "use" the retained funds that normally would sit idle in an escrow account.

Other alternatives to retainage are to allow the contractor to supply substitute security to the owner in the form of a performance bond, bank letter of credit, or a security of, or guaranteed by, the United States, such as bills, certificates, notes or bonds.

== Other countries ==
Retentions are used in several other countries. They are common in China, though in some cases the moiety payments are guaranteed by the Agricultural Bank of China. They are also used in the United States where the percentage retained is typically higher at around 10%. However the release of retention is different with 50% of the withheld money often released once the works are considered to be 50% complete. Some states have taken measures to abolish or limit the use of retentions in public contracts. In the United States the use of retention bonds is more common than in the UK. Retentions are common in Qatar where the proportion retained may be up to 30% of contract value due to the large number of foreign companies that operate under limited liability law in the state. In Canada retentions are known as "holdback" payments; since 1997 all retention monies in Canada must be held in ring-fenced accounts.

Retentions are used in Australia; in New South Wales all retention monies for projects in excess of $20 million must be held in ring-fenced accounts with an authorised bank. In New Zealand all retention monies are required to be held in trust and must be in cash or other liquid assets; this requirement was introduced following the 2013 collapse of main contractor Mainzeal. However, after the 2019 collapse of Stanley Group it was discovered that retention money was not properly administered, residing in the company's main account, despite the group claiming to sub-contractors that it had been held in separate accounts, and was therefore liable to loss during the liquidation process. The retention system is not used in Germany where the works remain the property of the contractor until completion and are, therefore, liable to be withheld from the client in cases of dispute.

== See also ==
- Construction law
- Contracts
- Cost contingency
- Punch list
