= Notice of Intent to Lien =

In Mechanic's lien law a Notice of Intent to Lien (also known as a Notice of Intent, a Notice of Intent to File a Mechanics Lien, an intent notice, an NOI, or a notice of non-payment) is a type of preliminary notice that warns the property owner, prime contractor, and/or other party on a construction that a mechanics lien or bond claim will be filed unless overdue payments are made within a certain period of time.

A Notice of Intent to Lien is formally required in nine states. In these states, notices of intent must be sent prior to the filing of a mechanics lien claim. These requirements only exist for private projects, there are no notice of intent requirements on state, federal, and other public works projects. The following states require the sending of a Notice of Intent to Lien.

- Arkansas
- Colorado
- Connecticut
- Louisiana
- Missouri
- North Dakota
- Pennsylvania
- Wisconsin
- Wyoming

Sending a Notice of Intent is often helpful even if it is not required because it motivates top-of-chain parties to make payment in order to avoid facing a claim of lien. Delayed payment on construction projects often results from a lack of communication, so sending Notices of Intent and other preliminary notices can help inform parties higher up the payment chain of who is working for them and who has not been paid.
