= Demand guarantee =

A demand guarantee is a guarantee that must be honoured by the guarantor upon beneficiary's demand. The beneficiary is not required to first make a claim or take any action against the obligor of the guaranteed obligation that the guarantee supports. A demand guarantee is enforceable notwithstanding any deficiencies in the enforceability of the underlying obligation.

== Terminology ==
- The guarantor is the person providing the guarantee.
- The obligor is the person whose obligations are supported by the guarantee.
- The underlying obligation is the primary debt or contractual obligation of the obligor that the guarantee supports.
- The beneficiary is person to whom the obligor owes the underlying obligation and who benefits from the guarantee.

== Conditional Guarantees ==
Traditionally, an English law guarantee is a secondary, conditional obligation: It is a promise to pay (or perform) the obligations of a distinct obligor should the obligor itself fail to perform. Therefore:

- The beneficiary of the guarantee must first prove the obligor's default before the guarantor becomes liable to pay.
- The guarantor may raise any legal defences which are available to the obligor.

Thus if the contract giving rise to the underlying obligation is void, the guarantor may also avoid its obligations under the guarantee. Additionally, an obligor's underling obligations may be altered by the operation of insolvency laws.

- The guarantor may also raise defences which are not available to the obligor, especially where the underlying obligation has been changed since execution of the guarantee without the guarantor's consent.

=== Letters of Credit ===
Major differences distinguish letters of credit from "demand guarantees"; in the latter instrument the obligation to pay is conditioned within the terms of the bank's promise, therefore if the demand guarantee is payable upon the beneficiary's written first demand he is assured payment notwithstanding any defence related to any other underlying transactions. Proof of default is not needed and issuers are not concerned with the underlying contract nor can they raise any defence available to the underlying contracting party.

In the United States and Canada, demand guarantees are seldom issued with most money center banks preferring to issue a standby letter of credit (SBLC) instead, primarily due to the banks familiarity with the undertaking. English courts give standby credits the same legal status that is given to demand guarantees. In the pecking order of seniority this, for the most part is true. In cases of a bank becoming insolvent all credit undertakings are deemed to be on par with the common shares of the bank. See Bank for International Settlements, Basel II and Basel III accords.

However, fundamental differences exist between the nature of Demand Guarantees and SBLCs. For example, SBLCs are issued as a contingent liability of the issuing banks and are issued in conjunction with a primary means of underwriting being considered. In effect, SBLCs operate as their name suggests: they are in a "stand-by" position in relation to primary means of repayment. Demand Guarantees can be issued to be the primary means for repayment, in which case they are not necessarily contingent in nature. Because of the contingent and secondary means of collateral nature of the SBLC, it would be considered counter-intuitive for a bank to underwrite a loan or facility strictly on the basis of receiving an SBLC. A bank lending against an SBLC alone in such a manner would in effect be purposefully underwriting a loan with the expectation that there was to be a default, which is not something bank regulators would approve.

Demand Guarantee can be issued as the primary means for meeting the loan or facility repayment terms.

== Role in international trade ==
Demand guarantees developed to replace money deposits, which sellers had to provide to buyers in order to secure the latter against the former's default under the contract. The substitution of money deposits by demand guarantees helped account parties to maintain their liquidity: they were no more forced to tie up their money for a considerable period of time pending completion of the underlying contracts, and where the account party had no sufficient money to pay an upfront deposit it was relieved from the expense of borrowing cash from a banker and paying interest on the loan during its life. The account party also benefits from the low cost of demand guarantees compared to other instruments such as accessory guarantees.

The account party might not trust the beneficiary enough to agree to provide him with a cash deposit; similarly the beneficiary might doubt the account party's solvency and therefore ability to fulfill the underlying contract or its ability to rectify defaults in performance. The demand guarantee bridges the "gap of distrust" that exists between the parties. When the bank issues the demand guarantee, the beneficiary deals with a party whose financial strength he can trust and a party which would pay upon first demand regardless of an existing dispute between the parties on the performance of the underlying contract. More importantly, however, the demand guarantee is also used to reallocate the risks between the parties. In this regard, the demand guarantee is used to avoid three types of risk: judgment risks, execution risks and jurisdictional risks. Judgment risks include, inter alia, risks involved in taking the dispute to court, losing on a procedural issue, the risk of an unfriendly court, evidentiary problems and the threat of political uncertainty that could prevent an action being brought against a party. Execution risks include the risk that a plaintiff could not execute a judgment against the defendant. This is often due to defendant insolvency or due to the unenforceability of one country's court judgments in another country. Finally jurisdictional risks are part of both the above risks: they revolve mainly around the costs and difficulty that a party would endure when bringing an action against the defendant who is usually located in another jurisdiction. Where the beneficiary is issued a demand guarantee by a bank in his own locality, the guarantee aims "to shifting of risks and the cost of bearing them from [the beneficiary to the account party]". Should the beneficiary find the contractor in default, he can immediately seek compensation by demanding on the guarantee and it is the account party who is forced to bring an action to recover any disputed amount. The premise in such transactions is that by agreeing to provide a demand guarantee both the account party and the beneficiary agree that the latter should not be deprived of his money (money due under the guarantee) by litigation against him at the suit of the account party.

Demand guarantees are typically subject to international set of rules, like the ISP98, the URDG758, or the UCP600 by way of reference to such rules in the guarantee.

== See also ==
- Surety bond
- Letter of Credit
