= Mechanic's lien =

Security interest in the title to property to constructors

A mechanic's lien is a security interest in the title to property for the benefit of those who have supplied labor or materials that improve the property. The lien exists for both real property and personal property. In the realm of real property, it is called by various names, including, generically, construction lien. The term "lien" comes from a French root, with a meaning similar to link, which is itself ultimately descended from the Latin ligamen, meaning "bond" and ligare, meaning "to bind". Mechanic's liens on property in the United States date from the 18th century.

== History and reasons for existence ==
Mechanic's liens in their modern form were first conceived by Thomas Jefferson, to encourage construction in the new capital city of Washington. They were established by the Maryland General Assembly, of which the city of Washington was then a part. However, it is not likely that Jefferson single-handedly dreamed up the idea.

At the time Jefferson promoted the law, a lien-like privilege already existed in civil law countries like France, the Dutch Republic and Spain, with some laws even tracing their roots to the Roman Empire. And since control of Louisiana had passed between the French and Spaniards, and had largely adopted the French Napoleonic Code, there was a similar privilege concept in that territory.

It seems highly likely that the legislators working on the first U.S. Mechanic Lien laws had knowledge of, and referenced these civil law concepts. Nevertheless, the United States version was original, as it gave builders a more robust right into the land itself (versus just the improvement's value).

With respect to real property, mechanic's liens are purely statutory devices that exist in every state (although in California, as noted below, they have a constitutional foundation). The reason they exist is a legislative public policy to protect contractors. More specifically, the state legislatures have determined that, due to the economics of the construction business, contractors and subcontractors need greater remedy for non-payment for their work than merely the right to sue on their contracts. In particular, without the mechanics' lien, subcontractors providing either labor or materials may have no effective remedy if their general contractor is not sufficiently financially responsible, because their only contractual right is with that general contractor.

Without the mechanic's lien, the contractor would have a limited number of options to enforce payment of the amounts owed. Further, there is usually a long list of claimants on any failed project. To avoid the specter of various trades, materialmen and suppliers attempting to remove the improvements they have made, and to maintain a degree of equality between the various lienors on a project, the statutory lien scheme was created. Without it, Tradesperson A may try to "race" Supplier B to the courthouse, the project site or the construction lender to obtain payment. Most lien statutes instead mandate strict compliance with the formalized process they create in return for the timely resolution and balancing of claims between all parties involved - both owners and lien claimants.

In the state of California, mechanic's liens are a constitutional right guaranteed to contractors by the California Constitution. This right has been implemented in detail by statutes enacted by the California State Legislature. In Texas, the Texas Constitution gives builders the right to lien and sub contractors are given the right under Chapter 53 of the Texas State Property Code

== Vehicular definition of a lien sale ==
A lien against a vehicle that is asserted by an auto mechanic is technically an "artisan's lien" rather than a "mechanic's lien", but it operates in a similar fashion to a mechanic's lien. A mechanic's lien can only arise against real property i.e., land or buildings. If a person (licensed repair facility) has repaired, furnished supplies or materials, towed or stored a vehicle and has not been paid for the services rendered, that person has a lien against the vehicle. The lien arises at the time the registered owner is presented with a written statement of charges for completed work or services. Although if services were performed that were not agreed upon and no written and signed estimate was issued beforehand, a mechanic has no right to keep the title owner from reclaiming the vehicle. If a mechanic asserts a fee that is not reasonably related to the work performed, and refuses to return the vehicle until that price is paid, the owner of the vehicle will be able to recoup a storage fee from the mechanic, as the mechanic is in the wrong for refusing to return the vehicle. In doing so the mechanic would commit the crime of conversion, or embezzlement.

On the other hand, the mechanic can assess certain expenditures from the owner that are related to the work performed. These expenditures are normally towing, storage fees, and the cost of filing the lien.

If the vehicle is towed by a public agency or private towing company, the lien arises when the vehicle is towed or transported. The lien may be satisfied by selling the vehicle through the lien sale process.

To conduct a lien sale, the person/lienholder must have possession of the vehicle and may require lien sale authorization from the State's Department of Motor Vehicles, depending on the State and or value of the vehicle. Interested parties, including the registered and legal owners of record will be notified, by Registered Mail, before the sale occurs.

== Creation ==
Mechanic's liens exist to secure payment for services, labor and material on both personal and real property. However, the creation and enforcement mechanisms differ depending on whether real or personal property is involved. The law of mechanic's liens on real property governs the creation and enforcement of these liens on items of personal property that have been attached to real property in such a way as to be a fixture.

== Creation and enforcement – personal property ==
The English common law recognized mechanic's liens respecting only personal property. The lien was created by operation of law by the fact of the artisan working on the personal property item or attaching additional material to it. However, to maintain the lien, the artisan had to retain possession of the article until he or she was paid. If the property were returned to the owner before that time, the lien was lost. The lien was enforced by a "self-help" sale of the property and applying the sale proceeds to payment of the amount owed for the workmanship. The sales were non-judicial, i.e., they were held in the same way as a sale of property pawned for a debt.

In America, 34 states now appear to have statutes providing for mechanic's liens on personal property. These statutes tend to modify the common law rules. For example, in Virginia, a mechanic's lien can only be enforced up to the amount of $625, and if the property is valued at over $5,000, it must be sold at a sheriff's auction ordered by the court of appropriate jurisdiction.

== Creation, perfection, priority and enforcement – real property ==
Mechanic's liens on the title to real property are exclusively the result of legislation. Each state has its own laws regarding the creation and enforcement of these liens, but, overall, there are some similar elements among them. Many States distinguish between the types of real property upon which a mechanics lien can be filed.

Under the principle of sovereign immunity, real property of the government (public property) is ordinarily not subject to the claims of private parties. Therefore, unless the state specifically so provides, mechanic's liens do not attach to the title owned by the state or its administrative subdivisions, such as cities. Similarly, mechanic's liens under state law are invalid on federal construction projects. To protect subcontractors and suppliers working on federal projects where the contract price exceeds $100,000.00 the Miller Act requires general contractors to provide a payment bond which guarantees payment for work done in accordance with the terms of the contract. Many state and municipal governments similarly require contractors on public works projects to be bonded under so-called "Little Miller Acts". Theoretically, the payment bond under the Miller Act or Little Miller Act stands in place of the government's property, and qualified claimants make claims against that bond similar to how they would file an ordinary mechanic's lien.

In many states, the legislature has created extra procedures in order for a mechanics lien to be placed on residential property. In New Jersey, which enacted the strictest of these regulations, a mechanics lien can only be placed on residential property after a Notice of Unpaid Balance and Right to File Lien has been filed within 60 days of the lienor's last date of work and an arbitration award has been issued by an American Arbitration Association arbitrator permitting a mechanics lien to be filed.

The act itself of filing a mechanics lien can be difficult. Most States simply require the filing of the mechanics lien with a county or court clerk within a defined amount of time from a triggering event. However, Maryland requires an application to the Court in order to file a mechanics liens. In Maryland, corporations must hire an attorney to make an application to the court.

=== Creation and perfection ===
Under the statutes, the lien is usually created by the performance of labor or the supplying of material that improves the property. Just what type of contribution counts as a valid basis for a mechanics lien varies, depending on the particular state statute that applies. Some common examples are:

- laborers, carpenters, electricians, mechanical/HVAC contractors and plumbers working on the project site;
- lumber yards, plumbing supply houses and electrical suppliers;
- architects and civil engineers who drew up the construction plans and specifications; and
- offsite fabricators of specialty items that are ultimately incorporated into the project.

Often, there is no simple dividing line that is useful in every state, or even in every case, for determining this eligibility. Deciding whether a party has a legitimate lien right may depend on examining court cases that have either upheld or rejected lien claims in the same state.

Unlike other security interests, in most states, mechanic's liens are given to contractors and material suppliers who may or may not have a direct contractual agreement with the owner of the land. In fact, this is often the norm because in most cases, the owner of the land contracts only with a general contractor (often called a "prime contractor"). The general contractor, in turn, hires subcontractors ("subs") and material suppliers ("suppliers") to perform the work. These subs and suppliers are entitled to liens on the owner's property to secure their payment from the general contractor.

However, to have an enforceable lien, it usually must be "perfected". This means that the holder of the lien must comply with the statutory requirements for maintaining and enforcing the lien. These requirements, which contain time limits, are generally as follows:

- Providing the required preliminary notice to the property owner disclosing the entitlement to the lien (some states). Formally this involves serving a Notice of Intent to Lien
- Filing notices of commencement of work (some states).
- Filing notices in the required public records offices of the intention to file a lien if unpaid (some states).
- Filing the notice or claim of lien in the required public records offices within a specified period of time after the materials have been supplied or the work completed (all states). The law varies from state-to-state on both the triggering event and the timing of this. Some states require the filing within a period measured from the time when the claimant completes its work, while others specify the event as being after all work on the project has been completed. The filing time periods after the triggering event vary.

Because of the difficulty often associated with the filing of mechanics liens and compliance with mechanics lien laws, many lienors use attorneys or mechanics lien filing services to ensure that their mechanics lien is filed correctly.

=== Priority respecting other interests ===
The statutes creating mechanic's liens usually give them a higher priority with respect to other interests in the title than the law gives most real property security interests. Among other things, priority is the attribute that determines which of several competing security claims will have the first claim to the funds of a foreclosure sale. In this context, the priority of a mechanic's lien is determined either by the time the lien attaches to the title to the property or by the point in time to which it "relates back". With some exceptions, the lien attaches or relates back to a time prior to the time that any notice of it appears in the public records. In many states, this is specified as the time when the first visible construction commences on the building site. In others, it is when the contract is executed for the work to be done. In still others, each contractor or supplier's lien attaches at the time when it commences its own work. Therefore, persons dealing with the owner of the title to the property risk having their interests unexpectedly subject to mechanic's liens of which they had no knowledge.

Special provisions are made in some states for determining the priority between a mechanic's lien and the lien of a mortgage that is financing the construction on the land. For instance, in the State of New York, the appearance of specified language in the mortgage to the effect that it is a construction loan preserves its priority over mechanic's liens arising out of the construction, as long as subsequently filed lien claims that are legitimate are not ignored. In other states, such as Florida, it is an all or nothing proposition. There, the recording of the construction mortgage before the filing of a statutory notice of commencement of construction provides the mortgage with absolute priority over mechanic's liens arising out of the construction. Still other states, such as California, provide priority for a construction loan mortgage recorded before the visible commencement of construction where the lender is obligated to disburse the funds. In the State of Illinois, there is a statutory funds disbursing scheme that, if followed, provides construction loan mortgage priority. In other states, there are still other arrangements and some states, such as Colorado, provide almost no practical means for a construction loan mortgage to obtain priority at all.

=== Enforcement ===
Mechanic's liens are enforced exclusively through judicial foreclosure sales, i.e., through court proceedings similar to mortgage foreclosures. The court must determine whether the requirements of the statute have been met and, if so, the priority of the mechanic's lien being foreclosed relative to the other liens or encumbrances on the title. Once that is determined, the court will order the property sold and the proceeds of the sale applied to the liens in the order of their priority.

=== Limitations ===
States may have various limitations on mechanic's liens. In California Law a contractor must wait to take advantage of the lien rights until any of the following conditions occur; otherwise the lien will be considered premature:

a) The work is completed according to the contracted scope of work,
b) the project has stopped (cessation), or
c) the person is prevented from finishing the work (terminated).

Each of these required events occur at the end of the project life-cycle (or at the end of the scope of work for the subcontractor, the project may be far from completed). The end of the project may not be remotely close to the actual time when the work was performed (and the time at which labor and materials were paid out of pocket for the work by the contractor).

Also, the work must go directly toward the work of improvement of the property. This may seem obvious, but there are numerous construction costs that are not subject to mechanics' liens. A portion of construction costs may not qualify for a mechanic's lien because the work did not improve the property. A good example are items that are not intended to be permanent, but nevertheless, necessary in the course of construction. A temporary construction fence may be required, may serve a valuable function in safety and security, but is never expected to become part of the realty, so therefore is not a cost that is permitted under a mechanic's lien.

The attractive nature of the mechanic's lien is that the lien is secured by real property and the property can be sold in order to pay the lien. This is powerful tool, but not always efficient. In reality, this is a drawn out process that is not very efficient. However, given the economic conditions, and that lenders' usually have priority, the sale of the property may not be sufficient to pay for the value of the lien.

What is often overlooked is that the contractor is now financing the project when they perform work and do not receive prompt payment for that work. The contractor is now tying up valuable capital that could be used elsewhere while waiting for the end of a project. In addition, the contractor must bear the cost of litigation in order to enforce their mechanic's lien rights. For disputes of a minor value, a mechanic's lien is not going to be a cost-effective method of obtaining payment for services.

=== Releases of Lien ===
A lien release, also known as a release of lien or a cancellation of lien, is a document that may be voluntarily provided by a lien claimant, such as a subcontractor, in exchange for payment or a promise of payment from a general contractor or a property owner. Negotiations may be tricky, as lien claimants generally want to be paid before they release a lien, while the owner of the property subject to the lien will generally want the lien released before they make payment. Unlike a lien waiver that negates the right to file a lien in the future, a lien release cancels a lien that has already been in effect.

Prior to making any payment, the property owner should request a release of lien from every supplier, contractor and subcontractor, which covers the materials used and the work performed on the project. A release of lien is a written statement that releases the property from the threat of lien. If the contract requires partial payments be made before the work is completed in full, then the property owner may request a partial release of lien covering all labor and materials used up to the time of payment.

Before final payment, a property owner should obtain an affidavit from the contractor that lists all unpaid parties who performed labor or services, or provided materials to the property. The property owner should make sure the contractor obtains releases from all of these parties before making final payment.

=== Challenging a lien ===
States typically have a process by which the land owner may challenge the claimant's prima facie entitlement to the liens on grounds such as proper identification of the property, compliance with notice requirements, and timing. If the lien claim survives those challenges, the owner may "bond off" the lien by filing a surety bond with the court in which the lien action has been initiated. This, in effect, frees the property from the lien and allows for sale of the property. The ability to bond off the lien is especially crucial where developers desire to proceed with the sale of newly built homes, which would otherwise remain unsold and unoccupied during the lien litigation process.

== Outside the United States ==
Countries that recognize mechanic's liens often provide for very different rights and procedures than those of the United States.

Some provinces of Canada (including Quebec) and New Zealand recognize a process somewhat analogous to a mechanic's lien. The Canadian province of Newfoundland and Labrador allows for liens similar to those of the United States.

With the exception of Mexico, mechanic's liens are generally not recognized throughout Latin America.

Some countries, such as the United Arab Emirates, specifically prohibit the lien, except where voluntarily undertaken.

== See also ==
- Lien waiver
- List of construction topics
- List of real estate topics
