= Black v The Queen (1993) =

Judgement of the High Court of Australia

- Court: High Court of Australia
- Decided: 22 December 1993
- Citations: [1993] HCA 71, (1993) 179 CLR 44

Case history
- Appealed from: NSW Court of Criminal Appeal

Court membership
- Judges sitting: Mason CJ, Brennan, Deane, Dawson, & McHugh JJ

Black v The Queen is a decision of the High Court of Australia.

In the first trial, Black was found guilty of two crimes of arson by a jury but only after the trial judge had directed the jurors make a majority decision.

On appeal to the High Court of Australia, the decision was set aside, and a new trial ordered.

== The Court's finding ==
The majority ruling found that judge did not instruct the jury appropriately in relation to the flaws in the police interviews. They found that the trial judge should have told them to scrutinise police interviews closely. It additionally found that the jury must be free to deliberate without any pressure being brought upon them.

The Court quashed the conviction, set aside the decision of the New South Wales Court of Criminal Appeal and ordered a new trial.

== Broader applications ==
In Australian law, a "Black direction" is a direction by a judge to a jury to reconsider the votes of a small number of jury members.

In Queensland, a judge may make a "Black direction" to a jury.

== See also ==
- Allen v. United States (1896)
