= List of United States Supreme Court cases, volume 164 =

Supreme Court of the United States
- Interactive map of Supreme Court of the United States
- 38°53′26″N 77°00′16″W
- Established: March 4, 1789; 236 years ago
- Location: Washington, D.C.
- Coordinates: 38°53′26″N 77°00′16″W
- Composition method: Presidential nomination with Senate confirmation
- Authorised by: Constitution of the United States, Art. III, § 1
- Judge term length: life tenure, subject to impeachment and removal
- Number of positions: 9 (by statute)
- Website: supremecourt.gov

This is a list of cases reported in volume 164 of United States Reports, decided by the Supreme Court of the United States in 1896.

== Justices of the Supreme Court at the time of volume 164 U.S. ==
The Supreme Court is established by Article III, Section 1 of the Constitution of the United States, which says: "The judicial Power of the United States, shall be vested in one supreme Court . . .". The size of the Court is not specified; the Constitution leaves it to Congress to set the number of justices. Under the Judiciary Act of 1789 Congress originally fixed the number of justices at six (one chief justice and five associate justices). Since 1789 Congress has varied the size of the Court from six to seven, nine, ten, and back to nine justices (always including one chief justice).

When the cases in volume 164 were decided the Court comprised the following nine members:

Portrait	Justice	Office	Home State	Succeeded	Date confirmed by the Senate (Vote)	Tenure on Supreme Court
	Melville Fuller	Chief Justice	Illinois	Morrison Waite	July 20, 1888 (41–20)	October 8, 1888 – July 4, 1910 (Died)
	Stephen Johnson Field	Associate Justice	California	newly created seat	March 10, 1863 (Acclamation)	May 10, 1863 – December 1, 1897 (Retired)
	John Marshall Harlan	Associate Justice	Kentucky	David Davis	November 29, 1877 (Acclamation)	December 10, 1877 – October 14, 1911 (Died)
	Horace Gray	Associate Justice	Massachusetts	Nathan Clifford	December 20, 1881 (51–5)	January 9, 1882 – September 15, 1902 (Died)
	David Josiah Brewer	Associate Justice	Kansas	Stanley Matthews	December 18, 1889 (53–11)	January 6, 1890 – March 28, 1910 (Died)
	Henry Billings Brown	Associate Justice	Michigan	Samuel Freeman Miller	December 29, 1890 (Acclamation)	January 5, 1891 – May 28, 1906 (Retired)
	George Shiras Jr.	Associate Justice	Pennsylvania	Joseph P. Bradley	July 26, 1892 (Acclamation)	October 10, 1892 – February 23, 1903 (Retired)
	Edward Douglass White	Associate Justice	Louisiana	Samuel Blatchford	February 19, 1894 (Acclamation)	March 12, 1894 – December 18, 1910 (Continued as chief justice)
	Rufus W. Peckham	Associate Justice	New York	Howell Edmunds Jackson	December 9, 1895 (Acclamation)	January 6, 1896 – October 24, 1909 (Died)

== Citation style ==
Under the Judiciary Act of 1789 the federal court structure at the time comprised District Courts, which had general trial jurisdiction; Circuit Courts, which had mixed trial and appellate (from the US District Courts) jurisdiction; and the United States Supreme Court, which had appellate jurisdiction over the federal District and Circuit courts—and for certain issues over state courts. The Supreme Court also had limited original jurisdiction (i.e., in which cases could be filed directly with the Supreme Court without first having been heard by a lower federal or state court). There were one or more federal District Courts and/or Circuit Courts in each state, territory, or other geographical region.

The Judiciary Act of 1891 created the United States Courts of Appeals and reassigned the jurisdiction of most routine appeals from the district and circuit courts to these appellate courts. The Act created nine new courts that were originally known as the "United States Circuit Courts of Appeals." The new courts had jurisdiction over most appeals of lower court decisions. The Supreme Court could review either legal issues that a court of appeals certified or decisions of court of appeals by writ of certiorari.

Bluebook citation style is used for case names, citations, and jurisdictions.

- "# Cir." = United States Court of Appeals
  - e.g., "3d Cir." = United States Court of Appeals for the Third Circuit
- "C.C.D." = United States Circuit Court for the District of . . .
  - e.g.,"C.C.D.N.J." = United States Circuit Court for the District of New Jersey
- "D." = United States District Court for the District of . . .
  - e.g.,"D. Mass." = United States District Court for the District of Massachusetts
- "E." = Eastern; "M." = Middle; "N." = Northern; "S." = Southern; "W." = Western
  - e.g.,"C.C.S.D.N.Y." = United States Circuit Court for the Southern District of New York
  - e.g.,"M.D. Ala." = United States District Court for the Middle District of Alabama
- "Ct. Cl." = United States Court of Claims
- The abbreviation of a state's name alone indicates the highest appellate court in that state's judiciary at the time.
  - e.g.,"Pa." = Supreme Court of Pennsylvania
  - e.g.,"Me." = Supreme Judicial Court of Maine

== List of cases in volume 164 U.S. ==
Case Name	Page & year	Opinion of the Court	Concurring opinion(s)	Dissenting opinion(s)	Lower Court	Disposition
Bear Lake et al. Co. v. Garland	1 (1896)	Peckham	none	none	Sup. Ct. Terr. Utah	affirmed
American R.M. Co. v. Pennock & S. Co.	26 (1896)	Fuller	none	none	C.C.E.D. Pa.	affirmed
United States v. Gilliat	42 (1896)	Peckham	none	none	Ct. Cl.	dismissed
United States v. Hewecker	46 (1896)	Fuller	none	none	C.C.S.D.N.Y.	dismissed
United States v. Kurtz	49 (1896)	Brown	none	none	Ct. Cl.	reversed
Saltonstall v. Birtwell	54 (1896)	Shiras	none	Fuller	1st Cir.	affirmed
McElroy v. United States	76 (1896)	Fuller	none	none	C.C.W.D. Ark.	reversed
United States v. McMahon	81 (1896)	Brown	none	none	2d Cir.	reversed
Parsons v. Venzke	89 (1896)	Brewer	none	none	N.D. Dist. Ct.	affirmed
Central P.R.R. Co. v. United States	93 (1896)	Peckham	none	none	Ct. Cl.	affirmed
White v. United States	100 (1896)	Peckham	none	none	C.C.N.D. Ala.	affirmed
Press Pub. Co. v. Monroe	105 (1896)	Gray	none	none	2d Cir.	dismissed
Fallbrook I. Dist. v. Bradley	112 (1896)	Peckham	none	none	C.C.S.D. Cal.	reversed
Tregea v. Modesto I. Dist.	179 (1896)	Brewer	none	Harlan	Cal.	dismissed
Wisconsin C.R.R. Co. v. United States	190 (1896)	Fuller	none	none	Ct. Cl.	affirmed
United States v. Verdier	213 (1896)	Brown	none	none	Ct. Cl.	reversed
Brown v. United States	221 (1896)	Gray	none	Brewer	C.C.W.D. Ark.	reversed
Prairie S. Nat'l Bank v. United States	227 (1896)	White	none	none	Ct. Cl.	affirmed
Draper v. United States	240 (1896)	White	none	none	C.C.D. Mont.	reversed
Wilson v. Kiesel	248 (1896)	Fuller	none	none	Sup. Ct. Terr. Utah	dismissed
Fowler v. Lamson	252 (1896)	Peckham	none	none	Ill.	dismissed
Lalone v. United States	255 (1896)	Peckham	none	none	C.C.E.D. Wis.	reversed
Old Jordan et al. Co. v. Société Anonyme	261 (1896)	Brown	none	none	Sup. Ct. Terr. Utah	affirmed
Wabash W. Ry. v. Brow	271 (1896)	Fuller	none	none	6th Cir.	reversed
National A. Soc'y v. Spiro	281 (1896)	Fuller	none	none	6th Cir.	certification
United States v. Delaney	282 (1896)	Peckham	none	none	Ct. Cl.	affirmed
McKee v. United States	287 (1896)	Peckham	none	none	Ct. Cl.	affirmed
Glover v. United States	294 (1896)	White	none	none	Ct. Cl.	affirmed
Coughran v. Bigelow	301 (1896)	Shiras	none	none	Sup. Ct. Terr. Utah	affirmed
Cake v. Mohun	311 (1896)	Brown	none	none	D.C. Cir.	affirmed
Citizens' Bank v. Cannon	319 (1896)	Shiras	none	none	C.C.W.D. La.	reversed
Carothers v. Mayer	325 (1896)	Brown	none	none	Mont.	dismissed
Central et al. Co. v. Wright	327 (1896)	Brown	none	none	C.C.S.D. Ga.	affirmed
Gonzales v. French	338 (1896)	Shiras	none	none	Sup. Ct. Terr. Ariz.	affirmed
McClellan v. Chipman T. Nat'l Bank	347 (1896)	White	none	none	Mass. Super. Ct.	affirmed
Edgington v. United States	361 (1896)	Shiras	none	none	C.C.S.D. Iowa	reversed
Noble v. Mitchell	367 (1896)	White	none	none	Ala.	affirmed
United States v. Elliott	373 (1896)	Shiras	none	none	Ct. Cl.	affirmed
Stone v. United States	380 (1896)	Brewer	none	none	Ct. Cl.	affirmed
Northern P.R.R. Co. v. Colburn	383 (1896)	Brewer	none	none	Mont.	reversed
Acers v. United States	388 (1896)	Brewer	none	none	W.D. Ark.	affirmed
Atlantic & P. Ry. Co. v. Laird	393 (1896)	White	none	none	9th Cir.	affirmed
Missouri P. Ry. Co. v. Nebraska	403 (1896)	Gray	none	none	Neb.	reversed
Warner v. Texas P. Ry. Co.	418 (1896)	Gray	none	none	5th Cir.	reversed
Chapman v. United States	436 (1896)	Fuller	none	none	D.C. Cir.	dismissed
Perrine v. Slack	452 (1896)	Fuller	none	none	D.C. Cir.	dismissed
Prather v. United States	452 (1896)	Fuller	none	none	D.C. Cir.	dismissed
Chicago & N. Ry. Co. v. City of Chicago	454 (1896)	Harlan	none	none	Ill.	dismissed
The Kate	458 (1896)	Harlan	none	none	2d Cir.	affirmed
New Orleans W.W. Co. v. City of New Orleans	471 (1896)	Harlan	none	none	C.C.E.D. La.	affirmed
Grimes D.G. Co. v. Malcolm	483 (1896)	Harlan	none	none	8th Cir.	affirmed
Allen v. United States	492 (1896)	Brown	none	none	C.C.W.D. Ark.	affirmed
Willard v. Wood	502 (1896)	Fuller	none	none	D.C. Cir.	affirmed
United States v. Oregon & C.R.R. Co.	526 (1896)	Fuller	none	none	9th Cir.	reversed
Rowe v. United States	546 (1896)	Harlan	none	none	C.C.W.D. Ark.	reversed
Rogers L.M.W. v. American E. Co.	559 (1896)	Harlan	none	none	Iowa	reversed
Covington et al. Co. v. Sandford	578 (1896)	Harlan	none	none	Ky.	reversed
Maish v. Arizona	599 (1896)	Brewer	none	none	Sup. Ct. Terr. Ariz.	affirmed
Gonzales v. Cunningham	612 (1896)	Fuller	none	none	Sup. Ct. Terr. N.M.	affirmed
Starr v. United States	627 (1897)	White	none	none	C.C.W.D. Ark.	reversed
In re Atlantic City R.R. Co.	633 (1897)	Fuller	none	none	C.C.E.D. Pa.	mandamus denied
Texas & P. Ry. Co. v. Bloom's Adm'r	636 (1897)	Shiras	none	none	5th Cir.	affirmed
Mills v. United States	644 (1897)	Peckham	none	none	C.C.W.D. Ark.	reversed
Osborne v. Florida	650 (1897)	Peckham	none	none	Fla.	affirmed
Nofire v. United States	657 (1897)	Brewer	none	none	C.C.W.D. Ark.	reversed
Ford v. Delta & P.L. Co.	662 (1897)	Brewer	none	none	C.C.S.D. Miss.	affirmed
France v. United States	676 (1897)	Peckham	none	none	S.D. Ohio	reversed
Bushnell v. Leland	684 (1897)	White	none	none	D. Conn.	affirmed
United States v. Northwestern et al. Co.	686 (1897)	White	none	none	Ct. Cl.	affirmed
Ex parte Jones	691 (1897)	Brown	none	none	1st Cir.	mandamus denied
Carver v. United States	694 (1897)	Brown	none	none	C.C.W.D. Ark.	reversed

== See also ==
- Certificate of division
