= Allen v. United States =

- Supreme Court of the United States

Submitted October 23, 1896 Decided December 7, 1896
- Full case name: Allen v. United States
- Citations: 164 U.S. 492 (more) 17 S. Ct. 154; 41 L. Ed. 528

Case history
- Prior: Error to the Circuit Court of the United States for the Western District of Arkansas

Holding
- There is no error in a jury instruction encouraging dissenting jurors to reconsider.

Court membership
- Chief Justice Melville Fuller Associate Justices Stephen J. Field · John M. Harlan; Horace Gray · David J. Brewer; Henry B. Brown · George Shiras Jr. Edward D. White · Rufus W. Peckham

Case opinion
- Majority: Brown, joined by unanimous

Allen v. United States, 164 U.S. 492 (1896), was a United States Supreme Court case that, among other things, approved the use of a jury instruction intended to prevent a hung jury by encouraging jurors in the minority to reconsider. The Court affirmed Alexander Allen's murder conviction, having vacated his two prior convictions for the same crime.

Such an instruction became known as an Allen charge and is given when, after deliberation, a jury reports that it is deadlocked and unable to decide on a verdict. Because it is used to dislodge jurors from entrenched positions, the Allen charge is sometimes referred to as the "dynamite charge" or the "hammer charge."

Allen is based upon the Supreme Court's supervisory power over the federal courts. Thus, it is not binding on state courts. Approximately half of US states prohibit Allen charges on state law grounds.

== Background ==
Allen's three trials had been presided over by Judge Isaac C. Parker of the United States District Court for the Western District of Arkansas.

== Opinion ==
The relevant portion of Allen held:

The seventeenth and eighteenth assignments were taken to instructions given to the jury after the main charge was delivered, and when the jury had returned to the court, apparently for further instructions. These instructions were quite lengthy, and were, in substance, that in a large proportion of cases absolute certainty could not be expected; that, although the verdict must be the verdict of each individual juror, and not a mere acquiescence in the conclusion of his fellows, yet they should examine the question submitted with candor, and with a proper regard and deference to the opinions of each other; that it was their duty to decide the case if they could conscientiously do so; that they should listen, with a disposition to be convinced, to each other's arguments; that, if much the larger number were for conviction, a dissenting juror should consider whether his doubt was a reasonable one which made no impression upon the minds of so many men, equally honest, equally intelligent with himself. If, upon the other hand, the majority were for acquittal, the minority ought to ask themselves whether they might not reasonably doubt the correctness of a judgment which was not concurred in by the majority. These instructions were taken literally from a charge in a criminal case which was approved of by the supreme court of Massachusetts and by the supreme court of Connecticut. While, undoubtedly, the verdict of the jury should represent the opinion of each individual juror, it by no means follows that opinions may not be changed by conference in the jury room. The very object of the jury system is to secure unanimity by a comparison of views, and by arguments among the jurors themselves. It certainly cannot be the law that each juror should not listen with deference to the arguments, and with a distrust of his own judgment, if he finds a large majority of the jury taking a different view of the case from what he does himself. It cannot be that each juror should go to the jury room with a blind determination that the verdict shall represent his opinion of the case at that moment, or that he should close his ears to the arguments of men who are equally honest and intelligent as himself. There was no error in these instructions.

== Text of Allen charge ==
Because of the variability of the exact phrasing in the delivery of an Allen charge depending on the court applying it, some jurists have noted it is imprecise to refer to a singular, unified "Allen charge" when in fact multiple, non-identical instructions exist. To illustrate, differing instructions by three federal courts in different circuits are presented below:

=== Fifth Circuit ===
Members of the Jury:

I'm going to ask that you continue your deliberations in an effort to reach agreement upon a verdict and dispose of this case; and I have a few additional comments I would like for you to consider as you do so.

This is an important case. The trial has been expensive in time, effort, money and emotional strain to both the defense and the prosecution. If you should fail to agree upon a verdict, the case will be left open and may have to be tried again. Obviously, another trial would only serve to increase the cost to both sides, and there is no reason to believe that the case can be tried again by either side any better or more exhaustively than it has been tried before you.

Any future jury must be selected in the same manner and from the same source as you were chosen, and there is no reason to believe that the case could ever be submitted to twelve men and women more conscientious, more impartial, or more competent to decide it, or that more or clearer evidence could be produced.

If a substantial majority of your number are in favor of a conviction, those of you who disagree should reconsider whether your doubt is a reasonable one since it appears to make no effective impression upon the minds of the others. On the other hand, if a majority or even a lesser number of you are in favor of an acquittal, the rest of you should ask yourselves again, and most thoughtfully, whether you should accept the weight and sufficiency of evidence which fails to convince your fellow jurors beyond a reasonable doubt.

Remember at all times that no juror is expected to give up an honest belief he or she may have as to the weight or effect of the evidence; but, after full deliberation and consideration of the evidence in the case, it is your duty to agree upon a verdict if you can do so.

You must also remember that if the evidence in the case fails to establish guilt beyond a reasonable doubt the Defendant should have your unanimous verdict of Not Guilty.

You may be as leisurely in your deliberations as the occasion may require and should take all the time which you may feel is necessary.

I will ask now that you retire once again and continue your deliberations with these additional comments in mind to be applied, of course, in conjunction with all of the other instructions I have previously given to you.

=== Ninth Circuit ===
Members of the jury, you have reported that you have been unable to reach a unanimous verdict in this case. I have decided to suggest a few additional thoughts to you.

As jurors, you have a duty to discuss the case with one another and to deliberate in an effort to reach a unanimous verdict if each of you can do so without violating your individual judgment and conscience. Each of you must decide the case for yourself, but only after you consider the evidence impartially with your fellow jurors. During your deliberations, you should not hesitate to reexamine your own views and change your opinion if you become persuaded that it is wrong. You should not, however, change an honest belief as to the weight or effect of the evidence solely because of the opinions of your fellow jurors or for the mere purpose of returning a verdict.

I also remind you that in your deliberations you are to consider the instructions that I have given you as a whole. You should not single out any part of any instruction, including this one, and ignore others. They are all equally important.

What I have just said is not meant to rush you or pressure you into agreeing on a verdict. Take as much time as you need to discuss things. There is no hurry.

I ask that you now return to the jury room and continue your deliberations with these additional comments in mind.

=== Tenth Circuit ===
Members of the jury, I am going to ask that you return to the jury room and deliberate further. I realize that you are having some difficulty reaching a unanimous agreement, but that is not unusual. Sometimes, after further discussion, jurors are able to work out their differences and agree.

This is an important case. If you should fail to agree upon a verdict, the case is left open and must be tried again. Obviously, another trial would require the parties to make another large investment of time and effort, and there is no reason to believe that the case can be tried again by either side better or more exhaustively than it has been tried before you.

You are reminded that the defendant is presumed innocent, and that the government, not the defendant, has the burden of proof and it must prove the defendant guilty beyond a reasonable doubt. Those of you who believe that the government has proved the defendant guilty beyond a reasonable doubt should stop and ask yourselves if the evidence is really convincing enough, given that other members of the jury are not convinced. And those of you who believe that the government has not proved the defendant guilty beyond a reasonable doubt should stop and ask yourselves if the doubt you have is a reasonable one, given that other members of the jury do not share your doubt. In short, every individual juror should reconsider his or her views.

It is your duty, as jurors, to consult with one another and deliberate with a view toward reaching an agreement, if you can do so without violence to individual judgment. Each of you must decide the case for yourself but do so only after an impartial consideration of the evidence with your fellow jurors. In the course of your deliberations do not hesitate to reexamine your own views and change your opinion if you are convinced it is erroneous. But do not surrender your honest conviction as to the weight or effect of evidence solely because of the opinion of your fellow jurors, or for the mere purpose of returning a verdict.

What I have just said is not meant to rush or pressure you into agreeing on a verdict. Take as much time as you need to discuss things. There is no hurry.

I will ask now that you retire once again and continue your deliberations with these additional comments in mind to be applied, of course, in conjunction with all of the instructions I have previously given you.

== In state courts ==
Some states have a corresponding procedure to an Allen charge for trials in state courts. In Massachusetts, it is known as a Tuey–Rodriguez charge, after the 1851 case Commonwealth v. Tuey, which was the first state supreme court decision to uphold such a charge and a key precedent for Allen, as well as the 1973 case Commonwealth v. Rodriguez which modified it.

Allen charges have been rejected, in whole or in part, by at least twenty-three states. Twenty-two states have rejected the charge by judicial decision:

- Alaska
- Arizona
- California
- Colorado
- Hawaii
- Idaho
- Kentucky
- Louisiana
- Maine
- Michigan
- Minnesota
- Montana
- Nebraska
- Nevada
- New Hampshire
- New Mexico
- North Dakota
- Ohio
- Oregon
- Pennsylvania
- Rhode Island
- Tennessee
- Wisconsin
- Wyoming

== See also ==
- Black direction (Australian law), Black v The Queen (1993); 179 CLR 44
