= Punch list =

Construction project document

A punch list or snag list is a document prepared during key milestones or near the end of a construction project listing works that do not conform to contract drawings and specifications that the general contractor must correct prior to final payment. The work may include incomplete or incorrect installations or incidental damage to existing finishes, material, and structures. The list is usually made by the owner, architect or designer, or general contractor while they tour and visually inspect the project.

In the United States construction industry, contract agreements are usually written to allow the owner to withhold (retain) the final payment to the general contractor as "retainage". The contractor is bound by the contract to complete a list of contract items, called a punch list, in order to receive final payment from the owner. The designer (typically a licensed professional architect or engineer) is usually also incorporated into the contract as the owner's design representative and agent, to verify that completed contract work has complied with the design.

In most contracts, the general conditions of the contract for construction require the contractor, when they believe it to be so, to declare the construction project to have reached "substantial completion" and to request a "pre-final" inspection. According to the General Conditions (AIA A201 Section 9.8.2), the Contractor prepares and submits to the architect a comprehensive list of items to be completed or corrected. This snag list, as generated by the Contractor, is known as the punch list. Upon receipt of the contractor's list, the architect then inspects the work to determine if the work is "substantially complete."

Final payment to the contractor is only made when all of the items on the punch list have been confirmed to meet the project-design specifications required by the contract, or some other mutually agreed resolution for each item has been reached.

Examples of punch-list items include damaged building components (e.g. repair broken window, replace stained wallboard, repair cracked paving, etc.), or problems with the final installation of building materials or equipment (for example, install light fixture, connect faucet plumbing, install baseboard trim, reinstall peeling carpet, replace missing roof shingles, rehang misaligned exterior door, fire and pressure-test boiler, obtain elevator use permit, activate security system, and so on).

Under one hypothesis, the phrase takes its name from the historical process of punching a hole in the margin of the document, next to one of the items on the list. This indicated that the work was completed for that particular construction task. Two copies of the list were punched at the same time, in order to provide an identical record for the architect and contractor.

A rolling punch list is the most common approach towards managing these tasks efficiently and thereby minimizing the likelihood of having to grapple with large number of punch-list items at the end of a major project. A rolling punch list entails constantly verifying the work status throughout the duration of the project, with a rigid closeout schedule being assigned to each task. Finishing the project error-free requires planning, communication, and managing the punch list throughout the project.

== Construction punch list software ==
Starting in 2013 when mobile software became popular on construction sites, many construction teams started using software to manage their punch lists. Today there are a variety of punch list applications, ranging from simple mobile apps to more comprehensive web and mobile platforms.

== See also ==
- Check sheet – Form (document) used to collect data in real time at the location where the data is generated
- Checklist – Aide-memoire to ensure consistency and completeness in carrying out a task
- Task list organization – Planning time spent on specific activities
