= Press Publishing Co. v. Monroe =

- Supreme Court of the United States

Submitted October 19, 1896 Decided November 9, 1896
- Full case name: Press Publishing Company v. Monroe
- Citations: 164 U.S. 105 (more) 17 S. Ct. 40; 41 L. Ed. 367

Holding
- Due to diversity jurisdiction, the circuit court's decision was valid. Dismissed because a Supreme Court petition must invoke the Constitution or the laws of the United States, and a common law copyright claim does neither.

Court membership
- Chief Justice Melville Fuller Associate Justices Stephen J. Field · John M. Harlan; Horace Gray · David J. Brewer; Henry B. Brown · George Shiras Jr. Edward D. White · Rufus W. Peckham

Press Publishing Co. v. Monroe, 164 U.S. 105 (1896), was a United States Supreme Court case in which the Court held that the circuit court's decision was valid due to the case's diversity jurisdiction. They dismissed the case because a Supreme Court petition must invoke the Constitution or the laws of the United States, and the common law copyright claim did neither.
