= Prairie State Bank v. United States =

- Supreme Court of the United States

Decided November 30, 1896
- Full case name: Prairie State Bank v. United States
- Citations: 164 U.S. 227 (more)

Holding
- An equitable claim by a surety to percentages of payment retained by the federal government has priority over the claim of an assignee-lender.

Court membership
- Chief Justice Melville Fuller Associate Justices Stephen J. Field · John M. Harlan; Horace Gray · David J. Brewer; Henry B. Brown · George Shiras Jr. Edward D. White · Rufus W. Peckham

Case opinion
- Majority: White, joined by unanimous

Prairie State Bank v. United States, 164 U.S. 227 (1896), was a United States Supreme Court case in which the court held that an equitable claim by a surety to percentages of payment retained by the federal government has priority over the claim of an assignee-lender.
