= Dispute board =

Method of anticipating and resolving commercial disputes

A dispute board (DB), dispute review board (DRB) or dispute adjudication board (DAB) is a forum for dispute resolution, typically comprising three independent and impartial persons selected by the contracting parties. The significant difference between Dispute Review Boards and most other techniques for alternate dispute resolution, potentially accounting for the success of such boards in recent years, is that a Dispute Review Board is appointed at the commencement of a project before any disputes arise and, by undertaking regular visits to the site, is actively involved throughout the project (and possibly any agreed period thereafter).

== Overview ==
A Dispute Board becomes a part of the project administration and thereby can influence, during the contract period, the performance of the contracting parties. It has 'real-time' value. The idea behind a standing Dispute Resolution Board is that it may be called upon early in the evolution of any dispute which cannot be resolved by the parties and be asked to publish decisions or recommendations on how the matters in issue should be settled. It is usual (but not compulsory) that an opportunity remains for the matter to be referred to arbitration or to the courts if the Dispute Review Board's decision does not find acceptance by the parties. Thus a Dispute Resolution Board may be likened to the United Kingdom's adjudication process, either under statutory-compliant contracts or under the regime established by statute itself. What a Dispute Review Board does that United Kingdom statutory adjudication does not do is to provide a regular and continuing forum for discussion of difficult or contentious matters, to identify ways forward by acting in an informal capacity and to create valuable opportunities for the parties to avoid disputes by keeping proactive communication alive. Another aspect, which is less often discussed, is that by establishing a Dispute Board from the inception of the project the Dispute Board members become part of the project team and are thought of in a different fashion and because of their "hands on" approach can be trusted to be fair and impartial and their advice respected and taken more readily than would a third party or stranger to the project.

The terms "Dispute Board" and "Dispute Review Board" are generic terms and include (a) the Dispute Review Board (DRB) which is a device that originated in the USA and provides non-binding recommendations); (b) the Dispute Adjudication Board (DAB) which is a device emerging from the earlier USA model, but which provides a decision that has interim-binding force); and (c) the Combined Dispute Board (CDB), which is a hybrid of Dispute Review Boards and Dispute Adjudication Boards which was created by the International Chamber of Commerce in 2004. Various other terms have been used such as Dispute Settlement Panel, Dispute Mediation Board, Dispute Avoidance Panel and Dispute Conciliation Panel. Fundamentally these different varieties of Dispute Review devices are the same, each providing early adjudication based on the contractual bargain between the parties.

In the construction industry, dispute boards have been in use for over 50 years. A Dispute Review Board is established by contract; the parties establish and empower a Dispute Review Board with jurisdiction to hear and advise on the resolution of disputes. Within the United Kingdom it is entirely possible for the contracting parties to establish a Dispute Review Board to adjudicate construction contract disputes within the statutory requirement for adjudication. As yet, there are no statutory requirements for Dispute Review Boards to be established to adjudicate disputes under construction contracts.

While the origins of Dispute Review Boards are found in the construction industry, their ambit is far wider than construction, and Dispute Review Boards are now found in the financial services industry, the maritime industry, long-term concession projects, operational and maintenance contracts. The scope for Dispute Review Boards has been described as substantial. The emergence of the International Chamber of Commerce as an active supporter of Dispute Boards, as well as the Dispute Board Federation and the Dispute Resolution Board Foundation, makes it highly probable that dispute boards will be established in a range of industries that, until now, have not used adjudication to any great extent.

== Cost savings ==
Some studies have shown that the cost of a Dispute Board will result in even the most strenuous dispute being resolved and with an almost 99% success rate of dispute resolution without the need for either costly litigation or arbitration the savings are enormous. The reason this is significant is because the construction industry has a reputation for disputes and conflict. Anecdotal evidence from Australia, for example, indicates that 50% of all legal cost associated with construction is expended in connection with disputes. In almost 10% of projects, between 8% and 10% of the total project cost was legal cost. Not surprisingly, these projects have a high incidence of disputes. This expenditure, which globally represents an enormous sum each year, does not begin to take into account the hidden costs of disputes; the damage to reputations and commercial relationships, the cost of time spent by executive personnel, and the cost of lost opportunities. The situation is aggravated by the increased use of joint ventures both in consulting and in contracting. Such organisations are less autonomous and perhaps less able to negotiate settlements of their contractual problems.

== ICC Rules ==
The International Chamber of Commerce recommends inclusion of a dispute review board clause in a major contract and provides a set of rules which can be used to ensure boards can operate in a predictable manner in avoiding or resolving disagreements.
