= Lien waiver =

In the mechanics lien process, a lien waiver is a document from a contractor, subcontractor, materials supplier, equipment lessor or other party to the construction project (the claimant) stating they have received payment and waive any future lien rights to the property (of the owner) for the amount paid. There are typically four types of lien waivers:

- Conditional waiver on progress payment – The safest waiver for claimants, this waiver generally specifies that if they have indeed been paid to date (and that includes no return or stopped payment checks) the waiver is an effective proof against any lien claim on the property.
- Unconditional waiver on progress payment – This waiver releases all claimant rights through a specific date unconditionally (and that includes no return or stopped payment checks).
- Conditional waiver on final payment – This waiver releases all claimant rights to file a mechanics lien if they have indeed been paid to date (and that includes no return or stopped payment checks).
- Unconditional final waiver final payment – The safest waiver for owners, this waiver generally releases all rights of the claimant to place a mechanics lien on the owners property unconditionally. It is immaterial if the payment check has been returned or stopped payment. Claimants should issue this type of release only when they are positive their work is done and the payment has cleared their bank. Owners should demand this release when they are paid in full. Some states allow an Unconditional Release upon final payment that is used to induce the final payment. It is an inherent vagary in the lien release law.

In the United States, some states only use a conditional waiver on progress payment and an unconditional waiver on final payment.

The mechanics lien process can be of great value to claimants in enforcing their claims, if done according to the laws of the various states, or the federal government. These parties are entitled to be paid for their material or labor contributions to the improvement of real property. Most forms for the process can be obtained from local office supply stores, and a few computer programs exist to handle the process on a nationwide basis.
