= Payment bond =

Surety bond for federal contractors

A payment bond is a surety bond posted by a contractor to guarantee that its subcontractors and material suppliers on the project will be paid. They are required in contracts over $35,000 with the Federal Government and must be 100% of the contract value. They are often required in conjunction with performance bonds.
