= General contractor =

Construction manager

A general contractor (North American English) or builder (British English), is a construction manager responsible for the day-to-day oversight of a construction site, management of vendors and trades, and the communication of information to all involved parties throughout the course of a building project.

In the United States, a contractor may be a sole proprietor managing a project and performing labor or carpentry work, have a small staff, or may be a very large company managing billion dollar projects. Some builders build new homes, some are remodelers, some are developers. Licensing requirements to work legally on construction projects vary from locale to locale.

== Description ==
A general contractor is a construction manager employed by a client, usually upon the advice of the project's architect or engineer. General contractors are mainly responsible for the overall coordination of a project and may also act as building designer and construction foreman (a tradesman in charge of a crew).

A general contractor must first assess the project-specific documents (referred to as a bid, proposal, or tender documents). In the case of renovations, a site visit is required to get a better understanding of the project. Depending on the project delivery method, the general contractor will submit a fixed price proposal or bid, cost-plus price or an estimate. The general contractor considers the cost of home office overhead, general conditions, materials, and equipment, as well as the cost of labor, to provide the owner with a price for the project.

Contract documents may include drawings, project manuals (including general, supplementary, or special conditions and specifications), and addendum or modifications issued prior to proposal/bidding and prepared by a design professional, such as an architect.The general contractor may also assume the role of construction manager, responsible for overseeing the project while assuming financial and legal risks. There are several types of risks can occur include cost overruns, delays, and liabilities related to safety or contract breaches.

Prior to formal appointment, the selected general contractor to whom a client proposes to award a contract is often referred to as a "preferred contractor".

== Responsibilities ==
General contractors are responsible for the day-to-day oversight of a construction site, management of vendors and trades, and the communication of information to all involved parties throughout the course of a building project. A general contractor is responsible for providing all of the material, labor, equipment (such as heavy equipment and tools) and services necessary for the construction of the project. A general contractor often hires specialized subcontractors to perform all or portions of the construction work. When using subcontractors, the general contractor is responsible for overseeing the quality of all work performed by any and all of the workers and subcontractors.

It is a best practice for general contractors to prioritize safety on the job site, and they are generally responsible for ensuring that work takes place following safe practices.

A general contractor's responsibilities may include applying for building permits, advising the person they are hired by, securing the property, providing temporary utilities on site, managing personnel on site, providing site surveying and engineering, disposing or recycling of construction waste, monitoring schedules and cash flows, and maintaining accurate records.

The general contractor may be responsible for some part of the design, referred to as the "contractor's design portion" (JCT terminology).

== Terminology ==
=== United Kingdom, Commonwealth and Australia usage ===
In the United Kingdom, Australia and some British Commonwealth countries, the term general contractor was gradually superseded by builders during the early twentieth century. This was the term used by major professional, trade, and consumer organizations when issuing contracts for construction work, and thus the term general contractor fell out of use except in large organizations where the main contractor is the top manager and a general contractor shares responsibilities with professional contractors.

General contractors who conduct work for government agencies are often referred to as builders. This term is also used in contexts where the customer's immediate general contractor is permitted to sub-contract or circumstances are likely to involve sub-contracting to specialist operators, e.g. in various public services.

=== United States and Asia usage ===
In the United States and Asia, the terms general contractor (or simply contractor), prime contractor, and main contractor are often used interchangeably when referring to small local companies that perform residential work. These companies are represented by trade organizations such as the National Association of Home Builders.

In the United States, a contractor may be a sole proprietor managing a project and performing labor or carpentry work, have a small staff, or may be a very large company managing billion dollar projects. Some builders build new homes, some are remodelers, some are developers. In relation to federal government contracting, the "prime" contractor is usually the organization which holds the government contract and other supply chain partners relate to the government via the prime contractor. In the US defense industry, industry consolidation since the 1990s has led to some contractors becoming "super" prime contractors: a UK government assessment of defence policy published in 2002 referred to Boeing, Lockheed Martin, Raytheon and Northrop Grumman as the best US examples.

== Licensing requirements ==
Licensing requirements to work legally on construction projects vary from locale to locale.

In the United States, there are no federal licensing requirements to become a general contractor, but most US states require general contractors to obtain a local license to operate. It is the states' responsibility to define these requirements: for example, in the state of California, the requirements are stated as follows:

With a few exceptions, all businesses or individuals who work on any building, highway, road, parking facility, railroad, excavation, or other structure in California must be licensed by the California Contractors State License Board (CSLB) if the total cost of one or more contracts on the project is $500 or more.

In every state that requires a license, a surety bond is required as part of the licensing process, with the exception of Louisiana, where bonding requirements may vary in different parishes. Not all states require general contractor licenses - these include Vermont, New Hampshire and Maine, among others.

== Licensing qualifications ==
Some general contractors obtain bachelor's degrees in construction science, building science, surveying, construction safety, or other disciplines.

General contractors often learn about different aspects of construction, including masonry, carpentry, framing, and plumbing. Aspiring general contractors communicate with subcontractors and may learn the management skills they need to run their own company.

Experience in the construction industry as well as references from customers, business partners, or former employers are demanded. Some jurisdictions require candidates to provide proof of financing to own their own general contracting firm.

General contractors often run their own business. They hire subcontractors to complete specialized construction work and may manage a team of plumbers, electricians, bricklayers, carpenters, iron workers, technicians, handymans, architects and roofers. General contractors build their business by networking with potential clients, buying basic construction tools, and ensuring that their subcontractors complete high-quality work. General contractors do not usually complete much construction work themselves, but they need to be familiar with construction techniques so they can manage workers effectively. Other reasons include access to specialist skills, flexible hiring and firing, and lower costs.

== General contractor example ==
A property owner or real estate developer develops a program of their needs and selects a site (often with an architect). The architect assembles a design team of consulting engineers and other experts to design the building and specify the building systems. Today, contractors frequently participate on the design team by providing pre-design services such as providing estimations of the budget and scheduling requirements to improve the economy of the project. In other cases, the general contractor is hired at the close of the design phase. The owner, architect, and general contractor work closely together to meet deadlines and budget. The general contractor works with subcontractors to ensure quality standards; subcontractors specialise in areas such as electrical wiring, plumbing, masonry, etc.

== See also ==
- Anti-Kickback Enforcement Act of 1986
- Construction bidding
- Construction communication
- Performance bond
- Ownerbuilder
- Construction management
- Contract management
- Lien waiver
- List of construction occupations
- Mechanic's lien
- Subcontractors
- Punch list

== Sources ==
- Tieder Jr, J.B; Cox, R.K. (1983). "Construction management and the specialty trade (prime) contractors". Law & Contemporary Problems. 46 (1): 39–49. doi:10.2307/1191578. JSTOR 1191578.
- Nicastro, Luke A. (12 October 2023). "The U.S. Defense Industrial Base: Background and Issues for Congress (R47751)". Congressional Research Service.
- Carril, Rodrigo; Duggan, Mark (2020). "The impact of industry consolidation on government procurement: Evidence from Department of Defense contracting". Journal of Public Economics. 184 104141. doi:10.1016/j.jpubeco.2020.104141.
