= Damp (structural) =

Presence of unwanted moisture in the structure of a building

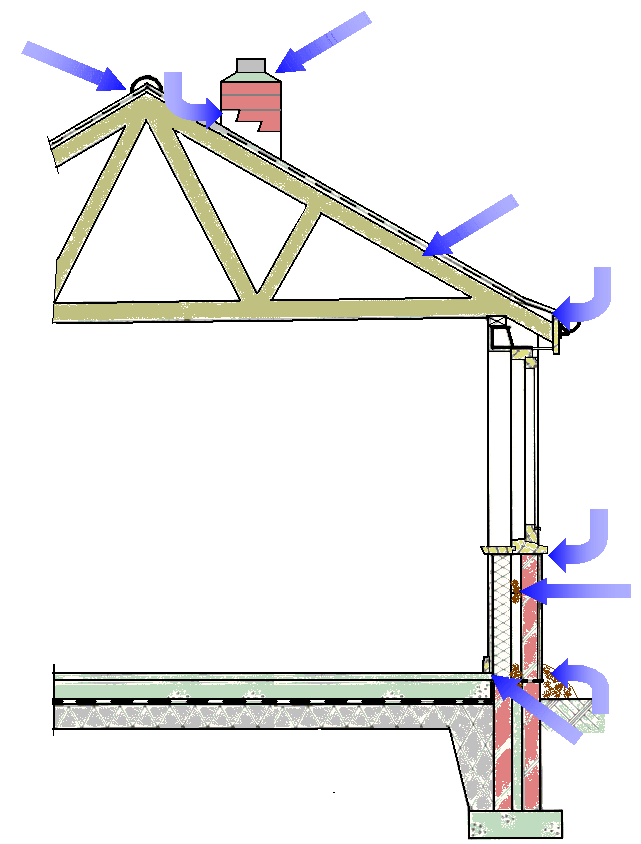
Detail showing some of the causes of damp penetration

Structural dampness is the presence of unwanted moisture in the structure of a building, either the result of intrusion from outside or condensation from within the structure. A high proportion of damp problems in buildings are caused by ambient climate dependent factors of condensation and rain penetration. Capillary penetration of fluid from the ground up through concrete or masonry is known as "rising damp" and is governed by the shape and porosity of the construction materials through which this evaporation-limited capillary penetration takes place. Structural damp, regardless of the mechanisms through which it takes place, is exacerbated by higher levels of humidity.

Dampness control is fundamental to the proper functioning of any building. Controlling moisture is important to protect occupants from adverse health effects and to protect the building, its mechanical systems and its contents from physical or chemical damage.

== Symptoms ==
Dampness tends to cause secondary damage to a building. The unwanted moisture enables the growth of various fungi in wood, causing rot or mold health issues and may eventually lead to sick building syndrome. Plaster and paint deteriorate and wallpaper loosens. Stains, from the water, salts and from mold, mar surfaces. The highest airborne mold concentrations are found in buildings where significant mold infestation has occurred, usually as a result of severe water intrusion or flood damage. Molds can grow on almost any surface and occur where there is moisture from structural problems such as leaky roofs or high humidity levels. Airborne mold concentrations have the potential to be inhaled and can have health effects.

Externally, mortar may crumble, and salt stains may appear on the walls. Steel and iron fasteners rust. It may also cause a poor indoor air quality and respiratory illness in occupants. In extreme cases, mortar or plaster may fall away from the affected wall.

== Identification ==
A wide range of instruments and techniques can be used to investigate the presence of moisture in building materials. When used correctly, they can provide a valuable aid to investigation. The competence and experience of the person undertaking the damp investigations is often of greater importance than the kit he or she carries. Experience and qualified surveyors are the difference between a correct and incorrect diagnosis of damp. For example, it is sometimes found that condensation is misdiagnosed as another form of dampness resulting in the wrong form of treatment being specified. Chartered building surveyors are usually experienced in identifying dampness issues; however, their reports often suggest that dampness problems are investigated by a specialist damp and timber surveyor with a CSRT qualification. An experienced surveyor would usually be able to pinpoint the cause of damp, for example a leaking gutter causing rainwater to cascade and saturate the external structural wall which in turn causes rainwater to ingress internally and adversely affect the internal building fabric.

== Prevention and treatment ==
Most forms of dampness can be prevented by thoughtful building design and careful construction. In the UK, well built modern houses include damp proofing in the form of a synthetic damp-proof course (DPC), about 15 cm (5.9 in) above ground level, to act as a barrier through which water cannot pass. Slate or "engineering bricks" with a low porosity were often used for the first few courses above ground level, and these can help minimise the problem.

There are many approaches to the treatment of dampness in existing buildings. Key to the selection of an appropriate treatment is a correct diagnosis of the types of dampness affecting a building. Details of possible treatments for specific types of dampness are covered in the sections below.

The cause of the dampness must first be eliminated, by providing better drainage or fixing leaking pipes. Several methods of treating rising damp are possible, including the use of land-drains and the insertion of physical and chemical DPCs.

== Humidity ==
Humidity occurs in indoor environments due to building related causes. Porous walls, rising damp, and leaks in the building are determinants for structural dampness due to elevated humidity levels. The construction of the building can also lead to humidity and unwanted moisture in the indoor environment. Wet materials, such as lumber stored unprotected outdoors before construction, can lead to increased humidity indoors for up to the second year of occupancy in the building. Most commonly in residences, elevated relative humidity is produced by poor drainage systems. This leads to dampness in substructures such as crawlspaces and basements. The dampness results in vaporization where water vapor is transmitted into the building's interiors. Water vapor may enter the building through supply air ducts in building slabs and circulated by warm forced air. Water vapor can also enter a building through leaky return air ducts in homes with crawlspaces.

Human occupancy adds a significant amount of humidity to the indoor environment. Personal activity as basic as breathing and perspiration add moisture to an indoor space. Cooking and showering raise humidity levels in the indoor environment, which directly affects the structural dampness of a home. Aspects of the home can also increase the humidity of a space. Items such as aquariums, indoor swimming pools, hot tubs, and even indoor plants add to the humidity of an indoor space. All of these attributes can increase the humidity of a home beyond its recommended thirty to fifty percent.

Humidity levels in an indoor environment need to be accounted for based upon season and temperature. If humidity levels do not agree with the time of the year and the temperature during seasons, mold infestation and deterioration of the building will occur due to moisture. An acceptable humidity level in indoor spaces ranges from twenty to sixty per cent year round. However, levels less than twenty per cent in the winter and levels higher than sixty per cent in the summer are deemed unacceptable for indoor air quality.

=== Prevention and treatment ===
There are strategies to prevent water infiltration due to humidity into structures, as well as ways to treat human occupancy practices regarding humidity. Vapor retarders are materials that can be used to restrain uncontrolled airflow and water vapor into an indoor space. Vapor retarders are used to decrease the rate and amount of water vapor diffusion through ceilings, walls, and floors caused by humidity. It is made of thin, flexible materials and its coatings can be installed by trowels or brushes. Utilizing vapor retarders in a building prevents structural dampness from occurring or continuing if it already exists. A strategy for reducing humidity levels in an indoor environment is by altering occupant activity and indoor mechanics. Kitchens and bathrooms need to have their own vents. Additionally, washing machines need to be vented outdoors. Both of these are important in order to decrease indoor moisture due to humidity caused by the activities occurring in these indoor spaces. Moisture sources, such as hot tubs or indoor swimming pools, should be covered by airtight lids when not in use, so humidity levels stay low in the indoor environment.

== Condensation ==
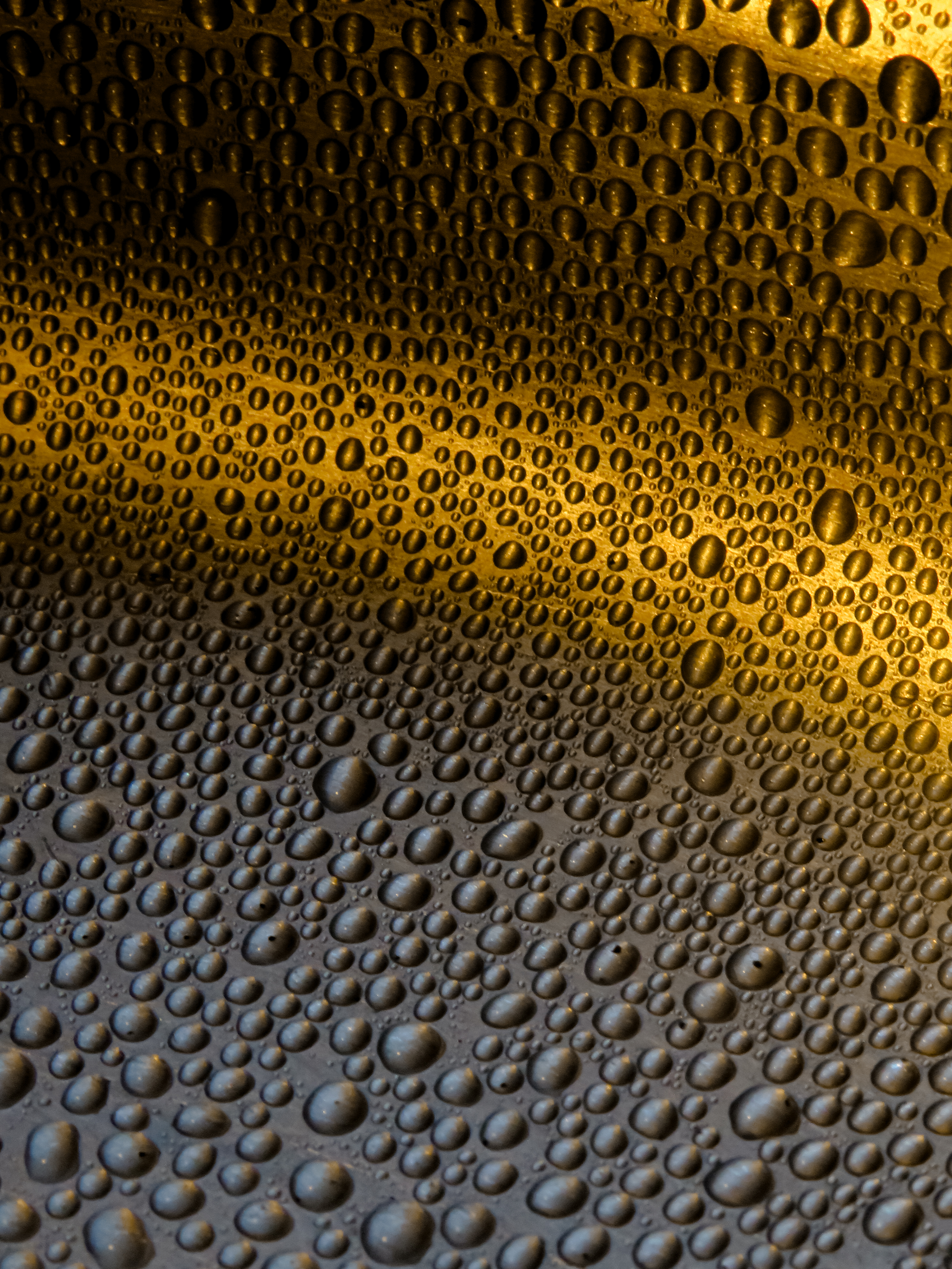
Water from condensation

Surface condensation occurs when air meets colder surfaces which are below the dew point, causing moisture held in the air drop out of suspension. This can occur on any surface such as ceilings, windows and walls, and the moisture settling on the surface is known as condensation. It is one of the causes of damp, which can lead to mold problems, including black mold. Condensation can be caused by insufficient heating and ventilation, if a property is too cold, by excessive moisture created by factors such as over-occupancy and normal day to day activities (like drying clothes or cooking), and incomplete insulation. It is often found in property areas such as kitchens and bathrooms where moisture levels are highest, on un-insulated solid floors, on solid external walls and on cold bridges (for example concrete lintels in cavity walls).

Interstitial condensation differs from surface condensation and is created by warm air going through surfaces and walls, where the temperature decreases inside it, creating moisture. This is typically caused by humidity, poor ventilation and insufficient insulation. Condensation problems are more common in cold winter months.

=== Identification of condensation ===
Humidity cards or data loggers that can measure air humidity, air temperature, and surface temperature can be used to diagnose a condensation problem.

=== Treatment ===
Typical remedies for condensation include increasing heat and ventilation, improving the insulation of cold surfaces and reducing moisture generation.

== Rain penetration ==
Rain penetration (also known as "penetrating damp") is a common form of dampness in buildings. It can occur through walls, roofs, or through openings (e.g. window reveals).

Water will often penetrate the outer envelope of a building and appear inside. Common defects include:

- Roof defects such as faulty flashing, cracked or missing slates or tiles.
- Faults in the brickwork or masonry such as missing or cracked pointing. Porous bricks or stones.
- Missing or defective mastic around windows and doors.
- Blocked weep holes.
- Missing or defective trays in cavity walls.

=== Walls ===
Rain penetration is most often associated with single-skin walls, but can also occur through cavity walls - e.g. by tracking across wall ties.

Single-skin brick walls of standard thickness (9 inches) have been considered to provide inadequate resistance to rain penetration for many years, which is why cavity wall construction is now standard in the UK. The 1944 Housing Manual published by the Ministry of Works and the Ministry of Health stated that:

"The resistance to penetration of rain should not be less than that of 11-in. brick cavity wall, properly designed and constructed with attention to details at the heads and joints of openings. An unrendered 9-in. wall is regarded as substandard."

Whilst renders are often applied in an attempt to resist rain penetration, they must be maintained in good condition in order to fulfil this function. Even relatively small cracks in renders can allow rain penetration to pass into the underlying masonry. In his 1954 book The Restoration of Old Houses, Hugh Braun highlighted problems inherent in certain types of render that were widely used in the late eighteenth century and throughout the Victorian era:

"By the end of the eighteenth century a number of patent water-repellent cements were appearing on the market, the most popular of which, roman cement, continued in universal use throughout the Victorian era; many old buildings were rendered with this substance. Its adhesion was poor and it will often be found that it has become separated from the walling over considerable areas and can be stripped away in large sheets."

==== Primary causes ====
- Porous masonry (i.e. under-fired bricks, porous stone, or porous mortar)
- Cracks
- Defective pointing
- Unfilled joints and perpends
- Defective seals around doors and windows
- Holes in walls – e.g. where cables or pipes protrude
- Defective render
Primary Causes of Penetrating Damp
Cracks in render and masonry provide a pathway for damp to penetrate.

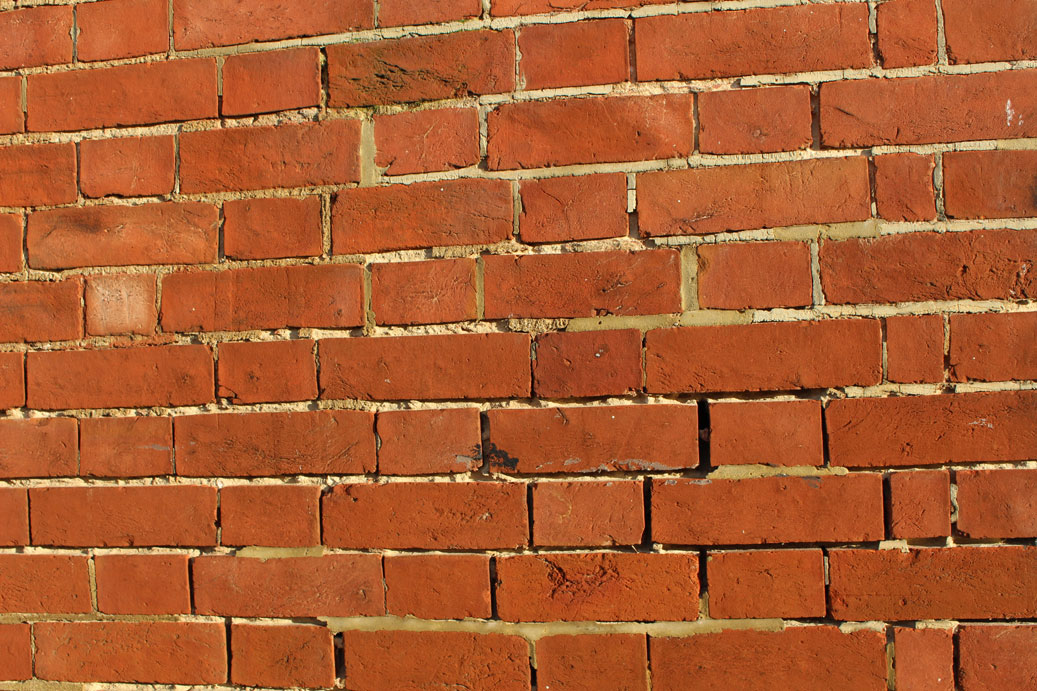
Defective pointing can allow rain to penetrate through masonry walls.

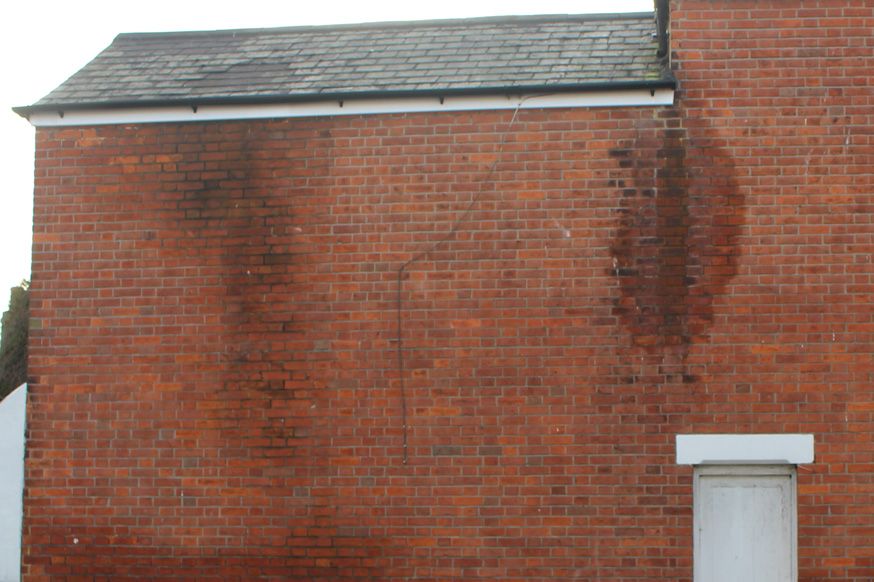
Porous bricks combined with poorly-maintained rainwater goods leading to penetrating damp.

Hole in brick wall provides a path for rain penetration.

==== Exacerbators of rain penetration ====
Where a wall suffers from one or more of the primary causes of rain penetration listed above, the problem can be made worse by one of the following exacerbators of rain penetration:

- Defective rainwater goods
- Moss growth on roof tiles (causing blockage of rainwater goods)
- Defective or missing window sills (causing high concentrations of rainwater to bear on section of wall below window)
- Non-breathable coatings such as acrylic masonry paints – especially where applied to a poorly prepared masonry substrate
- Location/aspect of wall – e.g. walls facing prevailing wind are more prone to rain penetration problems (see BS 8104)
- Periods of extreme rainfall – walls that are normally thick enough to prevent rainfall from reaching the inner face can be overwhelmed during periods of heavy, persistent rainfall

Modifications to a building involving impermeable materials can also exacerbate the symptoms of rain penetration by trapping moisture. This can be a particular problem with regard to the installation of retrofit external wall insulation (EWI).

== Health effects of structural damp ==
Health concerns around mold include infections, allergenic or immunological illness, and nonallergic illness. Asthma is also triggered by the sensitization of dust mites accruing humid, wet regions of a structure. Damp increases the risk of upper and lower respiratory symptoms, hypersensitivity pneumonitis, allergic rhinitis, eczema, and bronchitis. Another health effect associated with structural dampness is the presence of bacteria in an indoor environment. Bacteria require water to grow and multiply and certain species can cause disease in humans, thus the intrusion of water into an indoor environment can place the health of occupants at risk from bacterial infections. Water removal and drying of wet building materials within two days will likely prevent mold and bacteria growth, therefore reducing occupants' vulnerability to disease. Due to these health risks, organisations such as the World Health Organization issue guidelines on indoor air quality, damp and mold.

== Regulations ==
In the UK, 5.2 of the Building Regulations 2010 Approved Document C, "Site preparation and resistance to contaminants and moisture" requires that buildings should be constructed to resist rising damp, penetrating damp, and condensation. Similar requirements are also made in reference to floors in Section 4 of the document. The Homes (Fitness for Human Habitation) Act 2018 requires private landlords in England and Wales to ensure that houses that they rent do not have damp. Awaab's law was introduced in 2023 and regulates social housing providers response to dealing with damp and mold.

In the USA, building codes related to damp include the International Residential Code (R406), which contains provisions for waterproofing, moisture barriers and damp proofing buildings. The Australian National Construction Codes provide provisions to help to ensure damp is mitigated.

== Rising damp ==
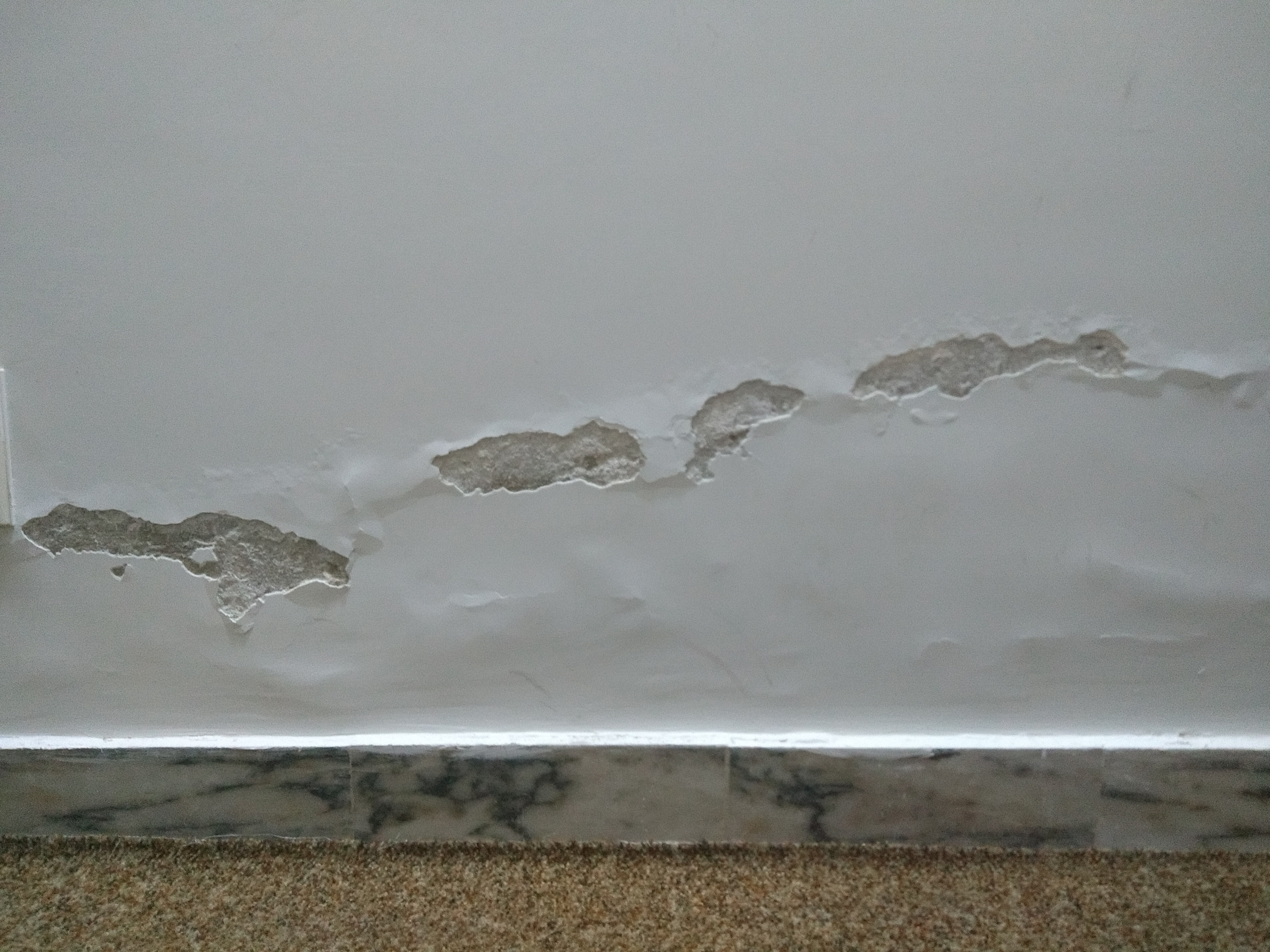
Moderate rising damp on an internal wall

Rising damp is the common term for the transport of water in the lower sections of walls and other ground-supported structures by capillary action in porous materials. Rising damp is a worldwide problem, that causes buildings to deteriorate. It is prevalent in old buildings.

Although rising damp of up to 5 metres (16 ft) in height has been observed the height of rise is typically much lower and is rarely above 1.5 metres (4.9 ft). Rising damp has been a widely observed phenomenon for at least two hundred years. There is also strong evidence to suggest that it was a problem understood by the Romans and Ancient Greeks. In common with most other forms of dampness, rising damp is often misdiagnosed in buildings. Many misdiagnose a wall stain as an instance of rising damp, due to misinterpreting the visual evidence of the wall and the readings of moisture meters.

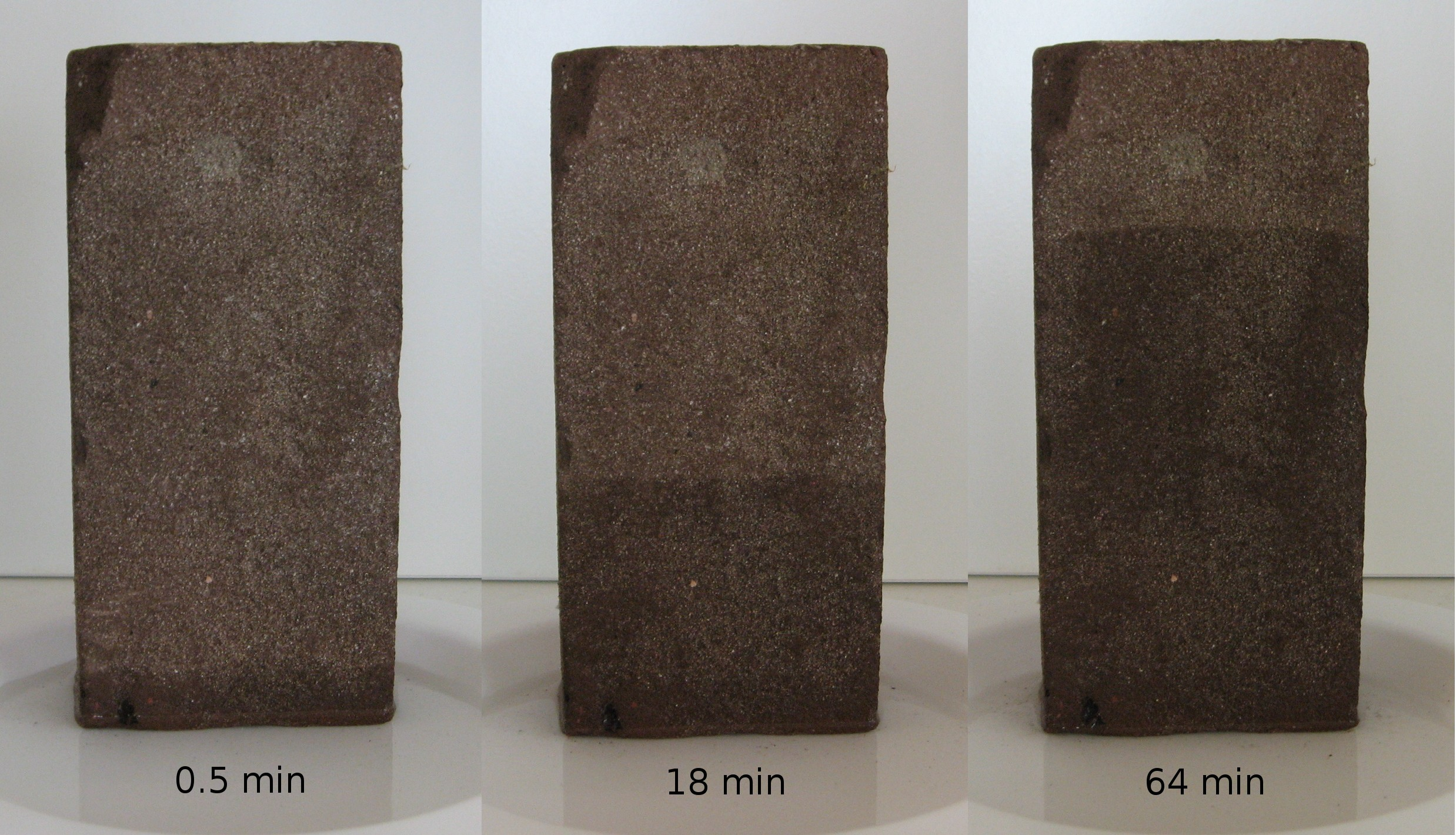
Effect of placing a porous brick in a shallow tray of water

Rising damp can be identified by a characteristic "tide mark" on the lower section of affected walls. This tide mark is caused by soluble salts (particularly nitrates and chlorides) contained in the groundwater. Due to evaporation, these salts accumulate at the "peak" of the rising damp. Due to rising damp often being caused by moisture from wet ground, it is not common to find rising damp on floors above ground level.

=== History ===
Damp Houses – British Medical Journal – 25 May 1872

The issue of rising damp has been a concern since ancient times. The Roman architect Vitruvius referred to the problem of dampness rising up walls and advised on how to construct buildings to avoid the problem.

Rising damp is widely referred to in Victorian literature and the Public Health Act 1875 introduced the requirement for a damp-proof course in walls to prevent rising damp. An entry in the British Medical Journal from 1872 describes the phenomenon of rising damp as follows:

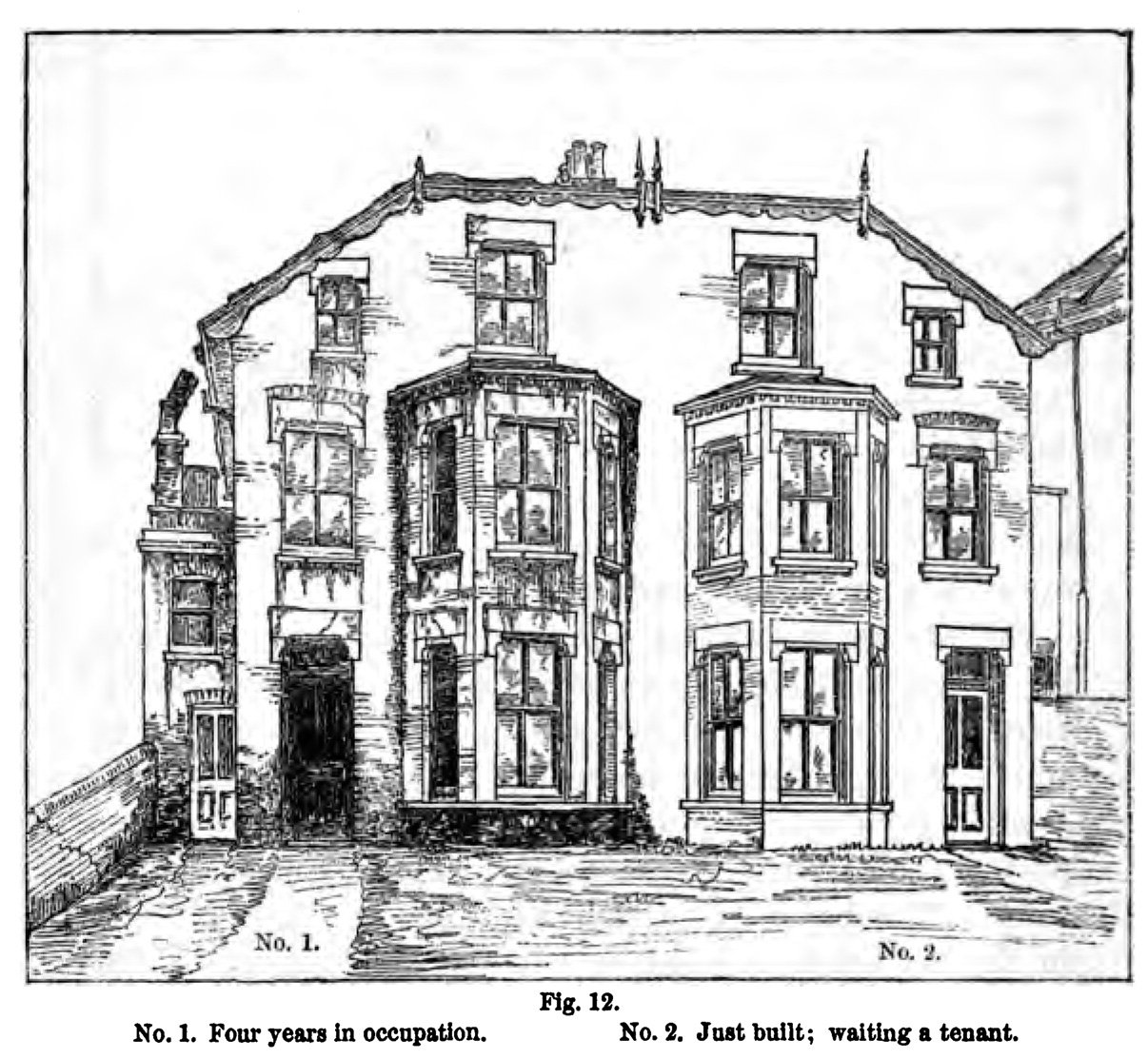
"Next we look, but in vain, for any signs of a damp proof course, or for any gratings to show that ventilation to the ground floor joists has not been forgotten. The results of the first two defects are visible enough in the house as it now exists, in the damp and green stains which are everywhere to be seen from the level of the ground to some two or three feet up the walls." Helps To Health, Sir Henry Burdett (1885), p. 138.

Even if the rising damp be arrested by what is technically called an impervious damp-proof course, it will be frequently found that this is built in the wall too near the ground line, so that the heavy rain besplatters the ground and splashes above it. As time rolls on the surface of the ground also becomes elevated, and this damp course is soon lost to sight. Attempts have been made to remedy this evil of porous bricks by the substitution of the hard blue bricks of Staffordshire; and then it may often be noticed that the wet has only struck, sailor-like, across the mortar-joints and chequered the inside walls like a tartan plaid.

In July 1860 it was reported in The Engineer that

At the Salford Hundred Quarter Sessions on Monday, it was officially stated by the Assize Courts Committee that the foundations which had been completed had been covered with asphalte by Messrs. Hayes and Co., of Liverpool, who guarantee that it shall withstand the rising damp.

The architect and social reformer, Thomas Worthington, described rising damp in his 1892 essay "The Dwellings of the Poor: And Weekly Wage-Earners in and Around Towns":

It should be borne in mind that damp walls absorb much more heat than dry ones and that they are frequent agents in causing rheumatism, kidney disease and colds. Rising damp from the ground may be prevented by most simple means. Six inches of good Portland cement concrete should cover the whole site of the dwelling, and concrete never less than nine inches thick should underlie all walls. A damp course should disconnect the whole of the foundations from the superstructure. This preventative may consist of a double layer of thick slates bedded in cement, or of patent perforated stone-ware blocks or of three-quarters of an inch of best asphalt.

In his publication "Helps to Health" (1885), the financier and philanthropist Sir Henry Burdett explains the need for an effective damp-proof course in order to protect against rising damp:

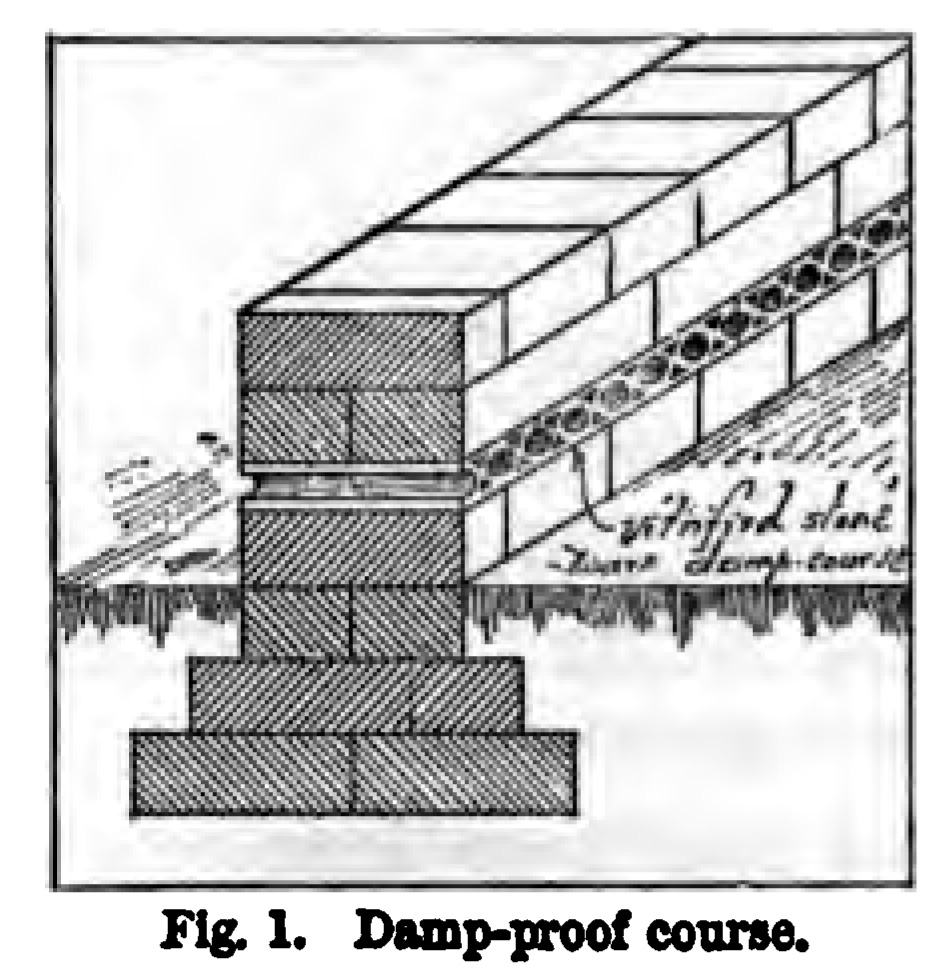
Vitrified stone-ware damp-course

Having thus taken care that the air and moisture shall have no chance of rising into the house from the ground beneath the floor, we must now turn our attention to the walls, which is equally necessary to protect from rising damp. If you plant a brick or stone wall on ground which is capable of retaining moisture, it will inevitably happen that unless you take means to stop its progress, the moisture will climb up the walls in obedience to the law of capillary attraction. The way to prevent this is to insert above the ground level but below the floor level, either a course of vitrified stoneware made on purpose, or two layers of slates laid in cement, or some equally effective impervious material, the intervention of which between two courses of brickwork bars will prevent the further upward progress of the damp (see figure 1).

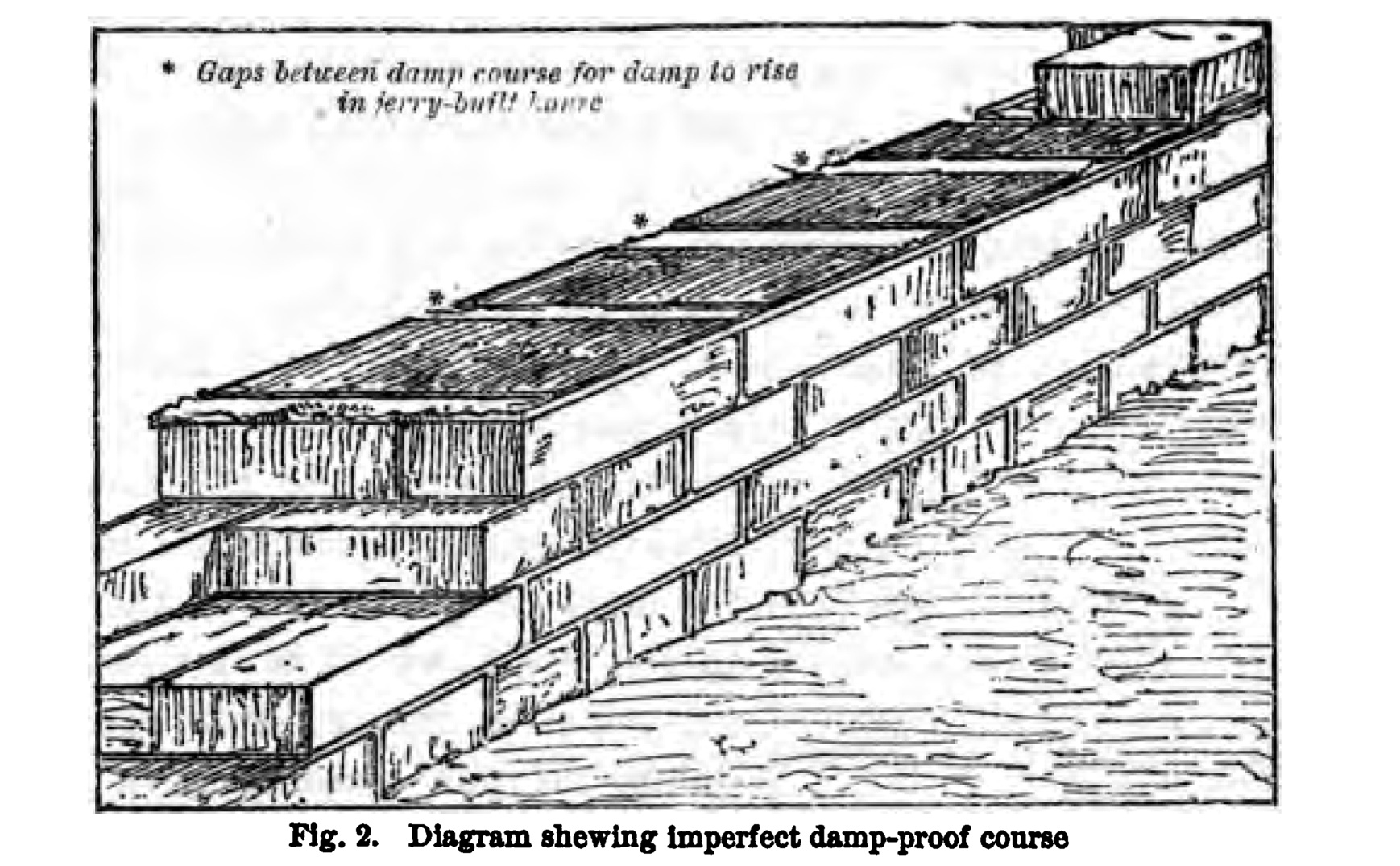
Gaps between damp course for damp to rise in jerry-built house - Helps To Health, Sir Henry Burdett (1885), page 124

Henry Burdett was deeply concerned with the quality building in Victorian England, and he cautioned would-be house buyers to check houses for the presence of a damp-proof course and to ensure that it is of an effective type.

As to the damp-proof course, however, it is possible by knowing what to look for, and where to look, to find out for a certainty whether there is or is not such a thing. Examine carefully the joints of brickwork between the ground and the level of the lower floor. A vitrified stoneware damp-course will be conspicuous from its perforations, and the difference in colour between it and the bricks. Asphalte or slates or cement alone will all appear, the two latter like mortar joints about three or four times the usual thickness. A favourite material with speculating buiders is tarred or asphalted felt, the presence of which can generally be detected by portions of it projecting from the wall. Its efficacy is, for all practical purposes, useless, and on no account should a Local Authority sanction its use.

As an example of poor workmanship leading to an ineffective damp proof course, Burdett cites the following example:

The damp course shewn in fig. 2, sketched from a house in Willesden, is a remarkable illustration of how not to keep the damp from rising. It is composed of one course only of ordinary roofing slates laid in mortar, with a space of at least an inch between each slate and the next one.

=== Skepticism ===
Rising damp is a phenomenon that is fully predicted by the laws of physics, has been researched on a worldwide scale, and has been documented since Roman times. Nevertheless, a small number of people have expressed the view that rising damp is a myth and that it is, in fact, impossible for moisture to rise from the ground into the wall structure through pores in the masonry. A former chairman of the construction arm of the Royal Institution of Chartered Surveyors (RICS), Stephen Boniface, has said that 'true rising damp' is a myth and chemically injected damp-proof courses (DPC) are 'a complete waste of money'. However, he has recently clarified this statement on a comment post made on the Surveying Property website:

Whilst I have often been quoted as stating "rising damp is a myth" the only time I have ever said that phrase (or similar) is once when delivering a paper at a conference and then using the intake of breath as a cue to then develop the argument further and explore the issue of damp. In other words, I used the phrase provocatively (it usually worked). I then went on to state that whilst I accept rising damp (as a term often used by the public and professionals alike) might exist it is indeed extremely rare. I have at other times referred to the myth of rising dampness and explained what I understand without actually stating myself that it is a complete myth.

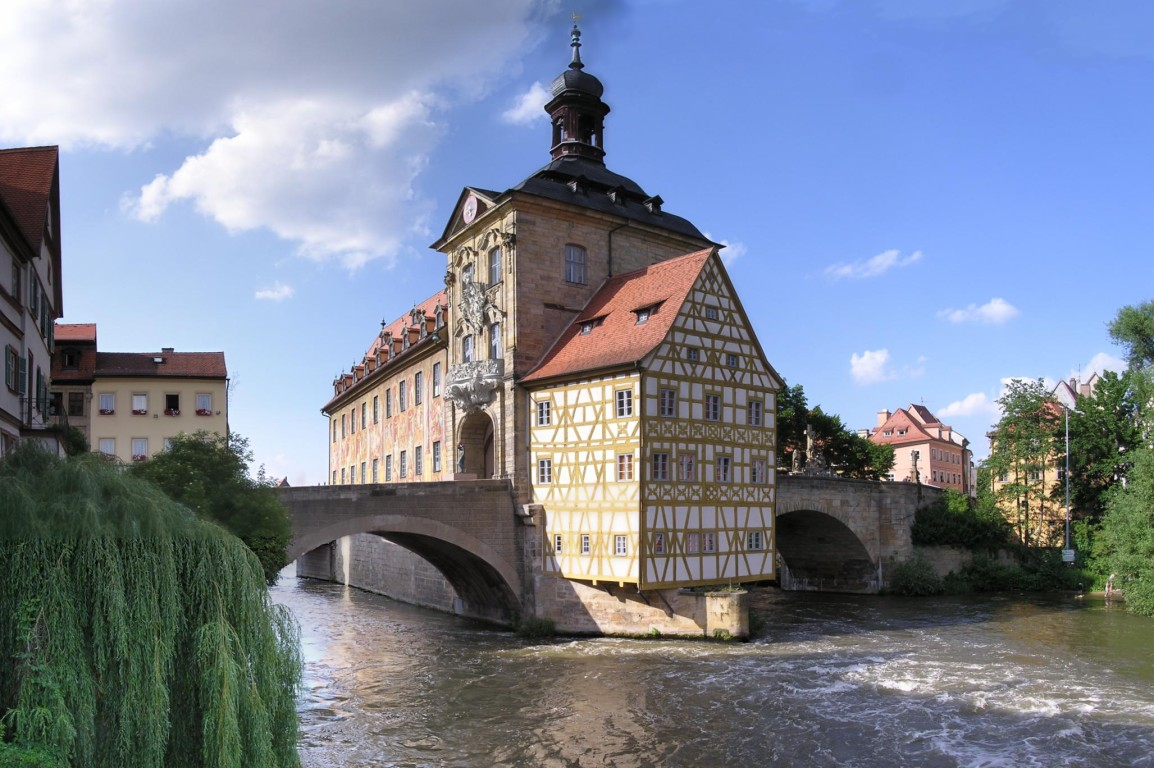
Bamberg town hall

Konrad Fisher's article "The Fraud of Rising Damp" points out that the historic town hall in Bamberg stands in the river Regnitz and its bridge remains dry without any chemical, mechanical or electronic damp-proof course. However, proponents of rising damp suggest that not all walls are capable of supporting rising damp, so merely observing that rising damp does not occur in a particular wall does not disprove its existence in other walls.

Water intrusion into the indoor environment can be attributed from causes other than rising damp. Moisture penetration has been an ongoing problem for residences as evaporation occurs at the edge of the damp area, resulting in "tide marks" due to salt deposition. The "tide mark" is commonly distinguished as a feature of rising damp. However, even after the water intrusion has been treated, these salt accumulations still persist.

The Building Research Establishment (BRE) in its review concludes that rising damp is a real problem.

=== How rising damp occurs ===
According to Jurin's law the maximum height of rise is inversely proportional to the capillary radius. Taking a typical pore radius for building materials of 1 μm, Jurin's Law would give a maximum rise of about 15 metres (49 ft); however, due to the effects of evaporation, in practice the rise would be considerably lower.

A physical model of rising damp was developed by Christopher Hall and William D Hoff in their paper "Rising damp: capillary rise dynamics in walls". The analysis is based on experimentally well established properties of porous building materials and the physics of evaporation from building surfaces. Hall and Hoff show that the model can be used to predict the height to which damp will rise in a wall. The height of rise depends on the wall thickness, the sorptivity of the wall structure and the rate of evaporation. Further work has confirmed experimentally the importance of mortar properties in determining the height to which damp will rise in walls. BRE Digest 245 lists several factors that can influence the height of the rise including rate of evaporation from the wall, pore sizes of the masonry, salt content of the materials and the soil, groundwater and degree of saturation, and use of heating within the property. The effect of seasonal variations in evaporation rate on the height of moisture rise have been comprehensively described.

A review of data and publications commissioned by the Property Care Association and carried out by the University of Portsmouth concluded that "Rising damp is an age-old and ubiquitous problem." It also noted that "Records on observation and descriptions on this phenomenon date back to early times. It was identified as a public health issue in the second half of the 19th Century." The review looked at data and studies on rising damp from a number of countries including the United Kingdom, Portugal, Germany, Denmark, the Netherlands, Greece, Australia, and Malaysia.

=== Diagnosis of rising damp ===
A wall affected by rising damp

The first step in assessing damp is to check for standing water. Removing water with good drainage will remove any form of dampness. Once done, and dampness remains, the next step is to look for the presence of a damp-proof course. If a damp-proof course is present, it is likely to be functioning, as the materials from which damp proof courses are manufactured tend to have a long lifespan. However, it should be acknowledged that there are cases where existing damp proof courses fail for one reason or another.

One indicator that is often used to determine if the source of dampness is rising damp (rather than other forms of dampness) is to look for the presence of salts – in particular a tell tale "salt band" or "tide mark" at the peak of the damp's rise. This is not a reliable method as salts and dampness can enter the fabric of the wall in other ways – e.g. unwashed sea sand or gravel used in the construction of the wall.

If there is no damp-proof course and rising damp is suspected (tide mark, moisture confined to lower section of wall etc. ...) then a number of diagnostic techniques can be used to determine the source of dampness. BRE Digest 245 states that the most satisfactory approach is to obtain samples of mortar in the affected wall using a drill and then analysing these samples to determine their moisture and salt content to assist in providing appropriate remedial building solutions. The fact that this technique is destructive to the wall finish often makes it unacceptable to homeowners. It is for this reason that electrical moisture meters are often used when surveying for rising damp. These instruments are unable to accurately measure the moisture content of masonry, as they were developed for use on timber, but the reading patterns that are achieved can provide useful indicators of the source of dampness.

=== Rising damp treatment ===
Where a rising damp problem is caused by a lack of a damp-proof course (common in buildings over approximately 100 years old) or by a failed damp-proof course (comparatively rare) there are a wide range of possible solutions available. These include:

- Replacement physical damp proof course
- Injection of a liquid or cream chemical damp proof course (DPC Injection)
- Damp-proofing rods
- Porous tubes / other evaporative
- Land drainage
- Electrical-osmotic systems

==== Replacement physical damp proof course ====
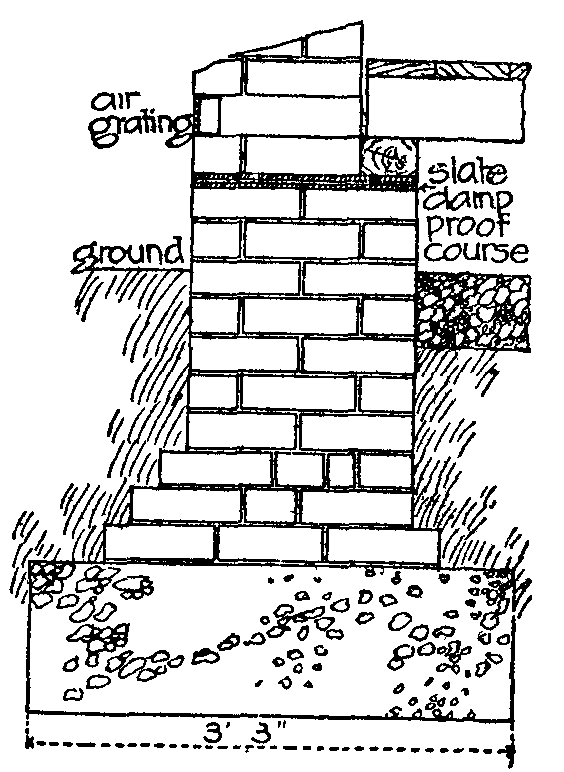
An example of a damp proof course of slate in a brick wall intended to prevent rising damp

A physical damp proof course made from plastic can be installed into an existing building by cutting into short sections of the mortar course, and installing short sections of the damp proof course material. This method can provide an extremely effective barrier to rising damp, but is not widely used as it requires experienced contractors to carry out if structural movement is to be avoided and takes considerably longer to install than other types of rising damp treatment. The cost is also several times higher than for other types of rising damp treatment.

==== Injection of a liquid or cream chemical damp proof course (DPC Injection) ====
Injection of a liquid or cream into bricks or mortar is the most common method of treating rising damp.

Adolf Wilhelm Keim describes the use of a hot bitumen remedial damp-proof course that is injected into holes drilled into a wall in his 1902 publication "The Prevention of Dampness in Buildings."

The Berlin "Bauhygiene" Association... has obtained very satisfactory results by the following method of preventing the rise of ground moisture:

"As low down as possible in the wall of the building, or just above the floorboards when there are cellars below them, holes are bored into the wall 10 inches apart. If the wall is a thick one, the holes should extend quite through it. The fire boxes with air-blast, already described, are then set to work on both sides of the wall, at the level of the bore-holes, until the brickwork is thoroughly heated and dried. In the Charlottenburg Palace this result has been attained with walls 1 metre (39 inches) thick. Whilst the brickwork is still quite hot, and therefore in a highly absorbent condition, pipes are screwed airtight into the holes, and by means of a force pump bituminous oils are forced into the dried stratum of the wall."

Even should this operation fail to produce an absolutely continuous damp-proof course in the wall - which depends on the structure of the mortar and the bricks - it is nevertheless in practice found that in all cases the hot wall absorbs sufficient of the material to prevent the rise of ground moisture.

Liquid-injection products were introduced in the 1950s and were typically installed using funnels (gravity feed method) or pressured injection pumps. The effectiveness of liquid injection damp proofing products is dependent on the type of formulation and the skill of the installer. In practice injection times tend to be lower than those required to provide a damp proof course of optimum effectiveness. A paper published in Building and Environment in 1990 made the following calculations about injection times:

The results of these calculations for a range of bricks and one building stone suggest that when high pressure injection is used the time of injection is unlikely to be less than five minutes per hole and may exceed 20 minutes per hole even for relatively permeable and porous materials. The times calculated for low pressure infusion of repellents range from 8 hours to 44 hours.

===== Damp-proofing creams =====
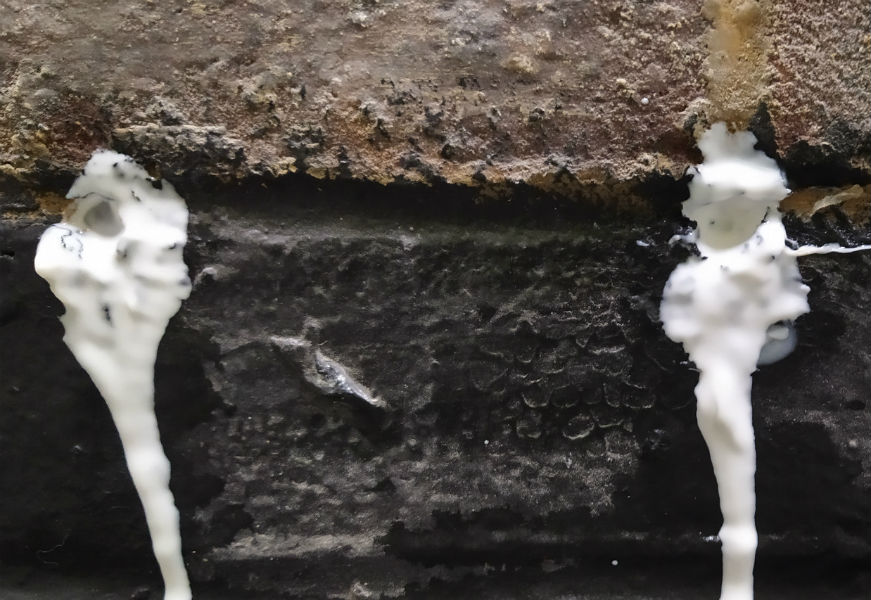
Damp-proofing cream leaking from injection holes. This can make it difficult to ascertain whether sufficient cream has remained in the holes for treatment to be successful.

Since the early 2000s, damp-proofing creams have taken over from liquid products due to improved ease of application. As with liquid products these are based on silane/siloxane active ingredients which line the pores of the mortar to repel damp.

The effectiveness of liquid and cream based rising damp treatments varies considerably between products due to variations in product formulations. Independent test certifications such as British Board of Agreement (BBA) certificates are available for some products, showing that they have met a minimum requirement for product performance.

As with liquid injection systems, cream based treatments rely on the competence of the installer for treatment to be successful. Injection holes need to be fully cleared of drill dust and debris before the cream is injected, and it is often difficult to know if each injection hole has been completely filled with cream. Furthermore, damp-proofing cream can sometimes drip out of the injection holes after treatment, reducing the effectiveness of the damp-proofing treatment.

==== Damp-proofing rods ====
A packet of damp-proofing rods

Damp-proofing rods installed along a mortar course to treat rising damp by forming a damp-proof course (DPC)

Damp-proofing rods use similar active ingredients to those found in liquid or cream-based rising damp treatments, but contained in a solid rod. They are generally considered to be easier to use than other types of rising damp treatment as the method of installation is simply to insert them into the correct sized holes drilled into a mortar bed. Damp-proofing rods are available with BBA approval.

The rods are placed into holes drilled in the mortar course and the active ingredients diffuse along the mortar line before curing to form a damp-proof course.

Damp-proofing rods are usually supplied in 180 mm (7.1 in) lengths suitable for inserting into a 9-inch thick wall. For treating half-brick thick (4.5 inch) walls, the rods are simply cut in half.

A benefit of damp-proofing rods compared with damp-proofing creams and liquids is that it is possible to guarantee a consistent dose of active ingredient into each hole drilled in the mortar course – i.e. it is impossible to under-fill the holes.

==== Porous tubes ====
Porous tubes are installed along a mortar course. In theory these encourage evaporation and reduce the rise of the damp. Independent test certification are available for this type of product and tests carried out by the Building Research Establishment suggest that they are effective at controlling rising damp.

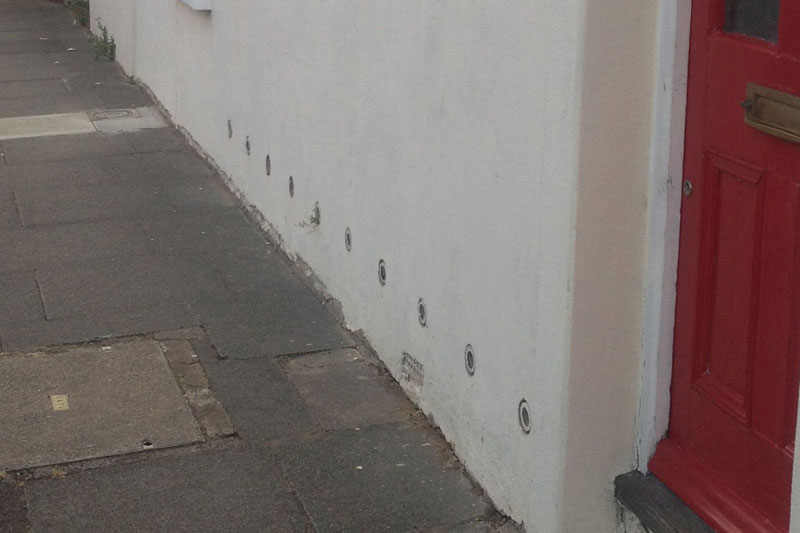
Porous tubes used to treat rising damp are visible on the outside of this Victorian house.

Porous ceramic tubes were an early technique to produce a method of combating rising damp; in the 1920s this technique was marketed by British Knapen. Tests were written up in the Building Research Station Annual Report of 1930: 'There have been tests to determine the effect on the rate of evaporation of moisture of inclined porous clay tubes set in specimens of brickwork and natural stone. Laboratory experiments and field tests have been carried out. Results indicate an increase of evaporation of moisture results from the use of these tubes.

==== Land drainage ====
It has been suggested that improving drainage around walls affected by rising damp can help to reduce the height of rise by reducing the amount of water available to be absorbed into the capillaries of the wall. Typically a trench would be excavated around the affected wall into which a porous pipe would be laid. The trench would then be back-filled with a porous material such as a single-sized aggregate, forming a French drain.

Such a system would obviously have the practical disadvantage of being suitable only for the treatment of outside walls and would be impractical where other buildings are close by or where a building has shallow footings. Although the theory of reducing rising damp by reducing the amount of moisture in the underlying ground would appear to be sound, there is little data to suggest that it is effective in practice. Indeed, G. and I. Massari stated in the ICCROM publication "Damp Buildings Old and New" that little effect was observed with "open trenching" and no effect was observed with "covered trenching".

==== Electrical-osmotic systems ====
These attempt to control rising damp through the phenomenon of electro-osmosis. While there is evidence to suggest that these systems can be useful in moving salts in walls there is little in the way of independent data to demonstrate effectiveness in treating rising damp. The BRE publication "Understanding Dampness" makes the following observations about electro osmotic systems for the treatment of rising damp:

There are two types: active and passive; neither has been approved by a recognised laboratory. By far the greater number of systems are of the passive kind, where there is no external source of electricity. They have always been something of a controversial issue. On theoretical grounds, it remains a mystery as to how they can work; their effectiveness has not been demonstrated in the laboratory and field evidence is disappointing.

=== Effectiveness of rising damp treatments ===
BRE Digest 245 suggests that with the exception of replacement physical DPCs, only methods of treatment with third party accreditation (e.g. British Board of Agrément Certificate) should be considered for the treatment of rising damp. It then goes on to state that the only method of currently satisfying this requirement is DPC injection (liquid or cream – although damp-proofing rods have subsequently been made available with BBA approval) and that "this is the only method which BRE considers suitable where insertion of a physical DPC is not possible."

The Royal Institute of Chartered Surveryors (RICS) publication "Remedying Damp" is more cautious about reliance on third party accreditation, casting doubt upon the validity of the test methods employed, arguing that trials are usually conducted using "specially built masonry panels – which do not match up in many respects to walls found in real properties," and that "if a DPC were proved to not work in a specially built masonry panel, this would be the more significant result." The MOAT No 39 test employed by the British Board of Agrément (BBA) in the UK is dismissed as "quite a clever test idea but in the author's opinion not actually replicating a real wall." The author, Ralph Burkinshaw, has developed his own test method which he has published under the title The rising damp tests of Camberwell Pier: Potential height of moisture rise in brickwork and the effectiveness of a modern chemical injection cream damp coursing application.

In April 2014 the British Board of Agrément confirmed that it would consult with manufacturers and holders of BBA certificates with a view to updating the MOAT No.39 test in light of the fact that it was not originally designed to test damp proofing creams and these have become the most popular type of rising damp treatment. This replaces a draft BBA guidance note that said Damp-proofing creams differ from fluid-based damp-proofing treatments in a number of ways:

1. Creams are applied at much lower application rates than is typical for fluid injection and are designed to spread through masonry by diffusion without the assistance of pressure injection. Owing to the number of different mortar types and moisture contents, it is necessary to test these materials under a wider range of conditions. Research undertaken by the BBA has indicated that the performance of creams differs with varying test conditions, with not all products performing well under all test conditions.
2. The amount of active material delivered per linear metre varies considerably between cream formulations. Injection systems were typically injected at an application rate of approximately 100g of active ingredient per linear metre of 275 mm (10.8 in) thick wall. However, because the strength of cream formulations used in the UK can vary widely, the applied amount of delivered active material varied from 22g to 107g per linear metre depending on product strength. As there is limited historical data on the durability of chemical creams with low levels of active material, it is difficult to draw conclusions on their life expectancy in comparison to high strength creams which have similar active material levels to injected systems.

In his book, Dampness in Buildings, Alan Oliver refers to research carried out in Belgium regarding the effectiveness of different types of rising damp treatments:

In Belgium, at the Centre Scientifique et Technique de la Construction (CTSC, 1985), research was carried out on the effectiveness of the main retrofit DPCs found in Europe. It was generally found that physical DPCs performed best, followed by the various chemical DPCs, with electro osmosis and atmospheric syphons being the least effective.

=== Replastering ===
Replastering will often be carried out as part of a rising damp treatment. Where plaster has become severely damaged by ground salts there is little argument about the need to replaster. However, there is considerable debate about:

1. The extent of replastering required
2. The use of hard sand:cement renders to replaster as part of a rising damp treatment

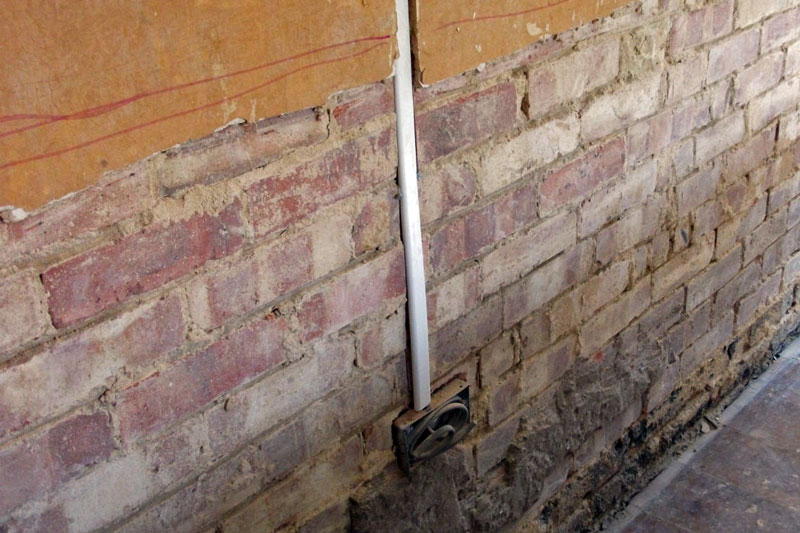
Plaster removed from a wall as part of a rising damp treatment. The wall was replastered using a sand-cement render.

BS6576:2005 states that "the function of the new plaster is to prevent hygroscopic salts that might be present in the wall from migrating through to its surface, while still allowing the wall to dry." However, writing in the RICS publication "Remedying Damp", Ralph Burkinshaw claims that, "the plaster is really there for two main reasons." He accepts the need for replastering when significant amounts of ground salts have built up in the existing plaster, but he then goes on to say that replastering is often carried out to make up for an unreliable chemical DPC. He also suggests that damp-proofers have an incentive to carry out more replastering than is strictly necessary as it allows them to finish the job without having to wait for walls to dry out, resulting in faster payment.

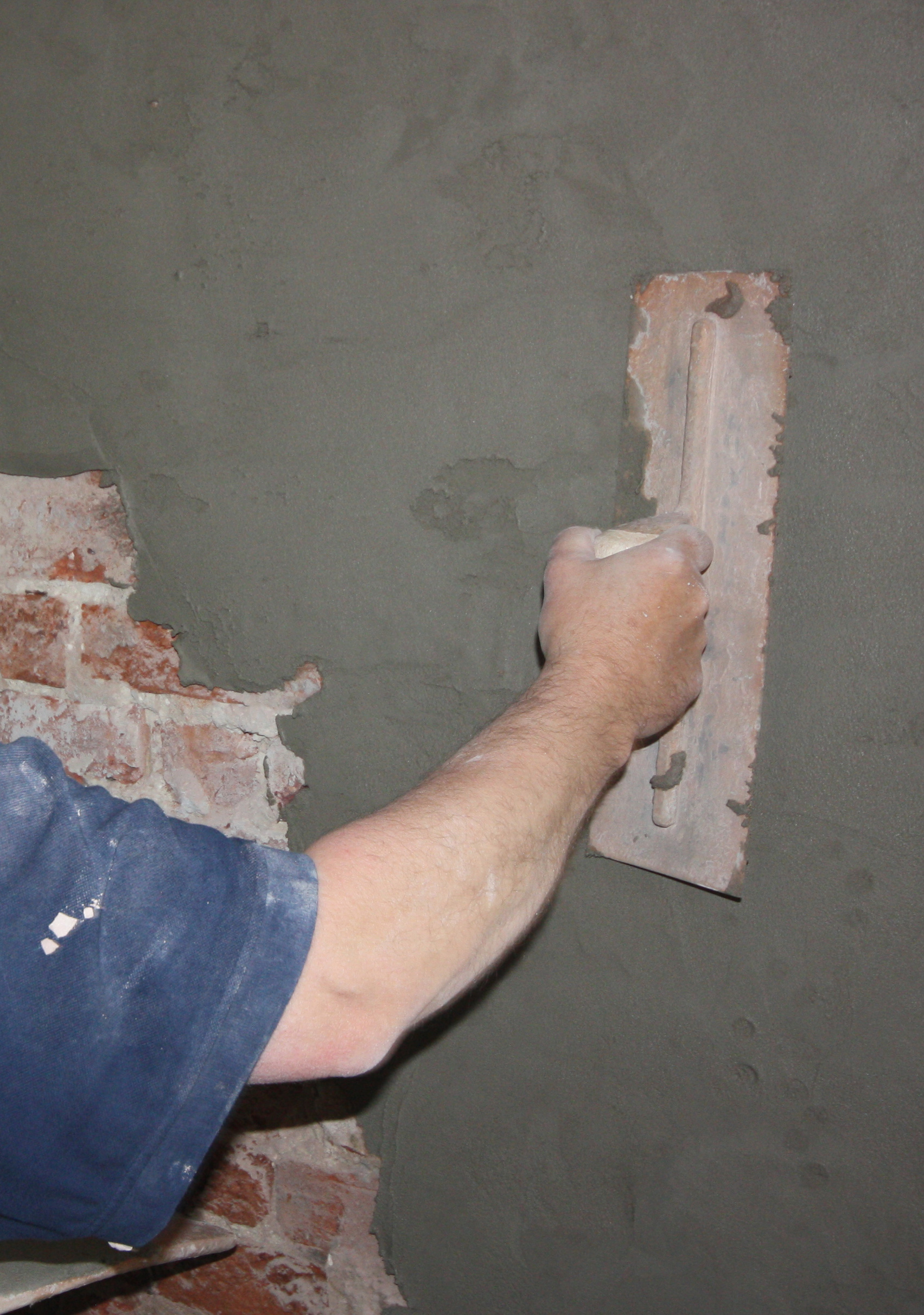
Application of a sand:cement render to a wall as part of a rising damp treatment

Although the sand-cement renders typically installed as part of a rising damp treatment are very effective at holding back damp and ground salts, they have a number of disadvantages. These include an incompatibility with the soft bricks and mortars encountered in older buildings and a lack of insulation properties compared with more traditional plasters, resulting in an increased risk of condensation. Replastering is also one of the most expensive parts of a rising damp treatment.

Porous renders to German WTA specification 2-2-91 can be used as an alternative to dense sand-cement renders. These have a minimum porosity of 40% of total volume. Salts crystallise in these pores rather than on the plaster surface, avoiding decorative spoiling. Such plasters offer a better solution than dense sand-cement renders when used on moderately salt-contaminated walls as their porous nature gives them insulation properties, resulting in a warmer surface temperature and making condensation problems less likely to occur. However, when used on heavily salt contaminated walls they may need to be replaced frequently as they lose effectiveness once all the pores have become filled with crystallised salt. The "Renovation Mortars" described in EN998-1:2003 are described as being designed for use on "moist masonry walls containing soluble salts." The performance requirements for these types of mortars are based on German WTA specification 2-2-91 but without the requirement for a minimum porosity of 40% of total volume.

More recently, systems have become available that allow plasterboard or insulation board to be used to replaster walls affected by rising damp. After the existing plaster has been hacked off the wall, a salt and moisture retardant cream is applied to the wall. The plasterboard is then applied to the wall using a salt/moisture-proof adhesive. Such systems have the advantage that they can be decorated straight away, rather than having to wait several days or weeks (as would be the case with standard plasters). They also provide a warmer surface that is less prone to condensation than would be the case with a standard sand:cement render.

Replastering may not be necessary where salt contamination is not severe. BS6576:2005 states that "Where the plaster appears to be in sound condition, the extent of plaster to be removed may be minimised by delaying any decision to replaster until the drying period is complete." Avoiding the need to replaster in this way can reduce disruption and mess and has the advantage of allowing the original lime or gypsum-based plaster to be maintained. However, the deficiencies of any remedial damp-proof course will be more apparent if the wall is not covered with a waterproof render. For this reason it is important to check the BBA certificate of the damp-proofing system to ensure that it is valid for use where replastering is not being carried out.

==== Redecoration ====
It is best practice to delay replastering and redecoration for as long as possible following rising damp treatment, but this obviously creates inconvenience to the occupants of the affected building. BRE Digest 245 states that "While the wall should be allowed to dry for as long as possible, replastering can follow, providing porous decorations are selected. These are usually matt emulsions and water-based paints, both of which will allow the wall to breathe. Application of gloss and vinyl paints or wallpapers should be delayed for at least one year."
