= Tie (cavity wall) =

Masonry technique

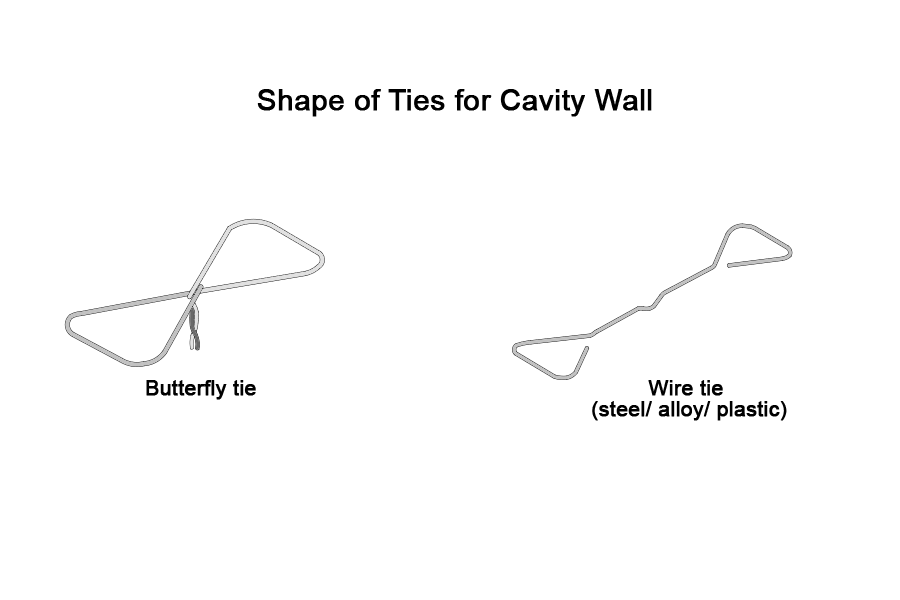
Cavity wall tie shape diagram

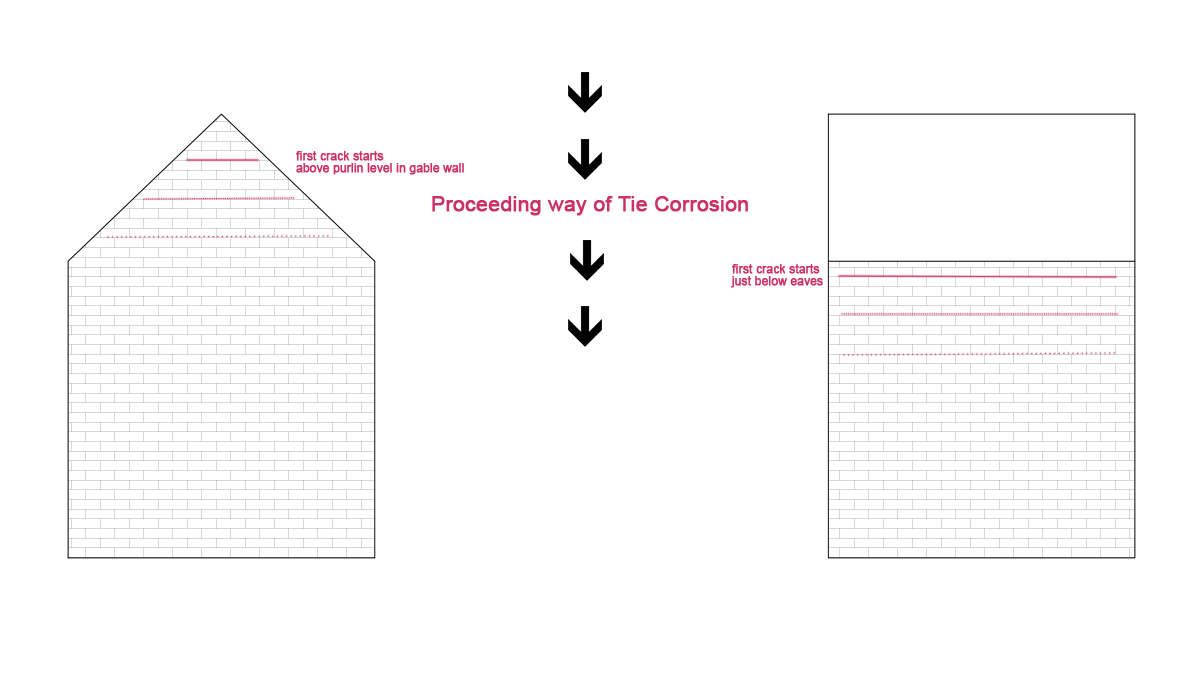
Proceeding way of Tie corrosion

The tie in a cavity wall is a component used to tie the internal and external walls (or leaves)—constructed of bricks or cement blocks—together, making the two parts to act as a homogeneous unit. It is placed in the cavity wall during construction and spans the cavity. The ends of the tie are designed to lock into the mortar. Also incorporated into the design of the tie is means of preventing water transfer from the outer to the inner leaves. In flat ties, this can be a twist. In wire ties, this can be corrugations formed in the wire or again a twist.

== Background ==
Cavity walls often have insulation in the cavity which may either partially or fully fill the cavity. Partial fill insulation systems require specialized ties or clips to keep the insulation in position. A vapour barrier may be necessary on the inner wall to prevent interstitial condensation. This is often incorporated into the cavity wall insulation system. The spacing of ties is laid down in building regulations, though there may be variations with specialised blocks. Additional ties are used around window and door openings. Improper installation may lead to water damage or fungus formation within the cavity, leading to structural and health hazards.

Ties are exposed to water and chemical attack from cement. They were traditionally made of galvanized steel, the fishtail tie being the most common. On high quality work, ties were occasionally made of bronze. In the mid-twentieth century, wire ties were widely used, again made from galvanized steel wire. As time has passed, many galvanized steel ties have deteriorated due to moisture in the outer leaf of brickwork. The corrosion may force apart the cement joints and even result in the collapse of walls if no remedial action is taken. Any cracks appearing in cavity walls dating from the twentieth century need to be investigated before irremediable damage ensues. Horizontal cracking is especially suspect. Failed ties have to be isolated and substitute specialist ties installed by drilling through inner and outer leaves from outside the building. The replacement ties may be fixed mechanically or with special adhesives.

Galvanized steel ties are no longer in use for this reason. For a brief period, plastic ties were used but were not satisfactory. Modern practice is to use stainless steel ties.

Cavity walls were traditionally spaced 2"(50mm) apart. Due to the need for thicker insulation in exterior walls these days, a range of longer ties are now available so that cavities of up to 6"(150mm) can be constructed.

== Types of ties ==
Ties in a cavity wall are typically made of iron, steel, or plastic; though figures are various. Basically, a tie has ring to fasten with mortar on both end like a bow. Ties would be selected by type of masonry, the cavity width, and so on.

Typically, ties in a cavity wall are double triangular shape (like a bow), though, depending on the existence of another layer (e.g. insulation sheet) at the cavity, which fills the cavity partially, ties include retaining discs or rods.

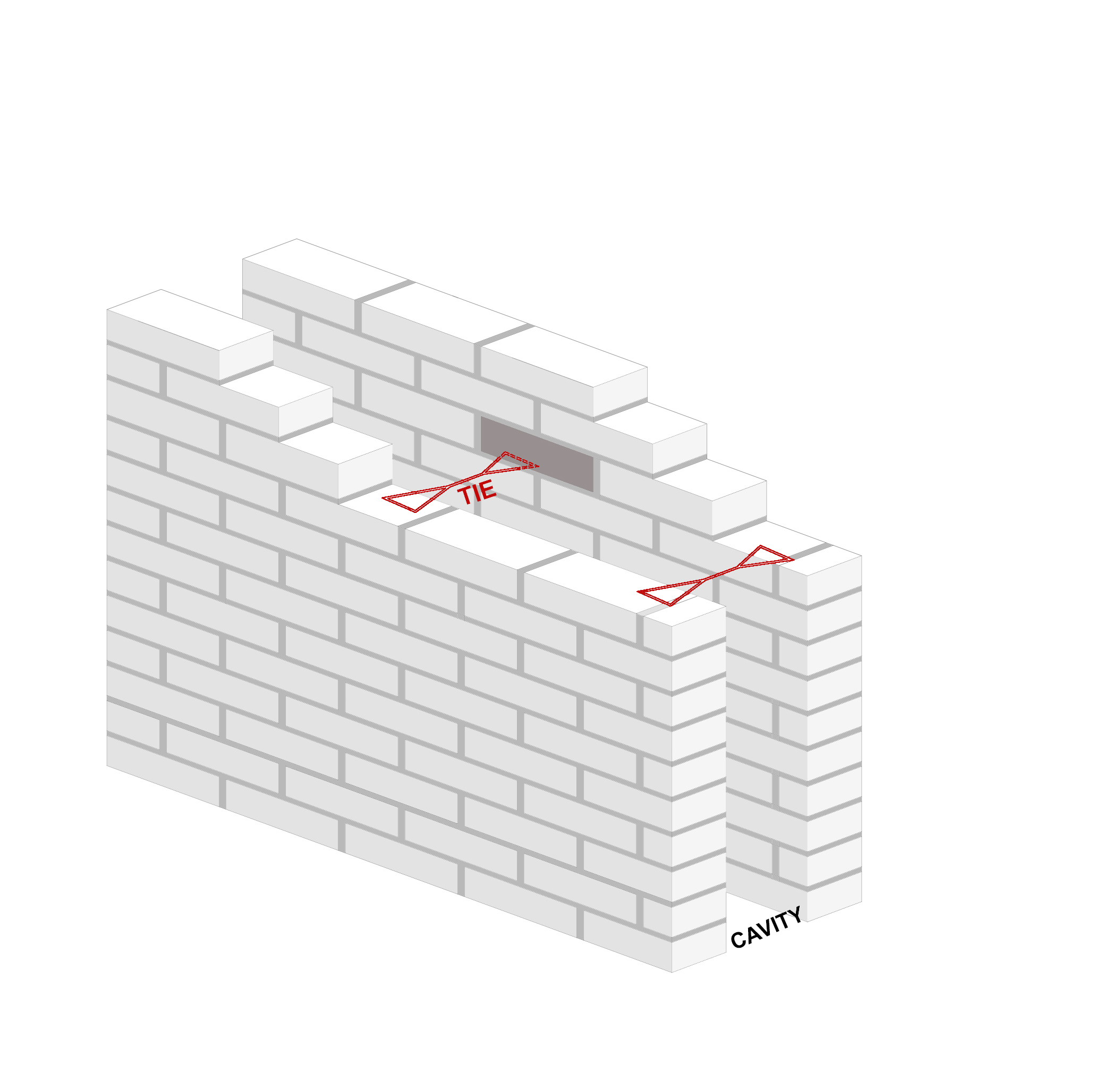
Cavity Wall Tie

== Tie failure ==
Failure of ties is an increasing problem with cavity wall ties made from galvanized steel. It arises when the galvanizing is not of sufficient quality and the outer leaf of the cavity wall allows water penetration, usually due to porous brick/blockwork. If the tie rusts, the swelling effect may cause horizontal, external cracks to appear in the wall. Frost action can swiftly enlarge these cracks to cause damage.

=== Tie corrosion ===
Since ties in a cavity wall are typically made of metal (iron or steel), they are prone to corrode over time. When metal corrodes, it expands its size, causing ties to lift up from the brickwork. Cracks caused by vertical loads leave parts of buildings vulnerable to corrosion, such as eaves and gable walls above purlin positions, or placed directly beneath openings, where the weight on brickwork is light. Over the time, cracks appear from the top of the wall and extend downward.

Cracks due to tie corrosion at the cavity wall are horizontal and tend to occur at the location of wall ties, normally 6 courses apart. The corrosion causes the walls to detach and tilt, resulting in the outer wall snapping outward. The inner wall is held in place by the added support of floor joists. At the gable wall, inner walls without these supporting joists, bow inwards. By avoiding several factors accelerating corrosion, it will last more than 60 years.

==== Acceleration factors of tie corrosion ====
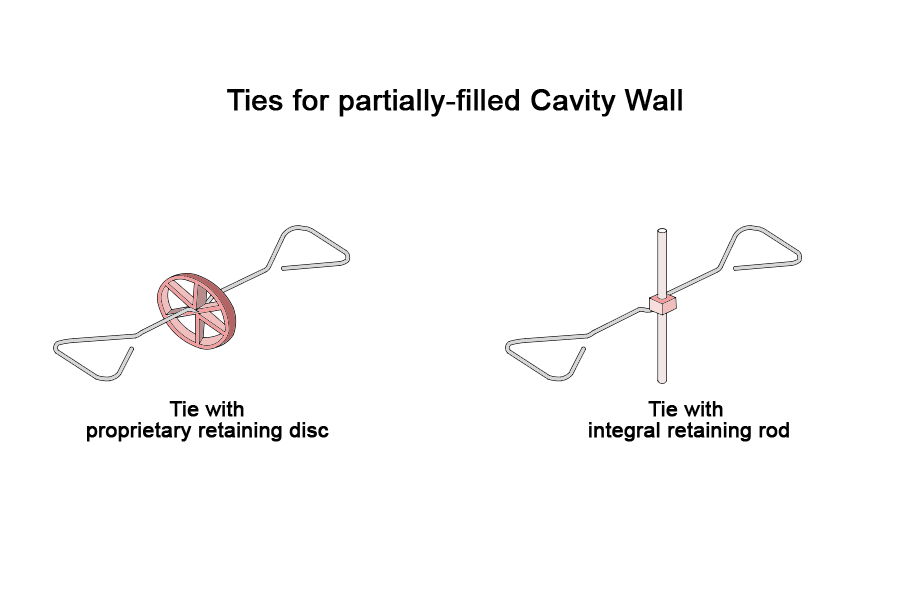
partially-filled Cavity wall ties

Due to its materiality of the tie, its corrosion is related to the extent of the exposure at acidic substances. The major factors of the corrosion are:

- Acidic black ash mortar
- Exposure (coastal or general)
- Coastal areas (salt in the atmosphere)
- Industrial areas (acid rain)
- Cavity wall insulation

Cement-based mortar, giving an alkaline environment for cavity wall ties, has been used since the Second World War. Alkaline environment is beneficial for ties protecting from acid and procrastinating the corrosion process. Before cement-based mortar, lime-based one was used, which does not present an alkaline environment. Therefore, the majority buildings with wall tie corrosion are built before the Second World War. An alkaline degree gets weaker while exposed at acidic rain over the time.

Moreover, metal corrosion is a chemical reaction that the reaction rate is triggered by water and heat. Thus, some say that cavity wall insulation enhance the ability to grab water longer, so that the environment of the ties damper. Accordingly, the South or South West elevations warmed by the sunlight are warmer, letting ties more at risk for this type of corrosion.

== See also ==
- Anchor plate
- Cavity wall
