= 't Hoeveke =

Historic farmhouse in Evere, Belgium

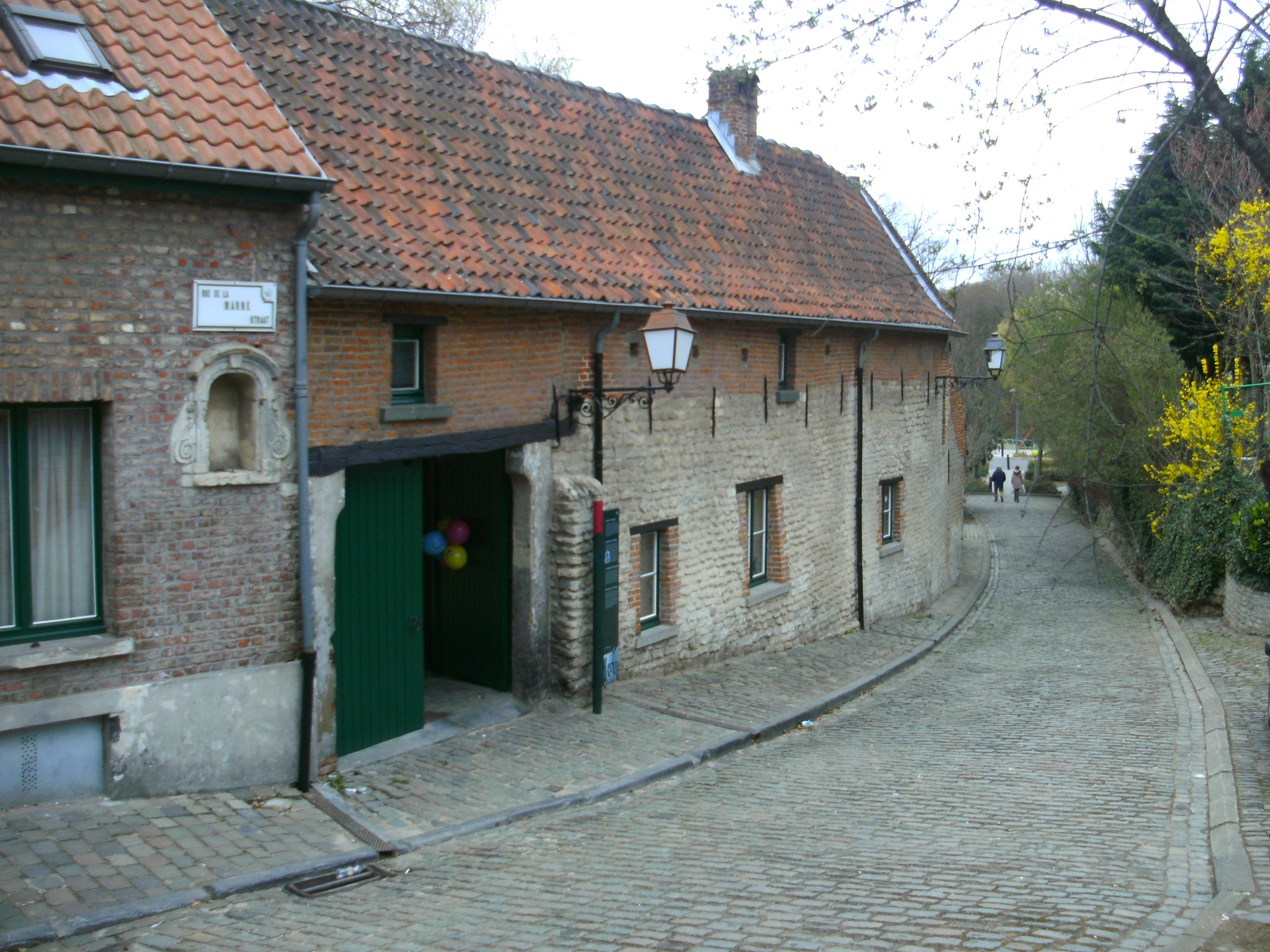
- 't Hoeveke seen from the Rue de la Marne/Marnestraat
- Interactive map of the 't Hoeveke area

General information
- Type: Farmhouse
- Location: Rue de la Marne / Marnestraat 1–5, 1140 Evere, Brussels-Capital Region, Belgium
- Coordinates: 50°52′35″N 4°23′48″E
- Construction started: 1638
- Owner: Municipality of Evere

Design and construction
- Designations: Protected (17/04/1997)

't Hoeveke is a historic farmhouse in Evere, a municipality of Brussels, Belgium. Built in 1638, it is the oldest surviving witness of the area's rural past and a remnant of a domain attested since the 15th century, which once housed the representative of the Duke of Brabant in the municipality. Altered in the 19th century and later restored by the municipality, the farmhouse has since been assigned a cultural function.

The building stands along the Rue de la Marne/Marnestraat, the former road to Cologne, following the curve of the old cobblestone route. Owing to its age, architectural features, and location, it remains an important place of memory for the community of Evere.

== History ==
The site of t' Hoeveke was part of a domain documented in the 15th century, which housed the representative of the Duke of Brabant in Evere. The present farmhouse was built in 1638 along the former road to Cologne, now the Rue de la Marne/Marnestraat, and originally comprised three dwellings for farming families.

During the 19th century, the main body of the farmhouse was removed and the property subdivided. In 1970, the three dwellings were merged into one space, and since 1975, the building has served as a community hall. 't Hoeveke was designated a protected heritage site on 17 April 1997 and later acquired by the municipality of Evere.

By 2011, the infrastructure no longer met modern standards. The building was restored, with its historic façade preserved and the interior adapted for cultural events. The renovation, completed in 2012 at a cost of €220,000, secured its role as a central cultural venue and lasting reminder of Evere's rural past.

== Architecture ==
=== Exterior ===
't Hoeveke follows the curve of the old cobblestone road. Its street-facing façade has preserved its anchor irons and is pierced by a large carriage entrance, emphasised by a sandstone buttress wall. This is followed by four windows, each with a stone sill, brick surround and wooden lintel, placed at different heights. Beneath the eaves, two small openings between the scaffolding holes provide light to the attic under a restored roof frame. The rear side of the roof is punctuated by four small dormer windows.

=== Interior ===
The interior of the farmhouse retains the character of a traditional rural construction. The attic is situated beneath a restored timber roof frame, while the annexe extending into the plot reflects the building's former agricultural function. Although remodelled during the 19th century, the interior still conveys the simplicity and utilitarian nature typical of farmhouses of the period.

== See also ==
- History of Brussels
- Culture of Belgium
- Belgium in the long nineteenth century
