= Cavity wall =

Type of wall with a hollow center

A cavity wall is a type of wall that has an airspace between the outer face and the inner, usually structural, construction. The skins typically are masonry, such as brick or cinder block. Masonry is an absorbent material that can retain rainwater or condensation. One function of the cavity is to drain water through weep holes at the base of the wall system or above windows. The weep holes provide a drainage path through the cavity that allows accumulated water an outlet to the exterior of the structure. Usually, weep holes are created by leaving out mortar at the vertical joints between bricks at regular intervals, by inserting tubes, or by inserting an absorbent wicking material into the joint. Weep holes are placed wherever a cavity is interrupted by a horizontal element, such as door or window lintels, masonry bearing angles, or slabs. A cavity wall with masonry as both inner and outer vertical elements is more commonly referred to as a double wythe masonry wall.

== History ==
Cavity walls were first used in Greco-Roman buildings, but fell out of use until the 19th century, when they were reintroduced in the United Kingdom, gaining widespread use in the 1920s. In the 20th century metal ties came into use to bind the layers together. Initially cavity widths were narrow and were primarily implemented to reduce the passage of moisture into the interior of the building. The introduction of insulation into the cavity became standard in the 1970s and then required by most building codes in the 1990s.

== Advantages ==
- Resist wind driven rain
- Thermal break provided by slow moving air films and airgap
- Enables use of insulation in the cavity if the cavity is designed for it

== Tie types ==
A tie in a cavity wall is used to secure the internal and external walls, typically using metal tie straps or truss-like assemblies of welded wire that link the masonry thicknesses together.

== Components ==
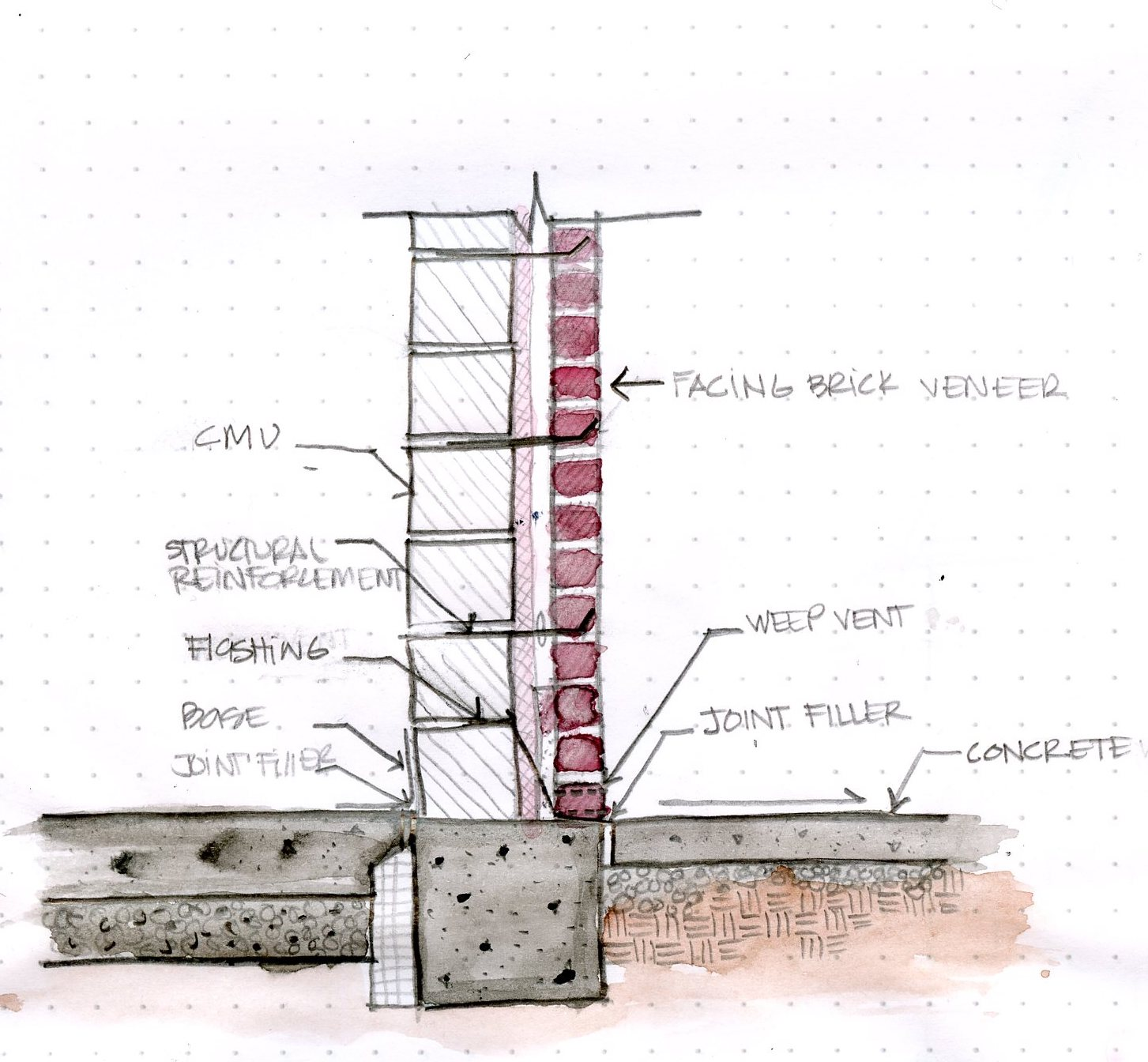
Components on a concrete masonry unit and brick cavity wall

A cavity wall is composed of two masonry walls separated by an air space. The outer wall is made of brick and faces the outside of the building structure. The inner wall may be constructed of masonry units such as concrete block, structural clay, brick or reinforced concrete. These two walls are fastened together with metal ties or bonding blocks. The ties strengthen the cavity wall.

The water barrier is a water-resistant membrane, either applied as a film or as a troweled or sprayed liquid to the inner side of the cavity.

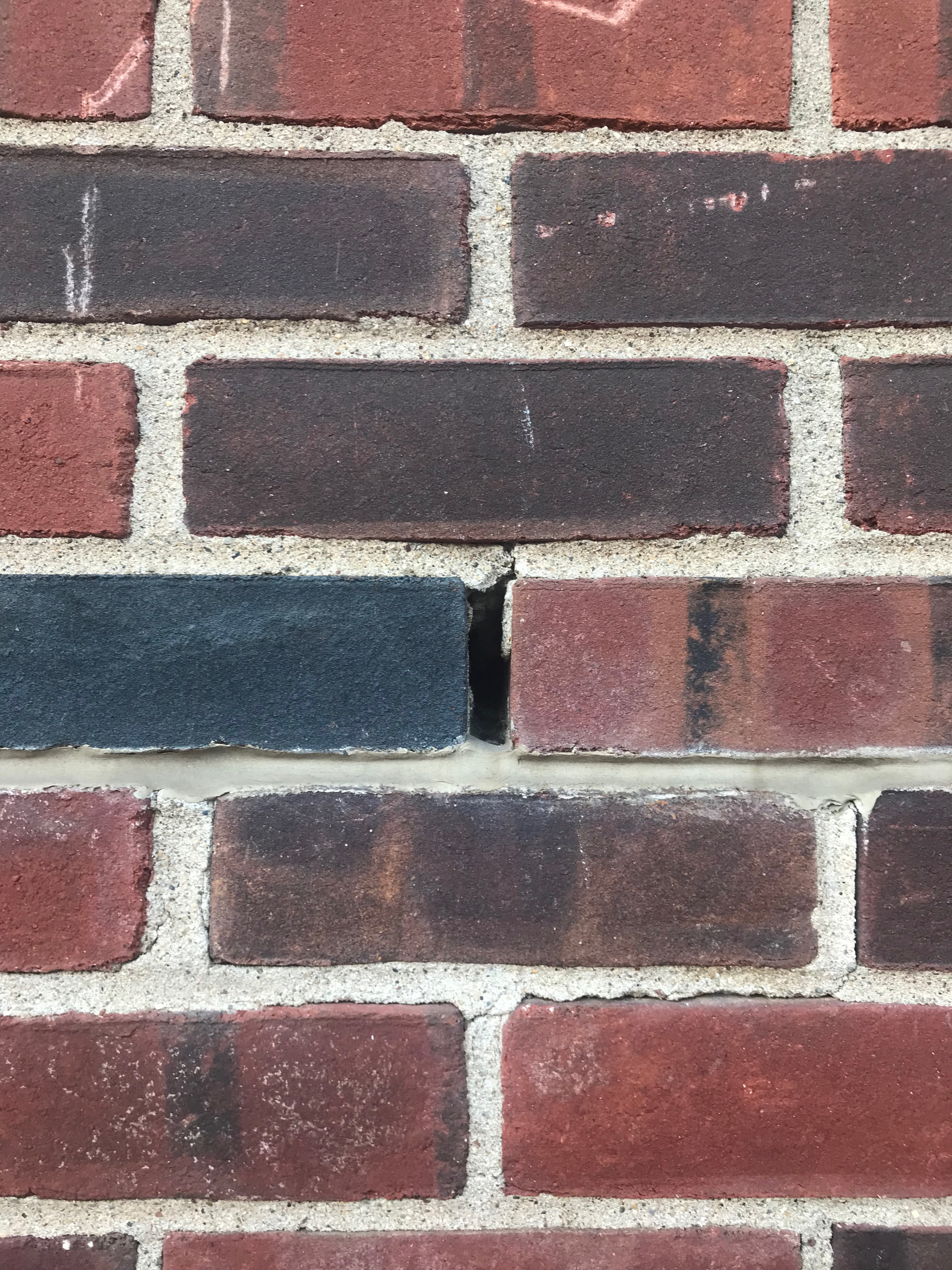
Weep holes in masonry wall

The flashing component is important. Its main purpose is to direct water out of the cavity. Metal flashing usually extends from the interior wall through the outer wall and a weep hole with a downward curve allows the water to drain. Flashing systems in cavity walls are typically located close to the base of the wall, so that it will collect the water that goes down the wall.

Weep holes are drainage holes left in the exterior wall of the cavity wall, to provide an exit way for water in the cavity.

Expansion and control joints do not have to be aligned in cavity walls.

In modern cavity wall construction, cavity insulation is typically added. This construction makes it possible to add a continuous insulation layer between the two wythes and, vertically, through the slabs, which minimizes thermal bridges. However, industry recommendations, often mandated by building codes, typically require that a cavity wall maintain at least a 1-inch (2.5 cm) drainage space free of masonry elements or insulation.

== Insulation ==
Cavity wall insulation is used to reduce heat loss through a cavity wall by filling a portion of the air space with material that inhibits heat transfer.

A wall that has had cavity wall insulation installed (after construction), with refilled holes highlighted with arrows

During construction of new buildings, cavities are often partially filled with rigid insulation panels placed between the two components of the wall

=== United Kingdom ===
In the United Kingdom, grants from the government and energy companies are widely available to help with the cavity wall insulation cost. The Affordable Warmth Objective (HHCRO) helps low-income and vulnerable households improve the energy efficiency of their properties and reduce heating bills.

Government-led research led to the development of advice on the installation of insulation, the definition of local rain exposure zones, and the creation of British Standard BS 8104 in 1992 that sets out the calculation procedure for assessing exposure of walls to wind-driven rain to guide the installation of insulation.

Many properties that had the insulation installed by successive UK government-backed schemes were installed incorrectly or were unsuitable for the property. Incorrectly installed cavity wall insulation (CWI) causes water to seep into a property's walls, causing structural problems and damp patches that may also manifest into mould. In some cases, the damp and mould resulting from CWI can cause health problems or exacerbate existing conditions, particularly respiratory conditions. This has led to the formation of the Cavity Wall Insulation Victims Alliance (CWIVA). On 3 February 2015, the CWIVA took the debate to the House of Parliament, discussing the cavity wall insulation industry.

=== United States ===
In the United States, cavity walls have emerged as a common element in contemporary brick construction, notably in New York City, where they contribute to improved durability and energy efficiency. Typically, a cavity wall features an exterior layer of brick, approximately one brick thick (about 4 inches or 10 cm), separated from an inner backup wall—commonly constructed from concrete blocks or steel studs clad with gypsum sheeting—by an air gap of roughly 1 to 2 inches (2.5 to 5 cm). This configuration reduces the volume of mortar required. It facilitates easier maintenance, rendering it more economical over time than the solid, multi-wythe brick walls prevalent in structures built before 1950. Bob Turzilli, president of architectural sales at Belden Tri-State Building Materials in New York, underscores the longevity of brick, remarking, "Brick has been used for thousands of years and there's nothing more stable." He further notes the aesthetic versatility of brick, stating, "You'll see red brick, light brick and even a combination of both, to complicate the issue," illustrating how cavity walls support a range of architectural designs while preserving structural stability.

== Issues ==
Breathing performance; early cavity wall buildings exchange moisture readily with the indoor and outdoor environment. Materials used for repairs must be selected with care to not affect the materials' breathing performance.

Cavity wall insulation installed in older buildings can create problems with moisture retention.

Thermal mass cavity walls are thick walls. These help stabilize the interior environment of a building better than thinner modern walls.

Environmental Influences: The orientation or design of a building may affect the performance of different façades on a building. Some walls may receive more rainwater and wind than others depending on their orientation or protection to some of the faces.

Moisture is one of the main problems in materials weathering.
