= Weep (architecture) =

Small opening that allows water to drain from within an assembly

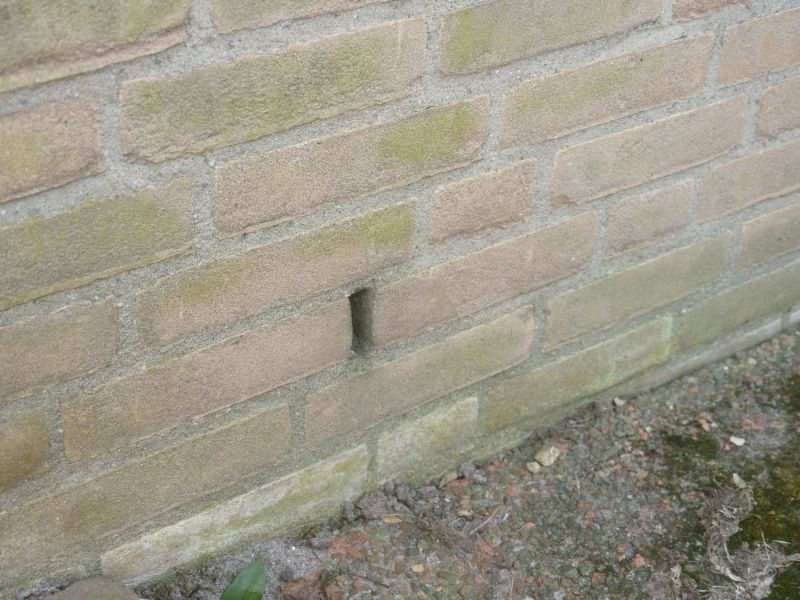
Weep hole

A weep, a weep hole, or a weep-brick is a small opening that allows water to drain from within an assembly. Weeps are located at the bottom of the object to allow for drainage; the weep hole must be sized adequately to overcome surface tension.

Weeps may also be necessary in a retaining wall, so water can escape from the retained earth, thus lessening the hydrostatic load on the wall and preventing damage to the wall from the excess water weight and possible moisture damage from freeze/thaw cycles. In such cases the weeps may consist of a plastic, clay or metal pipe extending through the wall to a layer of porous backfill.

Typically, weeps are arranged to direct water which may have entered an assembly from outside, back to the outside. Weeps may also be found in metal windows and glazed curtain walls to permit interstitial condensation to escape. Automotive water pumps have weep holes to protect the bearings by letting out water that leaks past the seal.

== Masonry ==
In building construction, weeps are typically found in a masonry veneer or cavity wall, just above the flashing. The cavity serves as a way to drain this water back out through the weep holes. The weep holes allow wind to create an air stream through the cavity. The stream removes evaporated water from the cavity to the outside. Weep holes are also placed above windows to prevent dry rot of a wooden window frame.

=== Open head joints ===
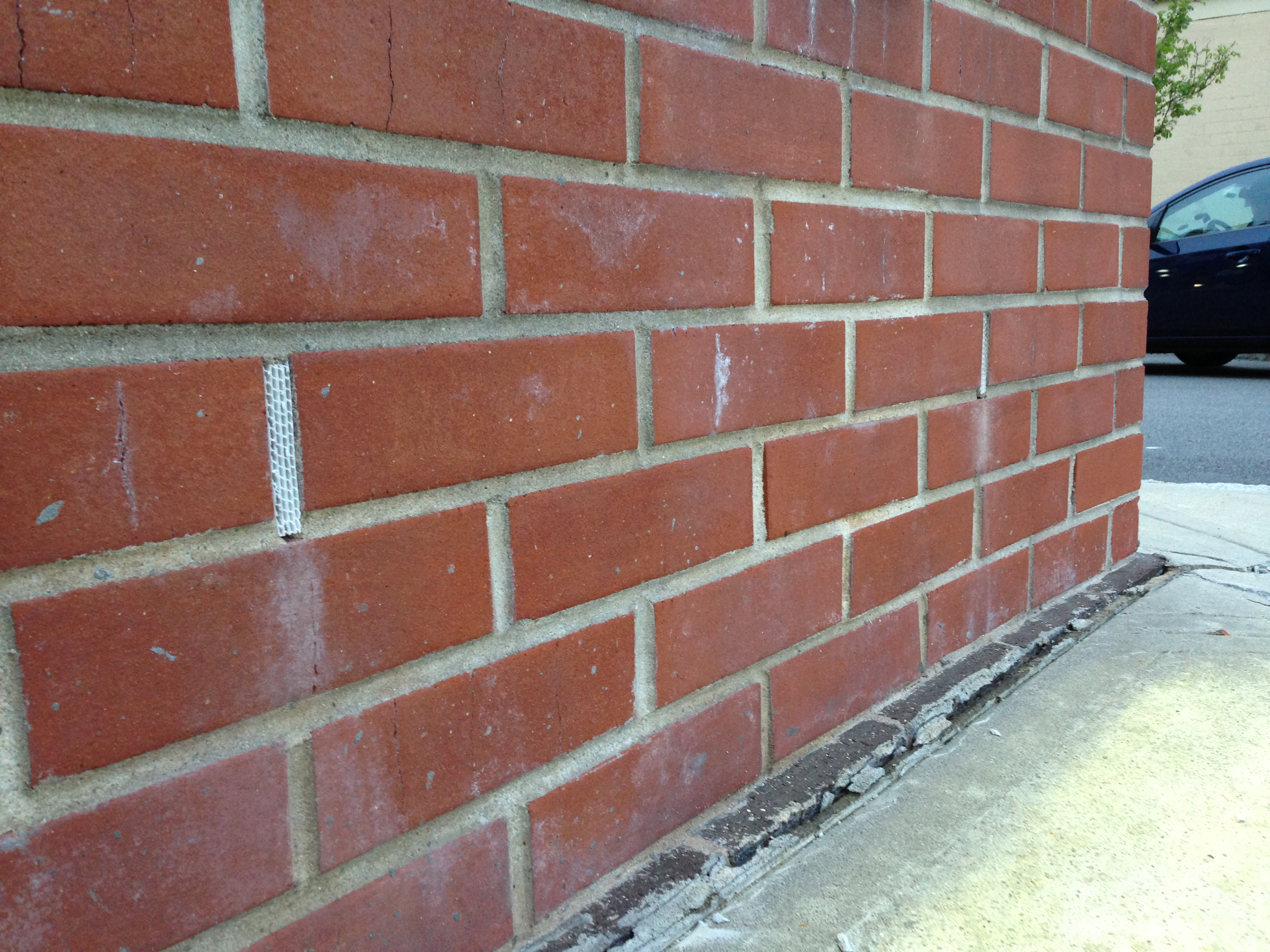
Weep holes with plastic grid inserts

The open head joint process is done by leaving out mortar from the joints. This create open holes of the same size of the typical spacing of the joints. This is the most common method and most effective way to evaporate water from the cavity. The spacing between open head joints can be done at every 24 inches (61 cm). One of the problems with this method is that the open head joints create large holes which may not be appealing. Some maintenance workers may also inadvertently patch those holes up without realizing they are weep holes. There are some products such as aluminum vent and plastic grid that can be inserted into the weep holes to make them less conspicuous.

=== Cotton rope wicking ===
Cotton wicks can be used to form weeps. A rope of up to 12 inches (30 cm) in length is placed in the joints. The other end of the rope is extended up into the cavity wall. The cotton can absorb the moisture inside the wall and wick it to the outside, but the converse is also true - it is possible for the cotton rope to wick a small amount of moisture from the outside to inside the wall. The process of evaporation is slower than with weep holes. Also, the cotton could catch fire.

=== Tubes ===
Another type of weep is a tube that can be made formed by using hollow plastic or metal. The spacing between the tubes is about 16 inches (41 cm) apart. The installation of the tubes are done at angle to allow water to drip out. If the angle is too steep, the opening hole inside the wall cavity will be too high for water to come out. If the angle is too flat, the mortar used in laying the bricks may drop into cavity and block the tubes. Sometimes a shallow layer of gravel is laid to prevent mortar dropping from blocking the tubes. The thickness of the plastic tube, however small, will create a small dam that allows water to pool inside the wall cavity.

Another technique to form tubes instead of using permanent tubing material is to use oiled rods or ropes. The oiled rod or ropes will be placed and mortared into the joints. The oil prevents mortar bond and the rods or ropes can be removed after the mortar is set, creating a hole similar to the use of a tube.

The advantage of the tube type is that it is less conspicuous. However, the small holes may not allow air to circulate and vent out the moisture very well.

=== Corrugated channels ===
A newer weep technology uses corrugated plastic to create weep channels/tunnels that form the bottom side of the bed joint of mortar. These tunnels rapidly conduct the water out of the wall through multiple weep hole openings and ensure that the water can exit at the lowest point in the wall. Corrugated plastic weeps generally blend into mortar and are less conspicuous than rope weeps.
