= Anchor plate =

Large plate or washer connected to a tie rod or bolt

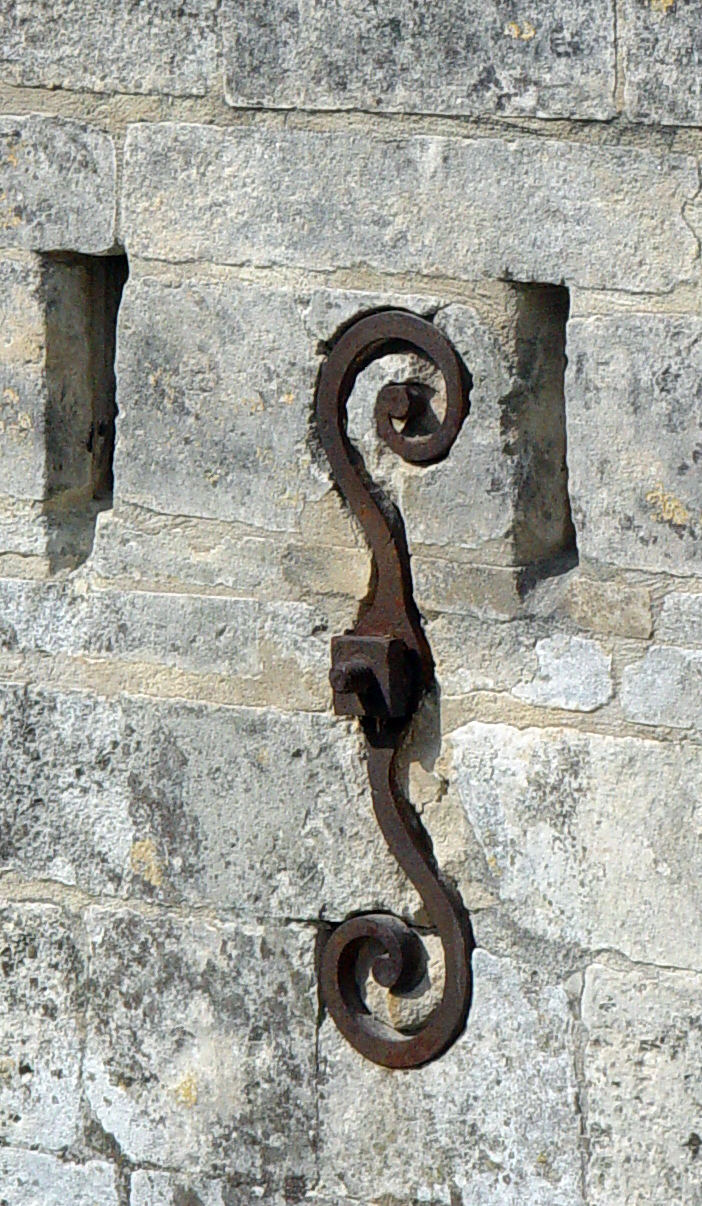
A stylized anchor plate in the cloister of the Church of St. Trophime, Arles (France)

An anchor plate, pattress plate, floor plate or wall washer is a large plate or washer connected to a tie rod or bolt. Anchor plates are used on exterior walls of masonry buildings, for structural reinforcement against lateral bowing. Anchor plates are made of cast iron, sometimes wrought iron or steel, and are often made in a decorative style.

They are commonly found in many older cities, towns and villages in Europe and in more recent cities with substantial 18th- and 19th-century brick construction, such as New York, Philadelphia, St. Louis, Cincinnati, and Charleston, South Carolina; and in older earthquake-prone cities such as San Francisco, as well as across all of Europe.

One popular style is the star anchor, an anchor plate cast or wrought in the shape of a five-pointed star. Other names and styles of anchor plate include earthquake washer, triangular washer, S-iron, and T-head. In the United Kingdom, pattress plate is the term for circular restraints, tie bar being an alternative term for rectangular restraints.

== Definition ==
According to the Oxford Dictionary of Construction, Surveying and Civil Engineering, an anchor plate "is a plate attached to a component that enables other components to be connected to it."

Although there are many types of anchors or anchorages, according to the Dictionary of Architecture and Construction, an anchor plate specifically is a "wrought-iron clamp, of Flemish origin, on the exterior side of a brick building wall that is connected to the opposite wall by a steel tie-rod to prevent the two walls from spreading apart; these clamps were often in the shape of numerals indicating the year of construction, or letters representing the owner's initials, or were simply fanciful designs."

While most types of anchors are made of only steel, anchor plates might also contain malleable or cast iron. The exterior wall washer is most often made of a cast-iron star or a flat steel plate.

== History of use and studies ==
In Roman technology, wooden tie-beams (or tie rods) were used between arches to negate the outward horizontal forces between them. Iron tie rods would later be used as a device to reinforce arches, vaults, and cupolas constructed across Medieval Europe.

In the modern era, tie-rods are made of iron or steel, and serve to reinforce vaults, arches, and in general masonry structures. Reinforced masonry walls are strengthened through a tie-rod that connects between parallel walls at the floor-level, which creates a horizontal compression state, thereby increasing the wall's shear strength. While the current literature is very poor, some studies have been done on analysis of anchor plates and tie-rods, for example one study dealing with concrete panels, which, although a thin veneer, may also need anchor plates to help stabilize the wall.

The pressure that an anchor plate provides is constantly stiff. A study found that, as widths exceed 100 millimetres (3.9 in), the advantage of having a wider plate decreased, indicating a width threshold for optimal support.

== Gallery ==
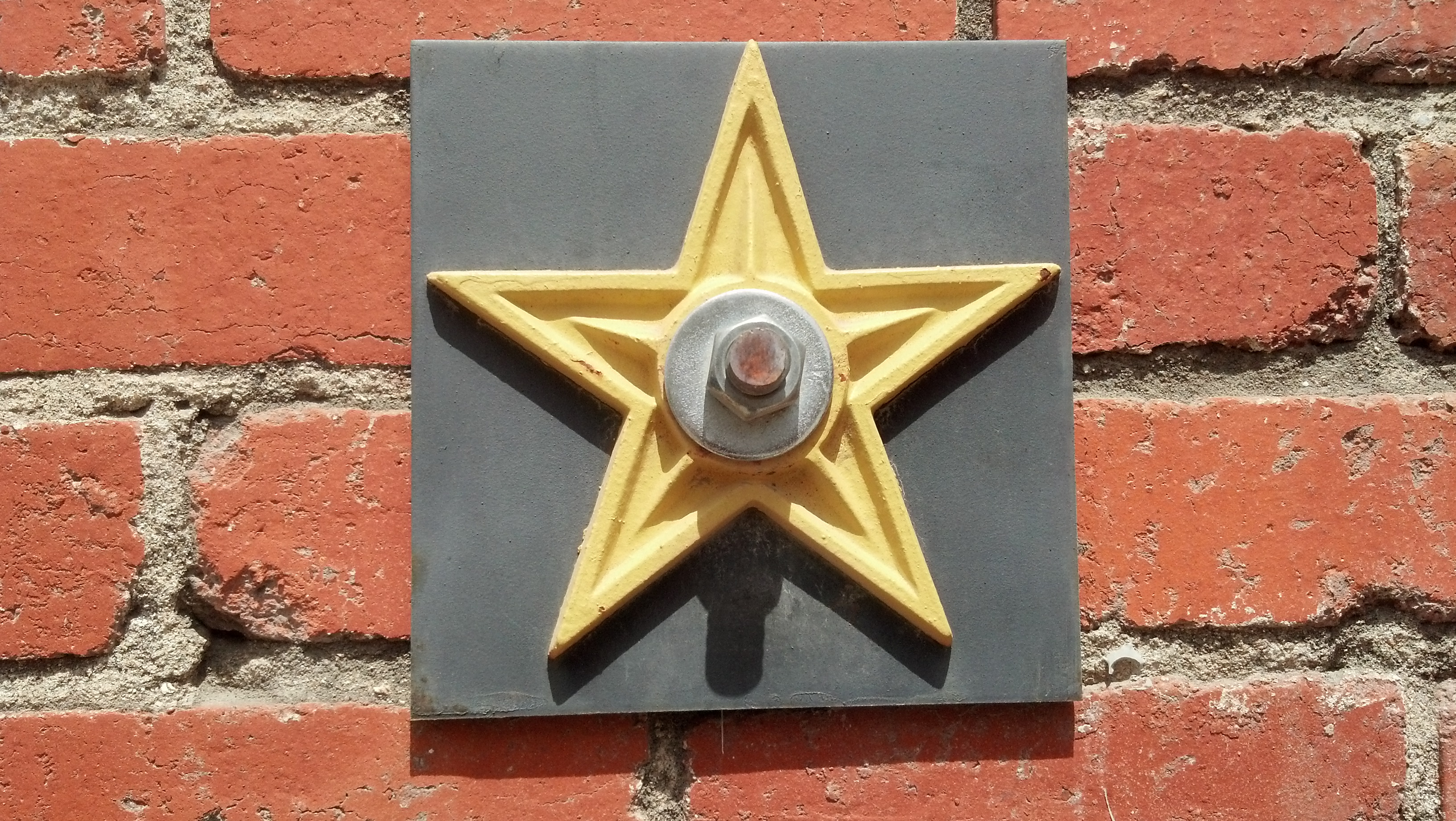
On a building in Petaluma, California

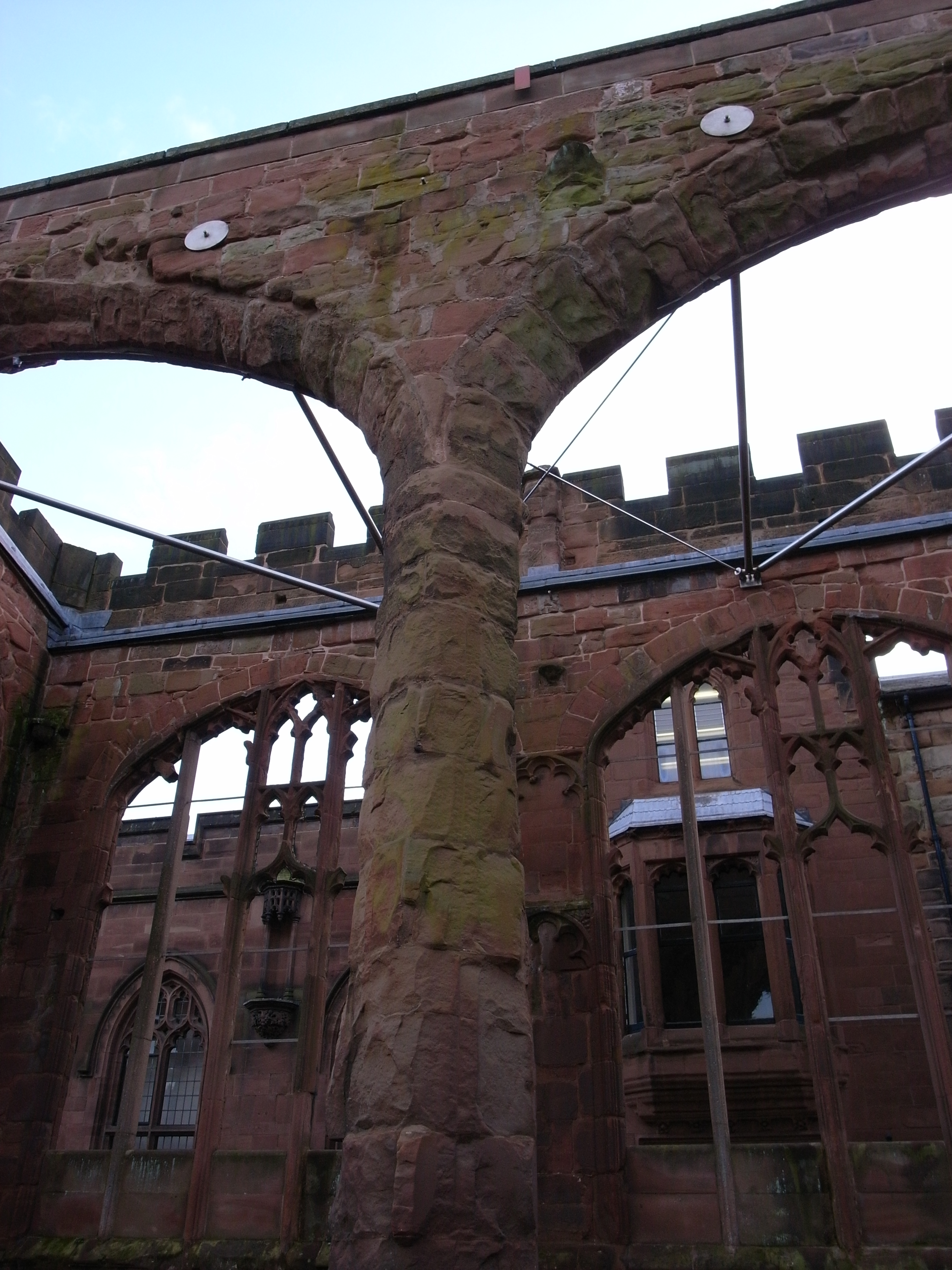
Tie rods and anchor plates in the ruins of Coventry Cathedral

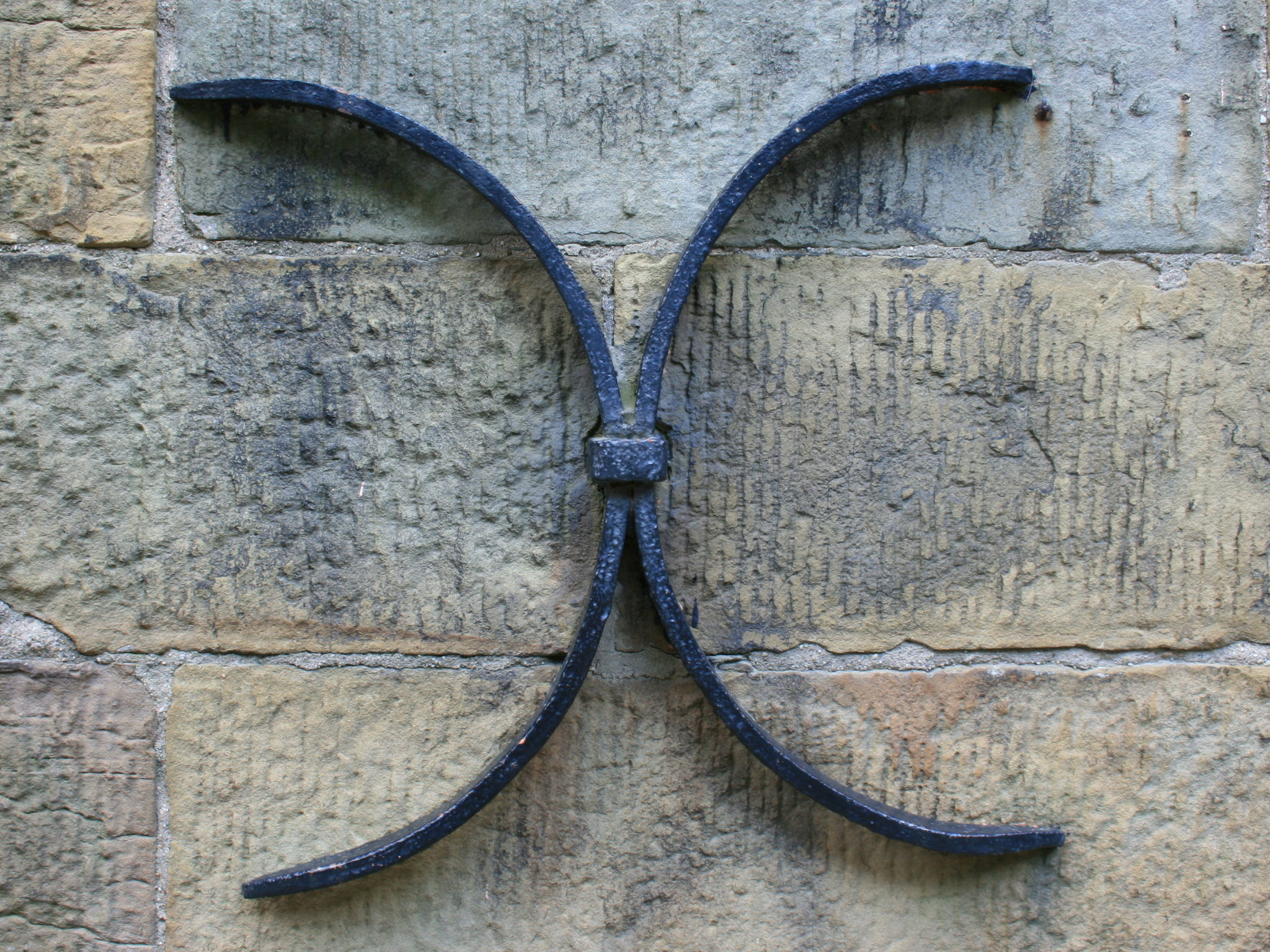
Anchor plate on a church in North Rhine-Westphalia

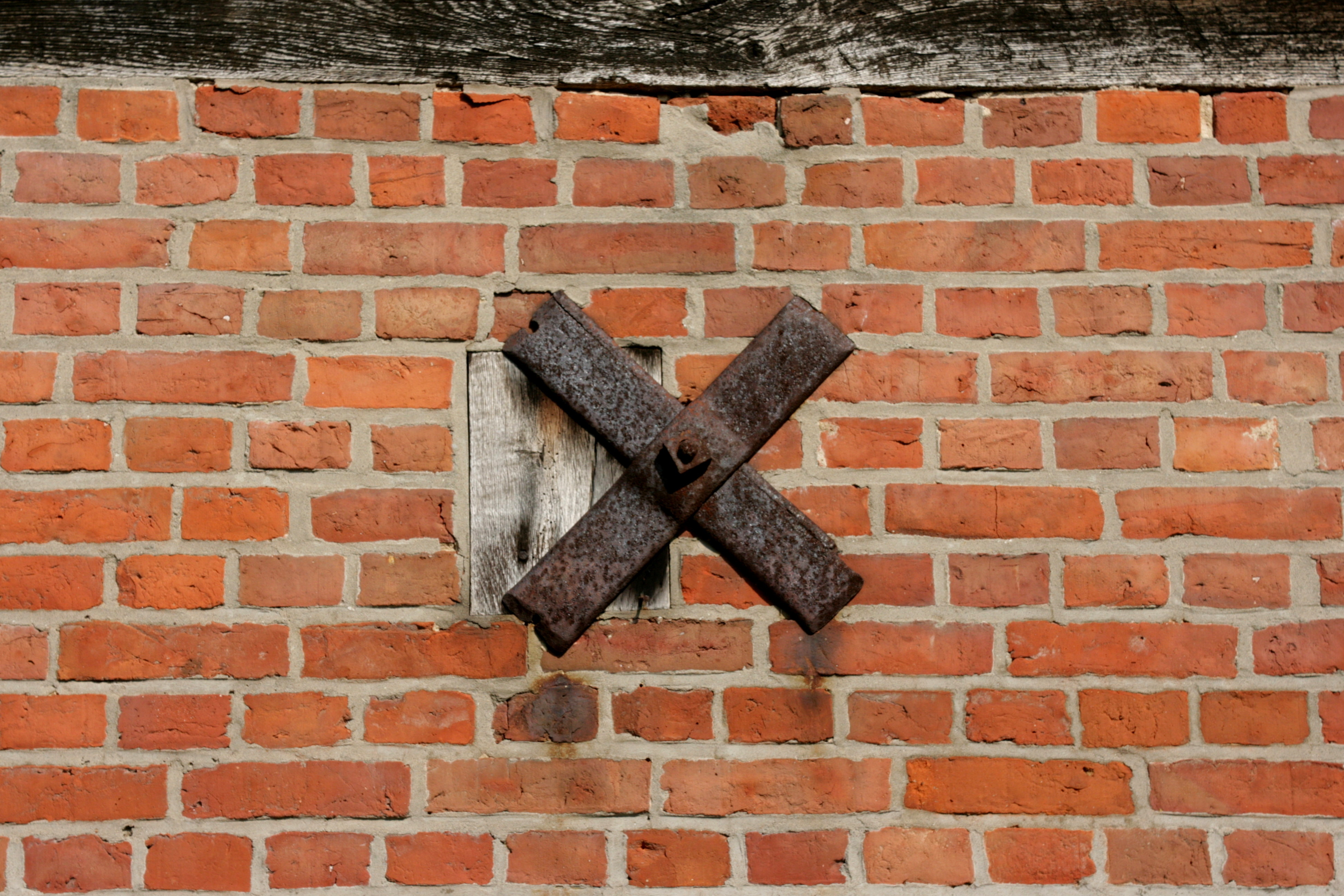
X-shaped wall anchor in Lower Saxony

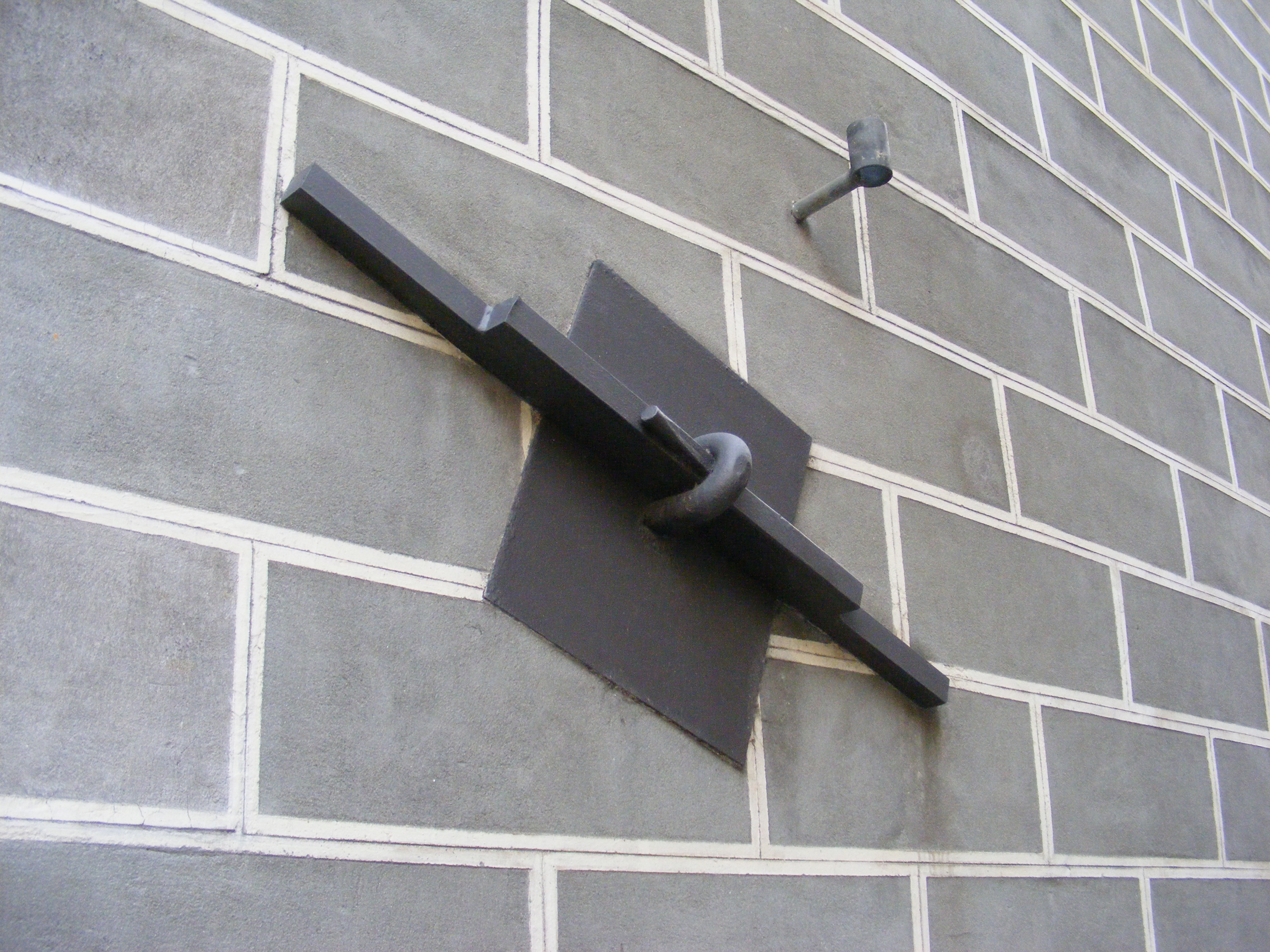
Bar-style wall anchor in Florence

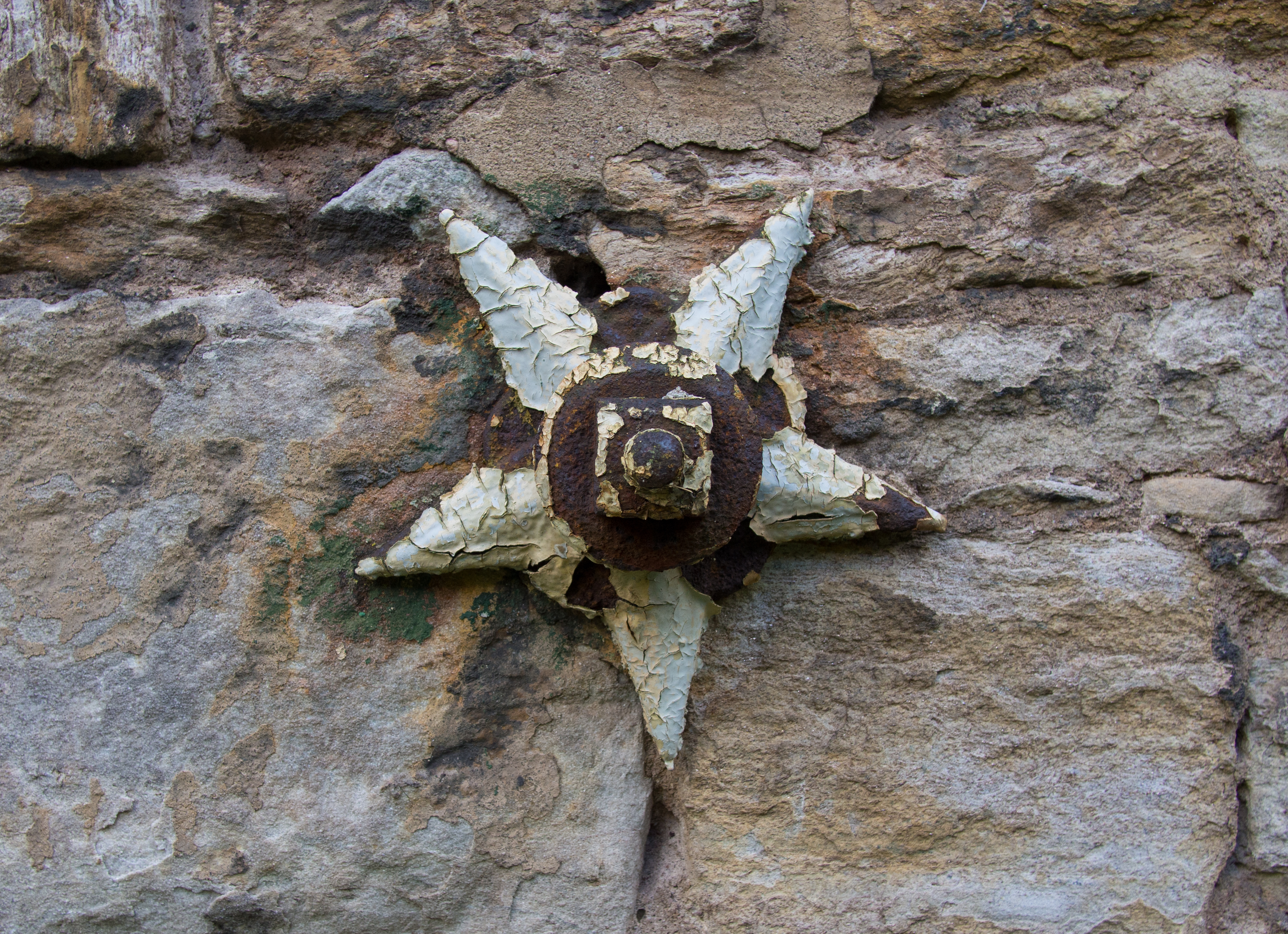
A star-shaped anchor plate in New York City

A star-shaped anchor plate in Soulard, St. Louis

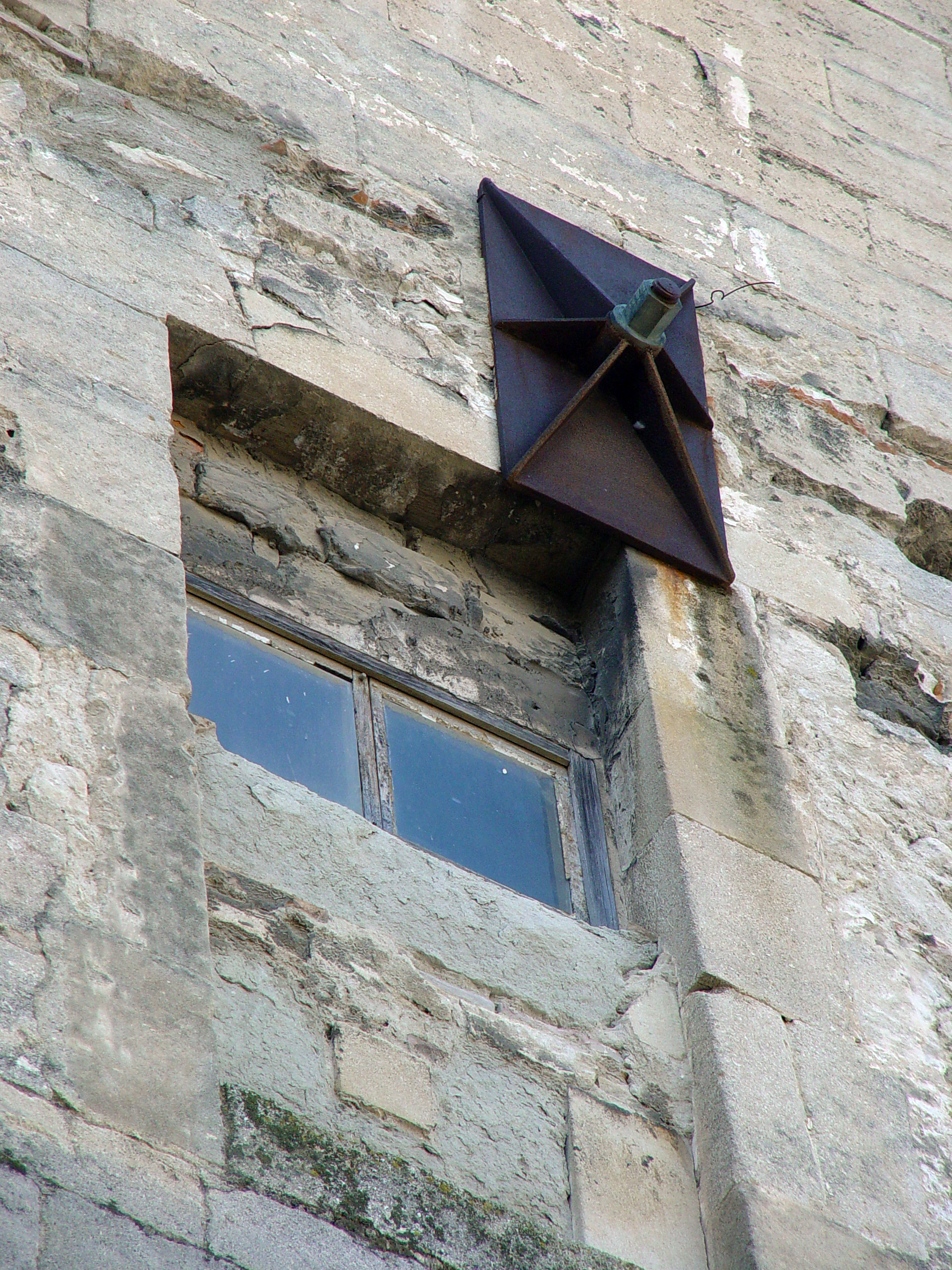
An anchor plate in the cloister of the Church of St. Trophime, Arles (France)

== See also ==
- Barnstar, a purely decorative device
- Tie (cavity wall), used internally within cavity walls
