= Interstitial condensation =

Interstitial condensation is a type of condensation that may occur within an enclosed wall, roof or floor cavity of a structure, which can cause a number of moisture-related problems.

When moisture-laden air at dew point temperature penetrates inside a cavity of the structure, it condenses into liquid water on that surface. The moisture laden air can penetrate into hidden interstitial wall cavity through the exterior in a warm/humid outdoor period, and from inside the building during warm/humid indoor periods. Groundwater soaking the basement foundation walls from wet soil is common. This can result from a high water table or from improperly drained rainwater runoff soaking into the ground next to the basement walls. Moisture saturated basement walls will add moisture directly into basement interstitial spaces leading to interstitial condensation with cool basement temperatures.

All interstitial condensation can cause uncontrolled mold and bacteria growth, rotting of wood components, corrosion of metal components and/or a reduction in the thermal insulation's effectiveness. The resulting structural damage, along with mold and bacteria growth, may occur without any visible surface indications until significant damage or extensive mold and bacteria growth has occurred. HVAC ducts within interstitial spaces (chases) can leak out cold air through unsealed joints/connections which produces dew point surfaces. Unsealed duct joints/connections can also create suction that pulls humid air into interstitial spaces and chases. This can promote more mold and bacteria growth on the condensed cool surfaces of the interstitial spaces. In addition, the cool ducts themselves can condense humid air and “sweat” even more liquid water into the interstitial spaces thereby exacerbating mold and bacteria growth.

Since most building materials are permeable and many joints are not completely sealed, it's critical in controlling interstitial condensation to control indoor moisture at its sources (venting out shower vapor), through HVAC dehumidification, ventilation and by adding an impermeable vapor barrier in the interstitial cavity. In addition, since the air in interstitial cavities can communicate with interior spaces through tiny cracks and unsealed joints, any airborne mold, aerosolized fungal fragments and bacteria growth in the interstitial cavity can travel into the building's air to then be breathed in by building occupants.

Interstitial condensation is differentiated from surface condensation in buildings which is known as "cold-bridge condensation" or "warm front condensation" where the condensation forms on the interior or exterior surfaces of a building rather than inside wall, floor or roof cavities.

== Moisture sources ==
It is physically impossible to build envelope assemblies so that they completely prevent air infiltration, exfiltration of water vapor diffusion. Moist air can infiltrate envelope assemblies driven by the pressure differential created by wind and stack effect. Since all buildings contain various levels of moist air, cognizant authorities have recommended maintaining an indoor relative humidity of air between 40% and 60%. The sources of interior moisture are people, appliances such as dishwashers, cooking, showers, wet basements, leaking pipes and roof/wall rainwater leaks. Leaks of liquid water into the building envelope are a different problem than interstitial moisture condensation, but this additional water can exacerbate interstitial wetting which can increase mold and bacteria growth.

== Discovering wet interstitial spaces ==
Building professionals have moisture sensing instruments to discover areas of interstitial condensation which may contain possible mold & bacteria growth. There are three primary methods to test for interstitial moisture-surface testing and cavity testing:

1. Surface testing with pin-type moisture meters. This meter works on a resistance principle that measures the flow of electricity between two pin tips and measures the moisture of that very tiny path. Pin meters only measure the moisture at the point in the material (drywall or wood) between the two pins.
2. Behind wall testing with electromagnetic moisture meters. This meter detects and evaluates moisture conditions within various building materials by non-destructively measuring the electrical impedance. A low frequency electronic signal is transmitted into the material via the electrodes in the base of the instrument. The strength of this signal varies in proportion to the amount of moisture in the material under test. The moisture meter determines the strength of the current and converts this to a moisture content value, displaying it on an analog dial or digital screen.
3. Infrared cameras to detect surface temperatures (wet walls are cooler). Infrared cameras are good tools for quickly finding surface moisture, but depend on sufficiently wetted surfaces which show up as a cooler temperature. Depending on the instrument's quality and sensitivity, the instrument may or may not find surface moisture area, and should always be used in conjunction with surface or behind wall meters..

== Prevention ==
Preventing interstitial condensation by keeping these hidden spaces dry, is critical in all buildings. This is done by:

1. maintaining a slightly positive indoor pressure in warm months and a neutral pressurization in cold months;
2. preventing infiltration (exterior air leakage into the building);
3. preventing exfiltration (interior air leakage into the assemblies);
4. controlling indoor moisture at its sources through exhaust ventilation,
5. having correct HVAC design for efficient air dehumidification;
6. effective vapor barrier wall sealing;
7. proper insulation;
8. using an diffusion tight vapor barrier (vapor check) on the warm side of the insulation, i.e., inside the assembly on a heated building and outside on a cooled building.

Vapor barriers can be problematic because they difficult to install perfectly and also reduce the ability of a cavity to dry out when it does get wet. Vapor barriers are used in conjunction with a housewrap which are vapor permeable but a water resistant membrane, so that one side of the cavity is permeable to allow drying. Spray foam insulation can an effective vapor barrier if applied correctly.

Historically, most buildings built before the twentieth century were not designed to maintain 70F/21C, were both naturally well ventilated and built with very permeable materials. The increase in interstitial condensation problems are due to:

1. the modern prevalence of central heating and air conditioning;
2. the construction of air-tighter enclosures causing buildings to be negatively pressurized;
3. more heavily insulated buildings;
4. more indoor plumbing sweating and leaking.

== Other construction ==
Interstitial condensation problems may also occur in other structures with enclosed air spaces along with the presence of high humidity and a large temperature difference between exterior and interior, including refrigerated vehicles.

== Freezing ==
The process may cause further problems if freezing is involved. Condensed water expands when frozen, possibly causing further structural damage.
