= Uncertainties in building design and building energy assessment =

The detailed design of buildings needs to take into account various external factors, which may be subject to uncertainties. Among these factors are prevailing weather and climate; the properties of the materials used and the standard of workmanship; and the behaviour of occupants of the building. Several studies have indicated that it is the behavioural factors that are the most important among these. Methods have been developed to estimate the extent of variability in these factors and the resulting need to take this variability into account at the design stage.

== Sources of uncertainty ==
Earlier work includes a paper by Gero and Dudnik (1978) presenting a methodology to solve the problem of designing heating, ventilation and air conditioning systems subjected to uncertain demands. Since then, other authors have shown an interest in the uncertainties that are present in building design. Ramallo-González (2013) classified uncertainties in energy building assessment tools in three different groups:

1. Environmental. Uncertainty in weather prediction under changing climate; and uncertain weather data information due to the use of synthetic weather data files: (1) use of synthetic years that do not represent a real year, and (2) use of a synthetic year that has not been generated from recorded data in the exact location of the project but in the closest weather station.
2. Workmanship and quality of building elements. Differences between the design and the real building: Conductivity of thermal bridges, conductivity of insulation, value of infiltration (air leakage), or U-values of walls and windows.
3. Behavioural. All other parameters linked to human behaviour, e.g. opening of doors and windows, use of appliances, occupancy patterns or cooking habits.

== Weather and climate ==
=== Climate change ===
Buildings have long life spans: for example, in England and Wales, around 40% of the office blocks existing in 2004 were built before 1940 (30% if considered by floor area), and 38.9% of English dwellings in 2007 were built before 1944. This long life span makes buildings likely to operate with climates that might change due to global warming. De Wilde and Coley (2012) showed how important is to design buildings that take into consideration climate change and that are able to perform well in future weathers.

=== Weather data ===
The use of synthetic weather data files may introduce further uncertainty. Wang et al. (2005) showed the impact that uncertainties in weather data (among others) may cause in energy demand calculations. The deviation in calculated energy use due to variability in the weather data were found to be different in different locations from a range of (-0.5% to 3%) in San Francisco to a range of (-4% to 6%) in Washington D.C. The ranges were calculated using a Typical Meteorological Year (TMY) as the reference.

The spatial resolution of weather data files was the concern covered by Eames et al. (2011). Eames showed how a low spatial resolution of weather data files can be the cause of disparities of up to 40% in the heating demand. The reason is that this uncertainty is not understood as an aleatory parameter but as an epistemic uncertainty that can be solved with the appropriate improvement of the data resources or with specific weather data acquisition for each project.

== Building materials and workmanship ==
A large study was carried out by Leeds Metropolitan University at Stamford Brook in England. This project saw 700 dwellings built to high efficiency standards. The results of this project show a significant gap between the energy used expected before construction and the actual energy use once the house is occupied. The workmanship is analysed in this work. The authors emphasise the importance of thermal bridges that were not considered for the calculations, and that the thermal bridges that have the largest impact on the final energy use are those originated by the internal partitions that separate dwellings. The dwellings that were monitored in use in this study show a large difference between the real energy use and that estimated using the UK Standard Assessment Procedure (SAP), with one of them giving +176% of the expected value when in use.

Hopfe has published several papers concerning uncertainties in building design. A 2007 publication looks into uncertainties of types 2 and 3. In this work the uncertainties are defined as normal distributions. The random parameters are sampled to generate 200 tests that are sent to the simulator (VA114), the results from which will be analysed to check the uncertainties with the largest impact on the energy calculations. This work showed that the uncertainty in the value used for infiltration is the factor that is likely to have the largest influence on cooling and heating demands. De Wilde and Tian (2009) agreed with Hopfe on the impact of uncertainties in infiltration upon energy calculations, but also introduced other factors.

The work of Schnieders and Hermelink (2006) showed a substantial variability in the energy demands of low-energy buildings designed under the same (Passivhaus) specification.

== Occupant behaviour ==
Blight and Coley (2012) showed that substantial variability in energy use can be occasioned due to variance in occupant behaviour, including the use of windows and doors. Their paper also demonstrated that their method of modelling occupants’ behaviour accurately reproduces actual behavioural patterns of inhabitants. This modelling method was the one developed by Richardson et al. (2008), using the Time-Use Survey (TUS) of the United Kingdom as a source for real behaviour of occupants, based on the activity of more than 6000 occupants as recorded in 24-hour diaries with a 10-minute resolution. Richardson's paper shows how the tool is able to generate behavioural patterns that correlate with the real data obtained from the TUS.

== Multifactorial studies ==
In the work of Pettersen (1994), uncertainties of group 2 (workmanship and quality of elements) and group 3 (behaviour) of the previous grouping were considered. This work shows how important occupants’ behaviour is on the calculation of the energy demand of a building. Pettersen showed that the total energy use follows a normal distribution with a standard deviation of around 7.6% when the uncertainties due to occupants are considered, and of around 4.0% when considering those generated by the properties of the building elements.

Wang et al. (2005) showed that deviations in energy demand due to local variability in weather data were smaller than the ones due to operational parameters linked with occupants’ behaviour. For those, the ranges were (-29% to 79%) for San Francisco and (-28% to 57%) for Washington D.C. The conclusion of this paper is that occupants will have a larger impact in energy calculations than the variability between synthetically generated weather data files.

Another study performed by de Wilde and Wei Tian (2009) compared the impact of most of the uncertainties affecting building energy calculations, including uncertainties in: weather, U-Value of windows, and other variables related with occupants’ behaviour (equipment and lighting), and taking into account climate change. De Wilde and Tian used a two-dimensional Monte Carlo simulation analysis to generate a database obtained with 7280 runs of a building simulator. A sensitivity analysis was applied to this database to obtain the most significant factors on the variability of the energy demand calculations. Standardised regression coefficients and standardised rank regression coefficients were used to compare the impacts of the uncertainties. Their paper compares many of the uncertainties with a good sized database providing a realistic comparison for the scope of the sampling of the uncertainties.

== See also ==
- ASHRAE
- Building energy simulation
