= IDA Indoor Climate and Energy =

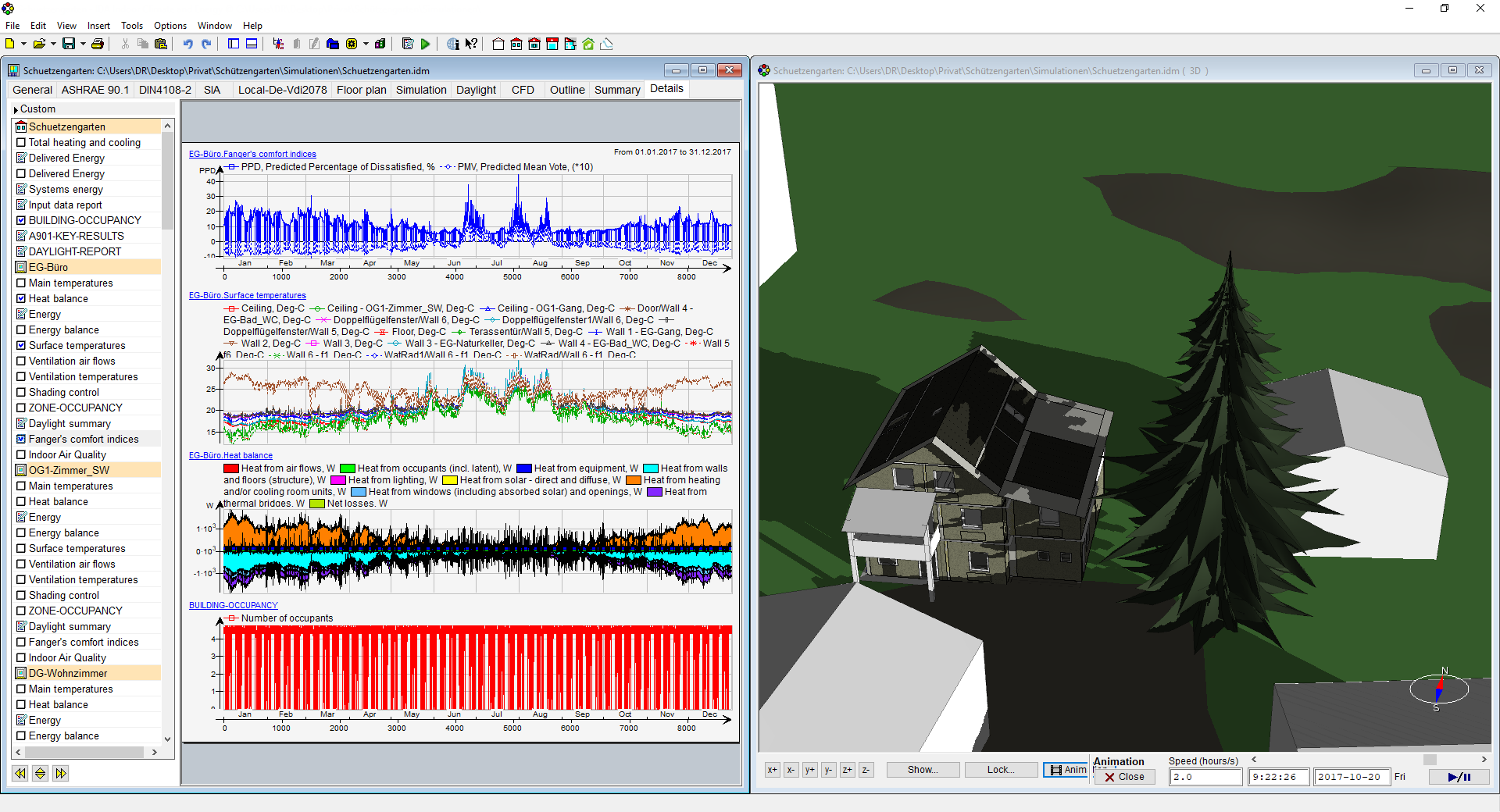
- Developer(s): EQUA Simulation AB
- Initial release: 1998
- Stable release: 4.8 (SP2)
- Written in: NMF, Modelica
- Operating system: Windows
- Available in: English, German, French, Swedish, Finnish
- License: Trialware
- Website: www.equa.se/en/ida-ice

IDA Indoor Climate and Energy (IDA ICE) is a Building performance simulation (BPS) software. IDA ICE is a simulation application for the multi-zonal and dynamic study of indoor climate phenomena as well as energy use. The implemented models are state of the art, many studies show that simulation results and measured data compare well.

== User interface ==
The user interface of IDA ICE makes it easy to create simple cases but also offers the flexibility to go into detail about advanced studies. Many inputs are adaptable to local requirements such as climate data, material data, system components or result reports. IDA ICE provides a 3D environment for geometry modeling, the table-based input of boundary conditions provide good visual feedback and enables efficient quality check. A simple procedure for calculating and reporting cooling, heating, air demand, and energy, together with a built-in version handling system, makes it efficient to compare different systems and results.

Advanced daylight calculation are achieved by interfacing the Radiance lighting simulation tool with result visualization in the 3D environment. A module for Appendix G of ASHRAE 90.1-2010 is available, this is used for example in LEED and BREEAM. The integrated radiosity method with single reflection and one measuring point can be used for whole-year daylight analysis and allows modeling daylight-based control strategies (e.g. shading devices, artificial lightening).

There is also the "Early Stage Building Optimization" (ESBO) user interface which makes it possible for users to experiment with variations in both buildings and systems at an early stage with a minimum of user input. A full range of component models for renewable energy studies is available, with boreholes, stratified tanks, heat pumps, solar collectors, CHP, PV, wind turbines, etc.

An interface with OpenFOAM for detailed CFD studies is in development.

== Input ==
IDA ICE supports IFC BIM models generated by tools such as ArchiCAD, Revit, MagiCAD, and others. Geometry an shading on site can also be imported from SketchUp, Rhino or other geometry tools. Solar influx is evaluated through windows (also internal) with full 3D accounting for the local shading situation. Additionally it has an integrated geometry editor where building and zone geometry can be modeled with 2D architectural drawings or pictures serving as template.

Climate files like EnergyPlus weather files (EPW) or ASHRAE climate files, can be downloaded and installed. The table-based input structure allows full interoperability with MS Excel and comparable software. Modern features like copy and paste and Drag&drop combined with visual input data check make input data management easier.

== Output ==
IDA ICE output include tables, charts, reports and plots. 3D visualizations (both stills and animations) show geometry, solar shadings, color coded input data as well as results. Arrow animations in 3D visualize ventilation air flows, window energy balance, and wind driven flows. There are special reports for LEED submittal forms included. The diagram plots deliver vector graphics which allows detailed result analysis in custom reports. Results can be exported to Microsoft Word or Excel. A single zone IDA ICE model with default systems comprises a total of approximately 2 000 time dependent variables, any of which may be plotted.

Predefined output files and reports cover

- Zone heat and energy balances: solar radiation, occupants, equipment, lights, mechanical ventilation, heating and cooling devices, air leakage, thermal bridge losses and surface transmission
- Control signals: window opening and shading, signals for secondary and primary systems
- Building occupancy: for each zone or the whole building
- Heat and mass transfer: detailed heat fluxes of surfaces and air streams
- Indoor air quality: CO_{2}-content of indoor air and moisture levels, air change rate
- Comfort indices: operative temperature, surface temperatures, PPD and PMV, unmet load hours, EN15251 comfort results and daylight availability
- Energy demand: total energy separated by application, including energy costs based on time-dependent prices, primary energy results and CO_{2} emission
