= TMY =

TMY can refer to:

- Tesla Model Y, battery electric compact luxury crossover SUV
- Typical meteorological year
- The code on Kodak T-MAX 400 negative film
