= Beausoleil =

Beausoleil or beau soleil means "good sun" in French. It could also refer to:

== Places ==
=== Canada ===
- Beausoleil, New Brunswick, a community
- Beausoleil First Nation, a mainly Ojibwa (Chippewa) First Nation located in Simcoe County, Ontario
- Beausoleil Island, an 8-kilometer long island in Lake Huron, Ontario

=== France ===
- Beausoleil, Alpes-Maritimes, a commune, adjoining the Principality of Monaco
- Beausoleil, a rural hamlet in the commune of Compreignac, Nouvelle-Aquitaine

=== Switzerland ===
- Collège Alpin International Beau Soleil, a private international school located in Villars-sur-Ollon, Vaud canton

== Entertainment ==
- BeauSoleil, an American musical group specializing in Cajun music
- "Beau Soleil" (The Killing), the twelfth episode of the American television drama series The Killing

== People ==
- Bobby Beausoleil (born 1947), former associate of the Manson Family
- Claude Beausoleil (1948–2020), Canadian poet and writer
- Cléophas Beausoleil (1845–1904), Canadian journalist, publisher, lawyer and politician
- Ian Beausoleil-Morrison, American aerospace engineer
- Joseph Broussard (1702–1765), also known as Beausoleil, leader of the Acadian people in Acadia, later Nova Scotia and New Brunswick, Canada
- Joseph Malboeuf, dit Beausoleil (1752–1823), farmer, blacksmith and political figure in Lower Canada
- Martine Bertereau, also known as Baroness de Beausoleil (c. 1600 – after 1642), French mining engineer and mineralogist
