= International Building Performance Simulation Association =

- Abbreviation: IBPSA
- Formation: January 1987
- Type: Non-profit
- Members: 4,700
- Website: www.ibpsa.org

The International Building Performance Simulation Association (IBPSA), is a non-profit international society of building performance simulation researchers, developers and practitioners, dedicated to improving the built environment. IBPSA aims to provide a forum for researchers, developers and practitioners to review building model developments, encourage the use of software programs, address standardization, accelerate integration and technology transfer, via exchange of knowledge and organization of (inter)national conferences.

== Organization ==
IBPSA is an international organization with regional affiliate organizations around the world. IBPSA is governed by a board of directors elected by the membership of all the regional affiliates. In addition to the president, vice-president, secretary, and treasurer, the board is made up of members-at-large and representatives sent by the regional affiliates.

== Publications ==
=== Newsletter ===
ibpsaNEWS, IBPSA's online newsletter is published twice per year. The current edition and past issues are available at the IBPSA website.

=== Conference proceedings ===
IBPSA is organizer of the bi-annual international IBPSA Building Simulation Conference and Exhibition. Building Simulation is the premier international event in the field of building performance simulation. In addition to the international conferences, some regional affiliates organize local conferences, as well. All papers presented in the proceedings of these conferences are available at IBPSA's website.

=== Journal ===
The Journal of Building Performance Simulation (JBPS) is the official peer-reviewed scientific journal of the International Building Performance Simulation Association. JBPS publishes articles of the highest quality that are original, cutting-edge, well-researched and of significance to the international community. The journal also offers a forum for original review papers and researched case studies. JBPS is published by Taylor & Francis Group, and co-edited by Dr. Jan Hensen (Eindhoven University of Technology) and Prof. Ian Beausoleil-Morrison (Carleton University).

=== Regional affiliates ===
Membership of IBPSA is organized through regional affiliates. These affiliates plan and coordinate different types of activities, such as conferences, software workshops, symposia, etc. There are currently 31 regional IBPSA affiliates, spanning 5 continents: Argentina, Australasia, Brazil, Canada, China, Chile, Czechia, Danube, Egypt, England, France, Germany, India, Indonesia, Ireland, Italy, Japan, Korea, Mexico, Netherlands + Flanders, Nordic, Poland, Russia, Scotland, Singapore, Slovakia, Spain, Switzerland, Turkey, USA, and Vietnam.

== Support for building performance simulation users ==
IBPSA has partnered with ASHRAE and IESNA to develop the Building Energy Modeling Professional Certification scheme. In addition, IBPSA is supporter of mailing lists and question-and-answer websites that stimulation knowledge exchange and discussion among users of building performance simulation in research and practice.

== Awards ==
IBPSA has three awards and also recognizes Fellows:

== See also ==
- Air Infiltration and Ventilation Centre
- Building performance
- CIBSE
