= EnergyPlus =

Whole-building energy simulation program

EnergyPlus is a whole-building energy simulation program that engineers, architects, and researchers use to model both energy consumption — for heating, cooling, ventilation, lighting, and process and plug loads — and water use in buildings. Its development is funded by the U.S. Department of Energy Building Technologies Office. EnergyPlus is a console-based program that reads input and writes output to text files. Several comprehensive graphical interfaces for EnergyPlus are also available.

== Main features ==
- Integrated, simultaneous solution of thermal zone conditions and HVAC system response that does not assume that the HVAC system can meet zone loads and can simulate un-conditioned and under-conditioned spaces.
- Sub-hourly, user-definable time steps for interaction between thermal zones and the environment; with automatically varied time steps for interactions between thermal zones and HVAC systems
- Heat balance-based solution of radiant and convective effects that produce surface temperatures thermal comfort and condensation calculations
- Atmospheric pollutant calculations
- Anisotropic sky model
- Combined heat and mass transfer model that accounts for air movement between zones.
- Heat transfer model
- Simulation based on climate zone
- Advanced fenestration models including controllable window blinds, electrochromic glazings, and layer-by-layer heat balances that calculate solar energy absorbed by window panes.
- Component-based HVAC that supports both standard and novel system configurations.

=== Stand-alone vs coupled simulation ===
EnergyPlus is normally used as a stand-alone command-line application or together with one of many free or commercial GUIs. However, EnergyPlus can be linked with other applications to simulate more advanced numerical models. One method is BCVTB (Building Controls Virtual Test Bed), which allows users to couple different simulation programs for co-simulation, and to couple simulation programs with actual hardware. For example, the BCVTB can simulate a building in EnergyPlus and the HVAC and control system in Modelica, exchanging data between them as they simulate. Programs that can be linked to BCVTB include EnergyPlus, Modelica (OpenModelica or Dymola), Functional Mock-up Units, MATLAB, and Simulink, Radiance for ray-tracing, ESP-r, TRNSYS, BACnet stack.

== Applications for sensitivity analysis with EnergyPlus ==
There exist many software tools that can automate sensitivity analysis to various degrees. Here is a non-exhaustive list. Most of these tools have multiple options, including one-at-a-time sensitivity analysis, multidimensional discrete parametric, continuous low-discrepancy distributions, and pareto-front optimization (listed alphabetically):

- EnergyPlus parametric IDF objects. This simple method is limited to discrete parametric analysis, using the auxiliary ParametricPreprocessor program that is bundled with EnergyPlus.
- EPlusR (EnergyPlus R): A research-level scripting toolkit for EnergyPlus in R (programming language).
- EpXL (EnergyPlus Excel): A simple Excel spreadsheet application with options for sensitivity/parametric analysis and pareto-front optimization.
- GenOpt (Generic Optimization Program), optionally with the free GenOpt GUI ExcalibBEM
- jEPlus (Jython EnergyPlus): A simulation manager for parametric analysis with EnergyPlus.
- OpenStudio Analysis Framework and Spreadsheet: A front-end for the OpenStudio Server, allowing for users to create large-scale cloud analyses using OpenStudio measures.
- SALib: A Python library for general sensitivity analysis, which can be used with user-defined scripts to run EnergyPlus and extract results.

== See also ==
- Building performance simulation
- Efficient energy use
- Heating system
- HVAC
- Occupancy
- Renewable energy
