= Engineering Equation Solver =

Engineering Equation Solver (EES) is a commercial software package used for solution of systems of simultaneous non-linear equations. It provides many useful specialized functions and equations for the solution of thermodynamics and heat transfer problems, making it a useful and widely used program for mechanical engineers working in these fields. EES stores thermodynamic properties, which eliminates iterative problem solving by hand through the use of code that calls properties at the specified thermodynamic properties. EES performs the iterative solving, eliminating the tedious and time-consuming task of acquiring thermodynamic properties with its built-in functions.

EES also includes parametric tables that allow the user to compare a number of variables at a time. Parametric tables can also be used to generate plots. EES can also integrate, both as a command in code and in tables. EES also provides optimization tools that minimize or maximize a chosen variable by varying a number of other variables. Lookup tables can be created to store information that can be accessed by a call in the code. EES code allows the user to input equations in any order and obtain a solution, but also can contain if-then statements, which can also be nested within each other to create if-then-else statements. Users can write functions for use in their code, and also procedures, which are functions with multiple outputs.

Adjusting the preferences allows the user choose a unit system, specify stop criteria, including the number of iterations, and also enable/disable unit checking and recommending units, among other options. Users can also specify guess values and variable limits to aid the iterative solving process and help EES quickly and successfully find a solution.

The program is developed by F-Chart Software, a commercial spin-off of Prof Sanford A Klein from Department of Mechanical Engineering University of Wisconsin-Madison.

EES is included as attached software for a number of undergraduate thermodynamics, heat-transfer and fluid mechanics textbooks from McGraw-Hill.

It integrates closely with the dynamic system simulation package TRNSYS, by some of the same authors.
