= Energy signature =

Example of an energy signature showing a linear relationship between daily cooling and heating demand with average daily ambient temperature.

In mechanical engineering, energy signatures (also called change-point regression models) relate energy demand of buildings to climatic variables, typically ambient temperature. Also other climatic variables such as heating or cooling degree days are used. In most cases, heating or cooling building energy demand is analysed through energy signatures, but also hot water or electricity demand is considered.

Energy signatures make a simplified assumption of a linear relationship between a building's energy demand and temperature. This assumption allows for balancing accuracy with computation time, as the estimation of energy demand through energy signatures is considerably faster than using building performance simulation software. A crucial advantage of applying energy signatures is that no detailed information on the geometrical, construction, and operational characteristics of buildings needs to be available.
