= Performance gap =

A performance gap is a disparity that is found between the energy use predicted and carbon emissions in the design stage of buildings and the energy use of those buildings in operation. Research in the UK suggests that actual carbon emissions from new homes can be 2.5 times the design estimates, on average. For non-domestic buildings, the gap is even higher - actual carbon emissions as much as 3.8 times the design estimates, on average.

There are established tools for reducing the performance gap, by reviewing project objectives, outline and detailed design drawings, design calculations, implementation of designs on site, and post-occupancy evaluation. NEF's Assured Performance Process (APP) is one such tool, which is being used extensively on different sites that form part of East Hampshire's Whitehill and Bordon new town development, one of the largest regeneration projects anywhere in the UK, with high ambitions for both environmental performance and health.

== Classification of factors that contribute to the performance gap ==
The performance gap is produced mainly due to uncertainties. Uncertainties are found in any “real-world” system, and buildings are no exception. As early as 1978, Gero and Dudnik wrote a paper presenting a methodology to solve the problem of designing subsystems (HVAC) subjected to uncertain demands. After that, other authors have shown an interest in the uncertainties that are present in building design; Ramallo-González classified uncertainties in building design/construction in three different groups:

1. Environmental. Uncertainty in weather prediction under changing climate; and uncertain weather data information due to the use of synthetic weather data files: (1) use of synthetic years that do not represent a real year, and (2) use of a synthetic year that has not been generated from recorded data in the exact location of the project but in the closest weather station.
2. Workmanship and quality of building elements. Differences between the design and the real building: Conductivity of thermal bridges, conductivity of insulation, value of infiltration or U-Values of walls and windows. There may be optimism bias by designers, where expectations about what is possible on site are unrealistic, and/or buildability fails to get adequate attention during design.
3. Behavioural. All other parameters linked to human behaviour i.e. door and window opening, heating regimes, use of appliances, occupancy patterns or cooking habits.

=== Type 1: Environmental uncertainties ===
The type 1 from this grouping, have been divided here into two main groups: one concerning the uncertainty due to climate change; and the other concerning uncertainties due to the use of synthetic weather data files. Concerning the uncertainties due to climate change: buildings have long life spans, for example, in England and Wales, around 40% of the office blocks existing in 2004 were built before 1940 (30% if considered by floor area). and, 38.9% of English dwellings in 2007 were built before 1944. This long life span makes buildings likely to operate with climates that might change due to global warming. De Wilde and Coley showed how important is to design buildings that take into consideration climate change and that are able to perform well in future weathers. Concerning the uncertainties due to the use of synthetic weather data files: Wang et al. showed the impact that uncertainties in weather data (among others) may cause in energy demand calculations. The deviation in calculated energy use due to variability in the weather data were found to be different in different locations from a range of (-0.5% – 3%) in San Francisco to a range of (-4% to 6%) in Washington D.C. The ranges were calculated using TMY as the reference. These deviations on the demand were smaller than the ones due to operational parameters. For those, the ranges were (-29% – 79%) for San Francisco and (-28% – 57%) for Washington D.C. The operation parameters were those linked with occupants’ behaviour. The conclusion of this paper is that occupants will have a larger impact in energy calculations than the variability between synthetically generated weather data files. The spatial resolution of weather data files was the concern covered by Eames et al. Eames showed how a low spatial resolution of weather data files can be the cause of disparities of up to 40% in the heating demand.

=== Type 2: Workmanship ===
In the work of Pettersen, uncertainties of group 2 (workmanship and quality of elements) and group 3 (behaviour) of the previous grouping were considered (Pettersen, 1994). This work shows how important occupants’ behaviour is on the calculation of the energy demand of a building. Pettersen showed that the total energy use follows a normal distribution with a standard deviation of around 7.6% when the uncertainties due to occupants are considered, and of around 4.0% when considering those generated by the properties of the building elements. A large study was carried out by Leeds Metropolitan at Stamford Brook. This project saw 700 dwellings built to high efficiency standards. The results of this project show a significant gap between the energy used expected before construction and the actual energy use once the house is occupied. The workmanship is analysed in this work. The authors emphasise the importance of thermal bridges that were not considered for the calculations, and how those originated by the internal partitions that separate dwellings have the largest impact on the final energy use. The dwellings that were monitored in use in this study show a large difference between the real energy use and that estimated using SAP, with one of them giving +176% of the expected value when in use.

Hopfe has published several papers concerning uncertainties in building design that cover workmanship. A more recent publication at the time of writing looks into uncertainties of group 2 and 3. In this work the uncertainties are defined as normal distributions. The random parameters are sampled to generate 200 tests that are sent to the simulator (VA114), the results from which will be analysed to check the uncertainties with the largest impact on the energy calculations. This work showed that the uncertainty in the value used for infiltration is the factor that is likely to have the largest influence on cooling and heating demands. Another study performed by de Wilde and Wei Tian, compared the impact of most of the uncertainties affecting building energy calculations taking into account climate change. De Wilde and Tian used a two dimensional Monte Carlo Analysis to generate a database obtained with 7280 runs of a building simulator. A sensitivity analysis was applied to this database to obtain the most significant factors on the variability of the energy demand calculations. Standardised Regression Coefficients and Standardised Rank Regression Coefficients were used to compare the impacts of the uncertainties.

De Wilde and Tian agreed with Hopfe on the impact of uncertainties in the infiltration over energy calculations, but also introduced other factors, including uncertainties in: weather, U-Value of windows, and other variables related with occupants’ behaviour (equipment and lighting). Their paper compares many of the uncertainties with a good sized database providing a realistic comparison for the scope of the sampling of the uncertainties. The work of Schnieders and Hermelink showed a substantial variability in the energy demands of low-energy buildings designed under the same specification (Passivhaus).

=== Type 3: Occupants ===
The work of Schnieders and Hermelink showed a substantial variability in the energy demands of low-energy buildings designed under the same specification (Passivhaus). Although the passivhaus standard has a very controlled, high quality workmanship, large differences have been seen in energy demand in different houses.

Blight and Coley showed that that variability can be occasioned due to variance in occupant behaviour (the use of windows and doors was included in this work). The work of Blight and Coley proves two things: (1) Occupants have a substantial influence on energy use; and (2) The model they used to generate occupants’ behaviour is accurate for the creation of behavioural patterns of inhabitants.

The method used in the previous paper to generate accurate profiles of occupants’ behaviour was the one developed by Richardson et al. The method was developed using the Time-Use Survey (TUS) of the United Kingdom as a reference of real behaviour of occupants, this database was elaborated after recording the activity of more than 6000 occupants in 24-hours diaries with a 10 minutes resolution . Richardson’s paper shows how the tool is able to generate behavioural patterns that correlate with the real data obtained from the TUS. The availability of this tool allows scientist’s to model the uncertainty of occupants’ behaviour as a set of behavioural patterns that have been proven to correlate with real occupants’ behaviour. There have been works published to take into account occupancy in optimisation using the so called robust optimisation
