= Ian Beausoleil-Morrison =

American aerospace engineer

Ian Beausoleil-Morrison is a Canadian energy expert. He is a full professor in the School of mechanical and aerospace engineering at Carleton University in Ottawa, Ontario and a past adjunct associate professor at both Dalhousie University and the University of Victoria. He holds a Bachelor's of Applied Science and a Master's of Applied Science from the University of Waterloo, and a Ph.D. from the University of Strathclyde, Scotland.

== Research interests ==
Beausoleil-Morrison's research interests are focused around the co-generation of heat and electricity, alternative cooling approaches, and maximizing solar energy utilization.

== Associations ==
He is past President of the International Building Performance Simulation Association (IBPSA).

== Previous employment ==
Prior to his employment at Carleton in 2007, Beausoleil-Morrison worked at Natural Resources Canada for 16 years as an energy researcher and simulator. He led Annex 42 International Energy Agency's Energy Conservation in Buildings and Community Systems Programme (IEA/ECBCS). He helped develop the University of Stratchclyde's ESP-r building simulation tool and is currently the archivist for the organization. He initiated and led a research project on micro-cogeneration for the International Energy Agency, is Vice-President of the International Building Performance Simulation Association (IBPSA), and has acted as scientific chair for numerous conferences on the topic of energy use in buildings.

== Papers ==
He has authored or co-authored more than 35 peer-reviewed papers and was the recipient of IBPSA's Outstanding Young Contributor Award in 2001.
