= OpenStudio =

Building information modeling software application suite

OpenStudio is a suite of free and open-source software applications for building energy analysis used in building information modeling. OpenStudio applications run on Microsoft Windows, Macintosh, and Linux platforms. Its primary application is a plugin for proprietary SketchUp that enables engineers to view and edit 3D models for EnergyPlus simulation software.

OpenStudio was first released in April 2008 by the National Renewable Energy Laboratory, a part of the U.S. Department of Energy. NREL reports an average of 700 OpenStudio downloads per month. Google's strategist for SketchUp said that "OpenStudio is lauded around our office as one of the most complicated plug-ins ever written for SketchUp".

OpenStudio was designed to work with SketchUp, because many architects already use SketchUp for building designs. The integration allows architects to analyze a design's energy performance before beginning construction.

The first private organization selected by NREL to conduct OpenStudio courses was Performance Systems Development, a New York–based training institute. Courses will be conducted for building professionals, software developers, and utility administrators. From May 2018, The Energy Simulation Academy (TESA) was selected as another private organization to conduct such training.

== Features ==
OpenStudio includes a Sketchup Plug-in and other associated applications:

- The Sketchup Plug-in allows users to create 3D geometry needed for EnergyPlus using the existing drawing tools.
- RunManager manages simulations and workflows and gives users access to the output files through a graphical interface.
- ResultsViewer enables browsing, plotting, and comparing EnergyPlus output data, especially time series.

== Sketchup Plugin ==
The OpenStudio Sketchup Plug-in allows users to use the standard SketchUp tools to create and edit EnergyPlus zones and surfaces. It allows SketchUp to view EnergyPlus input files in 3D. The plug-in allows users to mix EnergyPlus simulation content with decorative content.

The plug-in adds the building energy simulation capabilities of EnergyPlus to the SketchUp environment. Users can launch an EnergyPlus simulation of the model and view the results without leaving SketchUp.

The Plug-in allows engineers to:

- Create and edit EnergyPlus zones and surfaces
- Launch EnergyPlus and view the results without leaving SketchUp
- Match interzone surface boundary conditions
- Search for surfaces and subsurfaces by object name
- Add internal gains and simple outdoor air for load calculations
- Add the ideal HVAC system for load calculations
- Set and change default constructions
- Add daylighting controls and illuminance map

== See also ==
- Building information modeling
- SketchUp
- Trimble Navigation
