= Building performance =

Building performance is an attribute of a building that expresses how well that building carries out its functions. It may also relate to the performance of the building construction process. Categories of building performance are quality (how well the building fulfills its functions), resource savings (how much of a particular resource is needed to fulfill its functions) and workload capacity (how much the building can do). The performance of a building depends on the response of the building to an external load or shock. Building performance plays an important role in architecture, building services engineering, building regulation, architectural engineering and construction management. Furthermore, improving building performance (particularly energy efficiency) is important for addressing climate change, since buildings account for 30% of global energy consumption, resulting in 27% of global greenhouse gas emissions. Prominent building performance aspects are energy efficiency, occupant comfort, indoor air quality and daylighting.

== Background ==
Building performance has been of interest to humans since the very first shelters were built to protect us from the weather, natural enemies and other dangers. Initially design and performance were managed by craftsmen who combined their expertise in both domains. More formal approaches to building performance appeared in the 1970s and 1980s, with seminal works being the book on Building Performance and CIB Report 64. Further progress on building performance studies took place in parallel with the development of building science as a discipline, and with the introduction of personal computing (especially computer simulation) in the field; for a good overview of the role of simulation in building design see the chapter by Augenbroe. A more general overview that also includes physical measurement, expert judgement and stakeholder evaluation is presented in the book Building Performance Analysis. While energy efficiency, thermal comfort, indoor air quality and (day)lighting are very prominent in the debate on building performance, there is much longer list of building performance aspect that includes things like resistance against burglary, flexibility for change of use, and many others; for an overview see the building performance analysis platform website in the external links below.

== Building performance standards ==
There are several different building performance standards widely used for designing building codes and energy-efficiency certifications. For instance, the standards produced by ASHRAE (American Society of Heating, Refrigeration, and Air Conditioning Engineers) and the IECC (International Energy Conservation Code) have been widely used to inform local building codes and energy-efficiency certification programs, such as Passive House, Energy Star, and LEED. Building performance standards include specifications on the building envelope (which includes the windows, walls, roofs, and foundation), the HVAC system, electric lighting, hot water consumption, and home appliances, among others.

== See also ==
- Building energy simulation
- Ecological design
- Energy audit
- Environmental impact assessment
- Green retrofit
- Sociology of architecture
- Sustainable architecture
- Sustainable design
- Weatherization
