= Typical meteorological year =

Typical meteorological year (TMY) is a collation of selected weather data for a specific location, listing hourly values of solar radiation and meteorological elements for a one-year period. The values are generated from a data bank much longer than a year in duration, at least 12 years. It is specially selected so that it presents the range of weather phenomena for the location in question, while still giving annual averages that are consistent with the long-term averages for the location in question.

TMY data is frequently used in building simulation, in order to assess the expected heating and cooling costs for the design of the building. It is also used by designers of solar energy systems including solar domestic hot water systems and large-scale solar thermal power plants. Since they represent typical rather than extreme conditions, they are not suited for designing systems to meet the worst-case conditions occurring at a location. The source data is available for download from the National Renewable Energy Laboratory.

The first TMY collection was based on 229 locations in the US and was collected between 1948 and 1980. The second edition of the TMY is called "TMY2". It is based on 239 stations collecting data between 1961 and 1990. The TMY2 data include Precipitable water column (precipitable moisture), which is important in predicting radiative cooling. The third, and latest TMY collection (TMY3) was based on data for 1020 locations in the USA including Guam, Puerto Rico, and US Virgin Islands, derived from a 1976-2005 period of record where available, and a 1991-2005 period of record for all other locations. To account for the recent changes in climate, a set of updated TMY collection called "TMYx" has been published by the creators of EnergyPlus software covering the period from 2006 and 2021 for about 16,000 locations globally.

Commercial software packages supporting simulations using TMY data include TRNSYS, PV*SOL, PVscout, nPro and PVsyst. TMY data for specific locations will usually need to be paid for. On the other hand, an advanced, comprehensive, and free simulation package developed under funding from the US Department of Energy called EnergyPlus also reads TMY3 data files, and a large number of these are available at no cost from their website.

NREL provides access to TMY2 and TMY3 data sets and also uses these data sets in its online solar energy calculator PVWatts.
