= TRNSYS =

Simulation program

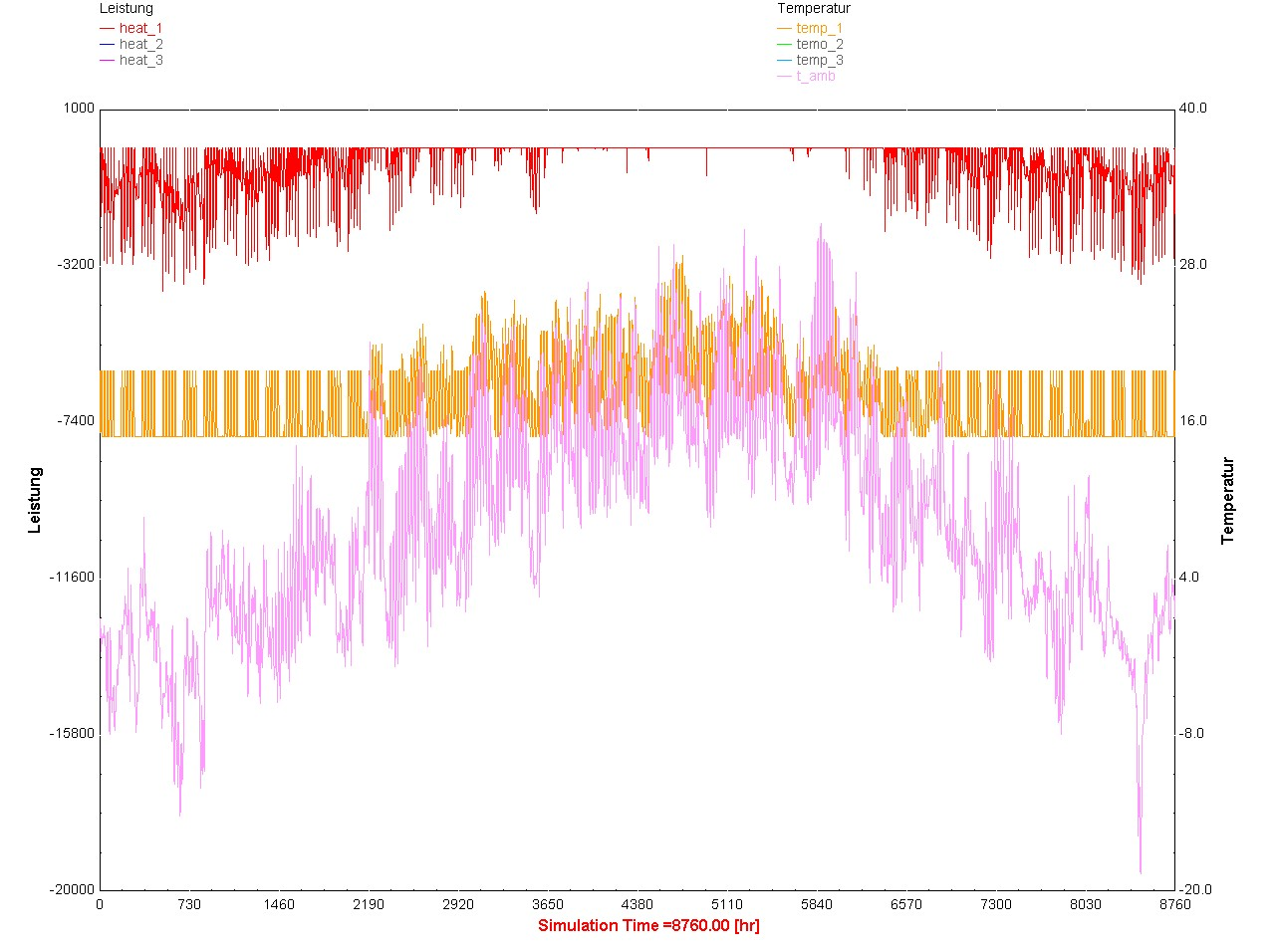
TRNSYS time series of output

TRNSYS is a simulation program primarily used in the fields of renewable energy engineering and building simulation for passive as well as active solar design. TRNSYS is a commercial software package developed at the University of Wisconsin.

One of its original applications was to perform dynamic simulation of the behaviour of a solar hot water system for a typical meteorological year so that the long-term cost savings of such a system could be ascertained.

It has been used in a number of scientific and technical publications for system simulations of various renewable and conventional energy sources.
