= ESP-r =

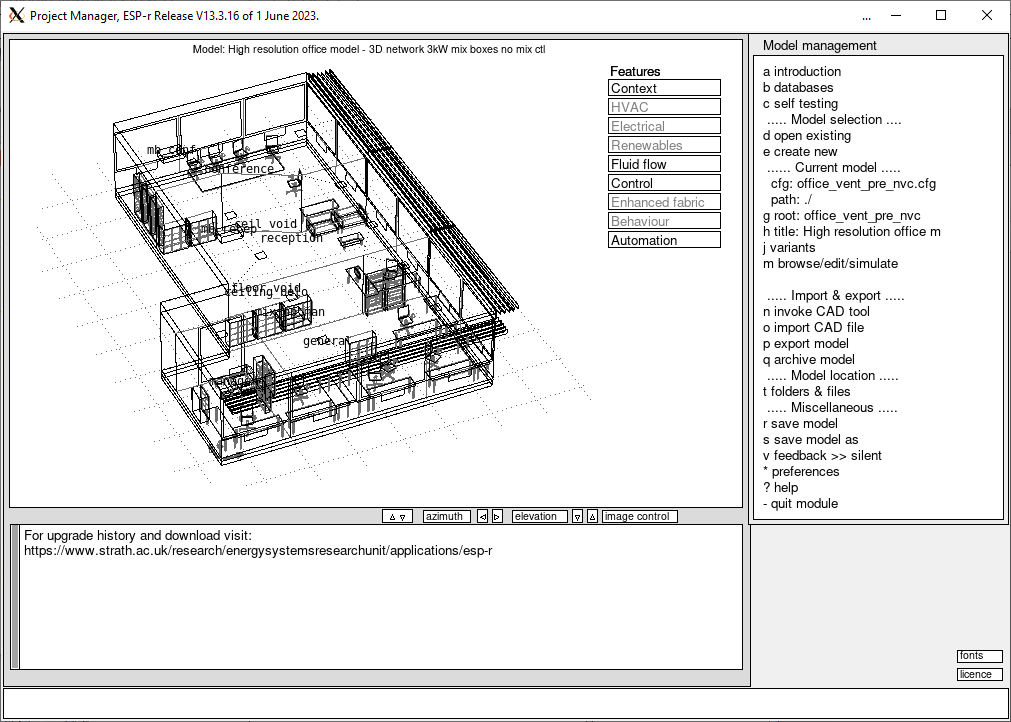
ESP-r main menu and an exemplar model

ESP-r is a research-oriented open-source building performance simulation software. ESP-r can model heat flow in thermal zones, fluid flow using networks or CFD, electrical power flow, moisture flow, contaminant flow, hygrothermal and fluid flow in HVAC systems, as well as visual and acoustic performance aspects within a modeled energy system/building.

ESP-r has been under development for the last 50 years, with contributions by researchers from several countries. ESP-r source-code was published in 2002, subject to the GNU General Public License, and the current version (V13.3.18) was released in May 2025. ESP-r is designed to work on Linux, but it can also run on Windows (using Windows Subsystem for Linux) and on macOS.

ESP-r has been extensively validated. Among other projects, ESP-r was part of BESTEST, an IEA initiative that created a benchmark for quality assessment of energy simulation software. This benchmark was later incorporated on ASHRAE Standard 140 - Method of Test for Evaluating Building Performance Simulation Software.
