= Thermal bridge =

Object reducing thermal resistance

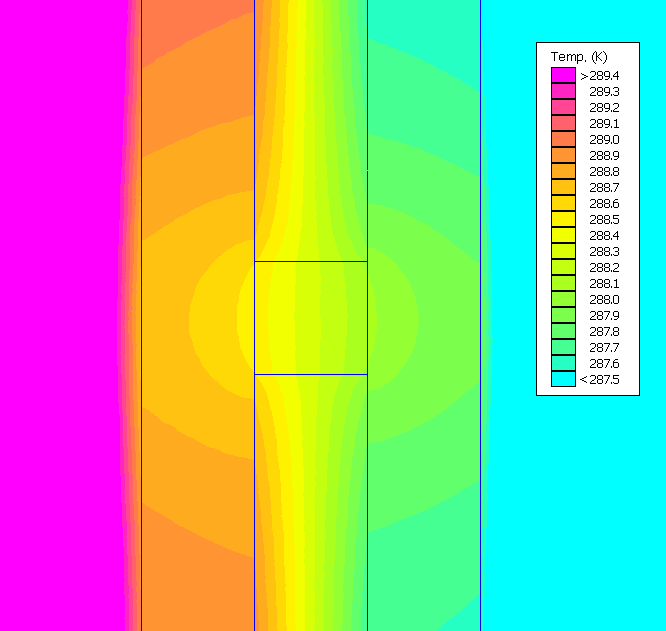
Temperature distribution in a thermal bridge

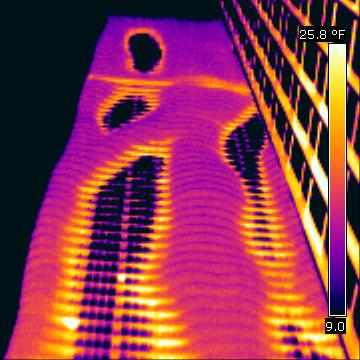
This thermal image shows a thermal bridging of a high-rise building (Aqua in Chicago)

A thermal bridge, also called a cold bridge, heat bridge, or thermal bypass, is an area or component of an object which has higher thermal conductivity than the surrounding materials, creating a path of least resistance for heat transfer. Thermal bridges result in an overall reduction in thermal resistance of the object. The term is frequently discussed in the context of a building's thermal envelope where thermal bridges result in heat transfer into or out of conditioned space.

Thermal bridges in buildings may impact the amount of energy required to heat and cool a space, cause condensation (moisture) within the building envelope, and result in thermal discomfort. In colder climates, thermal bridges can result in additional heat losses and require additional energy to mitigate.

There are strategies to reduce or prevent thermal bridging, such as limiting the number of building members that span from unconditioned to conditioned space and applying continuous building insulation materials to create thermal breaks.

== Concept ==
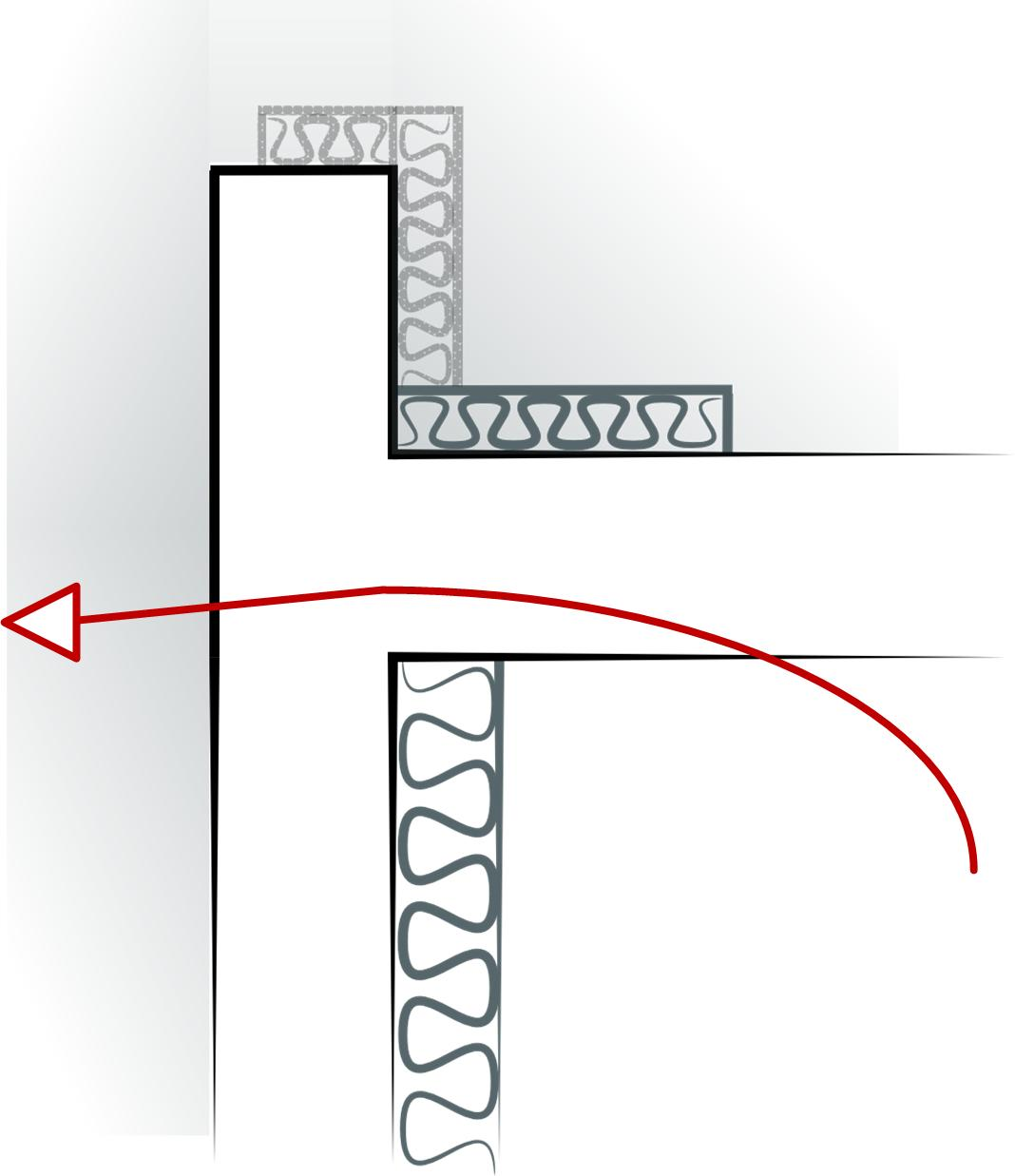
Thermal bridge at junction. Heat moves from the floor structure through the wall because there is no thermal break.

Heat transfer occurs through three mechanisms: convection, radiation, and conduction. A thermal bridge is an example of heat transfer through conduction. The rate of heat transfer depends on the thermal conductivity of the material and the temperature difference experienced on either side of the thermal bridge. When a temperature difference is present, heat flow will follow the path of least resistance through the material with the highest thermal conductivity and lowest thermal resistance; this path is a thermal bridge. Thermal bridging describes a situation in a building where there is a direct connection between the outside and inside through one or more elements that possess a higher thermal conductivity than the rest of the envelope of the building.

== Identification ==
Surveying buildings for thermal bridges is performed using passive infrared thermography (IRT) according to the International Organization for Standardization (ISO). Infrared thermography of buildings can allow thermal signatures that indicate heat leaks. IRT detects thermal abnormalities that are linked to the movement of fluids through building elements, highlighting the variations in the thermal properties of the materials that correspondingly cause a major change in temperature. The drop shadow effect, a situation in which the surrounding environment casts a shadow on the facade of the building, can lead to potential accuracy issues of measurements through inconsistent facade sun exposure. An alternative analysis method, Iterative Filtering (IF), can be used to solve this problem.

In all thermographic building inspections, the thermal image interpretation if performed by a human operator, involving a high level of subjectivity and expertise of the operator. Automated analysis approaches, such as laser scanning technologies, can provide thermal imaging on 3 dimensional CAD model surfaces and metric information to thermographic analyses. Surface temperature data in 3D models can identify and measure thermal irregularities of thermal bridges and insulation leaks. Thermal imaging can also be acquired through the use of unmanned aerial vehicles (UAV), fusing thermal data from multiple cameras and platforms. The UAV uses an infrared camera to generate a thermal field image of recorded temperature values, where every pixel represents radiative energy emitted by the surface of the building.

== In construction ==
Frequently, thermal bridging is used in reference to a building's thermal envelope, which is a layer of the building enclosure system that resists heat flow between the interior conditioned environment and the exterior unconditioned environment. Heat will transfer through a building's thermal envelope at different rates depending on the materials present throughout the envelope. Heat transfer will be greater at thermal bridge locations than where insulation exists because there is less thermal resistance. In the winter, when exterior temperature is typically lower than interior temperature, heat flows outward and will flow at greater rates through thermal bridges. At a thermal bridge location, the surface temperature on the inside of the building envelope will be lower than the surrounding area. In the summer, when the exterior temperature is typically higher than the interior temperature, heat flows inward, and at greater rates through thermal bridges. This causes winter heat losses and summer heat gains for conditioned spaces in buildings.

Despite insulation requirements specified by various national regulations, thermal bridging in a building's envelope remains a weak spot in the construction industry. Moreover, in many countries building design practices implement partial insulation measurements foreseen by regulations. As a result, thermal losses are greater in practice that is anticipated during the design stage.

An assembly such as an exterior wall or insulated ceiling is generally classified by a U-factor, in W/m^{2}·K, that reflects the overall rate of heat transfer per unit area for all the materials within an assembly, not just the insulation layer. Heat transfer via thermal bridges reduces the overall thermal resistance of an assembly, resulting in an increased U-factor.

Thermal bridges can occur at several locations within a building envelope; most commonly, they occur at junctions between two or more building elements. Common locations include:

- Floor-to-wall or balcony-to-wall junctions, including slab-on-grade and concrete balconies or outdoor patios that extend the floor slab through the building envelope
- Roof/ceiling-to-wall junctions, especially where full ceiling insulation depths may not be achieved
- Window-to-wall junctions
- Door-to-wall junctions
- Wall-to-wall junctions
- Wood, steel or concrete members, such as studs and joists, incorporated in exterior wall, ceiling, or roof construction
- Recessed luminaries that penetrate insulated ceilings
- Windows and doors, especially frames components
- Areas with gaps in or poorly installed insulation
- Metal ties in masonry cavity walls

Structural elements remain a weak point in construction, commonly leading to thermal bridges that result in high heat loss and low surface temperatures in a room.

=== Masonry walls ===
While thermal bridges exist in various types of building enclosures, masonry walls experience significantly increased U-factors caused by thermal bridges. Comparing thermal conductivities between different building materials allows for assessment of performance relative to other design options. Brick materials, which are usually used for facade enclosures, typically have higher thermal conductivities than timber, depending on the brick density and wood type. Concrete, which may be used for floors and edge beams in masonry buildings are common thermal bridges, especially at the corners. Depending on the physical makeup of the concrete, the thermal conductivity can be greater than that of brick materials. In addition to heat transfer, if the indoor environment is not adequately vented, thermal bridging may cause the brick material to absorb rainwater and humidity into the wall, which can result in mold growth and deterioration of building envelope material.

=== Curtain walls ===
Similar to masonry walls, curtain walls can experience significantly increased U-factors due to thermal bridging. Curtain wall frames are often constructed with highly conductive aluminum, which has a typical thermal conductivity above 200 W/m·K. In comparison, wood framing members are typically between 0.68 and 1.25 W/m·K. The aluminum frame for most curtain wall constructions extends from the exterior of the building through to the interior, creating thermal bridges.

== Impacts ==
Thermal bridging can result in increased energy required to heat or cool a conditioned space due to winter heat loss and summer heat gain. At interior locations near thermal bridges, occupants may experience thermal discomfort due to temperature differences. Moreover, thermal bridges on window assemblies can cause ice buildup on the glass and frames, leading to material deterioration, mold growth, and higher energy costs.

When the temperature difference between indoor and outdoor spaces is large and warm, humid air is present indoors, as often happens in winter, condensation can form on the cooler interior surfaces at thermal bridge locations. This condensation may ultimately cause mold growth, poor indoor air quality, and insulation degradation, which reduces insulation performance and causes inconsistent thermal protection throughout the building envelope. Condensation can also lead to "ghosting" (thermal tracking) in single-family homes, where dust or soot adheres to interior walls and causes dark markings in the cold areas, such as stripes on a wallboard surface adjacent to steel studs.

== Reduction ==
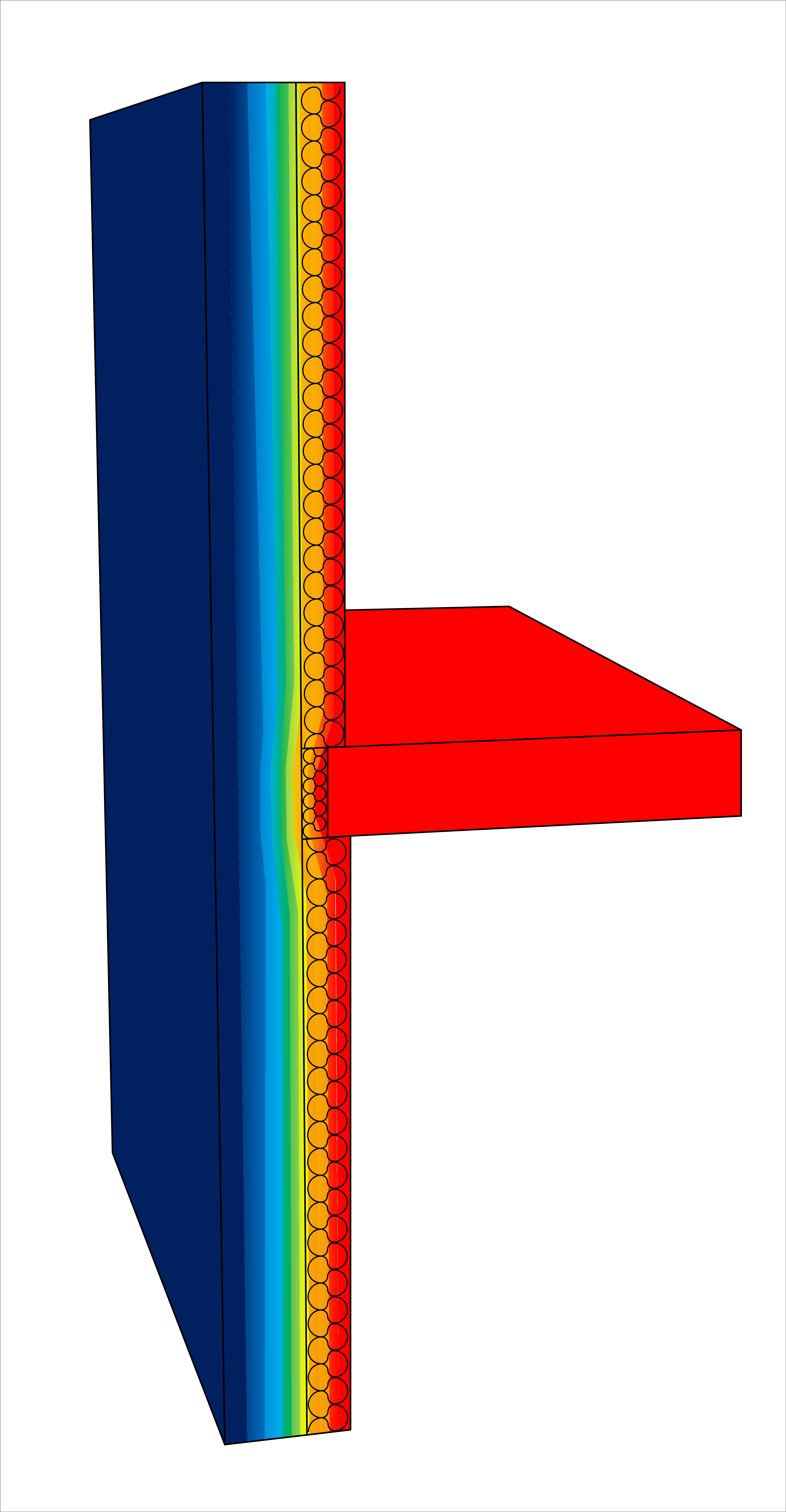
Example of using insulation to minimize thermal bridging

There are several methods that have been proven to reduce or eliminate thermal bridging depending on the cause, location, and the construction type. The objective of these methods is to either create a thermal break where a building component would span from exterior to interior otherwise, or to reduce the number of building components spanning from exterior to interior. These strategies include:

- A continuous thermal insulation layer in the thermal envelope, such as with rigid foam board insulation
- Lapping of insulation where direct continuity is not possible
- Double and staggered wall assemblies
- Structural insulated panels (SIPs) and insulating concrete forms (ICFs)
- Reducing framing factor by eliminating unnecessary framing members, such as implemented with advanced framing
- Raised heel trusses at wall-to-roof junctions to increase insulation depth
- Quality insulation installation without voids or compressed insulation
- Installing double or triple pane windows with gas filler and low-emissivity coating
- Installing windows with thermally broken frames made of low conductivity material

== Analysis methods and challenges ==
Due to their significant impacts on heat transfer, correctly modeling the impacts of thermal bridges is important to estimate overall energy use. Thermal bridges are characterized by multi-dimensional heat transfer, and therefore they cannot be adequately approximated by steady-state one-dimensional (1D) models of calculation typically used to estimate the thermal performance of buildings in most building energy simulation tools. Steady state heat transfer models are based on simple heat flow where heat is driven by a temperature difference that does not fluctuate over time so that heat flow is always in one direction. This type of 1D model can substantially underestimate heat transfer through the envelope when thermal bridges are present, resulting in lower predicted building energy use.

The currently available solutions are to enable two-dimensional (2D) and three-dimensional (3D) heat transfer capabilities in modeling software or, more commonly, to use a method that translates multi-dimensional heat transfer into an equivalent 1D component to use in building simulation software. This latter method can be accomplished through the equivalent wall method in which a complex dynamic assembly, such as a wall with a thermal bridge, is represented by a 1D multi-layered assembly that has equivalent thermal characteristics.

== See also ==
- Damp proofing
- Thermal conduction
- Building science
- Thermography
- Heat transfer
