= Insulated siding =

Insulated siding is home siding that includes rigid foam insulation, fused behind the exterior surface of the wall, for the purpose of reducing energy consumption, increasing the insulation value of the wall system and improving the stability and appearance of the siding. Currently, insulated siding is commercially available as a type of vinyl siding.

== Usage ==
Insulated siding is exterior cladding that features a rigid foam backing secured to vinyl siding, or placed behind the siding during installation.

One purported benefit of insulated siding is its ability to reduce energy transfer, which helps maintain the interior temperature of a home. Producers report an average R-value of 2.0 - 5.5, significantly more than that of other siding products including fiber cement, brick and stucco. Homeowners also report insulated siding serves as a noise barrier to external sound. Insulated vinyl siding with added fan fold foam board insulation raises the R-value to 3.5 - 7.5. Fan fold insulation is installed under the final siding product.

The expanded polystyrene foam (EPS) insulation allows for more impact resistance than traditional vinyl siding. The rigid foam-backed siding creates straighter sight lines, and prevents denting and bending, for a more wood-like appearance than traditional vinyl siding.

== History ==
Insulated siding was invented in 1992 by Ohio-based Progressive Foam Technologies, Inc. The company began marketing its product, Fullback Thermal Support System, in the United States as an improvement over traditional vinyl siding.

Initial versions of insulated vinyl siding were field-tested in Georgia. Between 1993 and 1997, design and process solutions were developed to improve the functionality and durability of the product. In 1997, one vinyl siding manufacturer launched the first full-scale commercialization of insulated vinyl siding. Between 1998 and 2003, most other vinyl siding manufacturers launched their own brands of insulated siding. Since 2003, product development and product line extensions have allowed insulated siding to experience consistent growth and recognition as a premium residential cladding.

Insulated siding is currently available from a variety of siding manufacturers including Alside, Associated Materials, CertainTeed, Cornerstone Building Brands, Exterior Portfolio by Crane, Heartland Building Products, KP Building Products, Mastic, Mitten, Inc., Norandex/Reynolds, Gentek/Revere, RMC/Style Crest, Variform and Vytec.

== Product Attributes ==
=== Environmental Impact ===
Described by developers as “green building”, insulated siding may be used by homeowners to make homes more environmentally friendly. By reducing energy consumption, insulated siding can reduce air pollution. Insulated siding has an industry system R-value range of 2.0 - 5.5. According to manufacturers, insulated siding is manufactured to last for 50 years or more, potentially reducing landfill contributions.

In addition to reducing energy consumption, manufacturers report that insulated siding is permeable or “breathable,” allowing water vapor to escape, which can provide protection against rot, mold and mildew and help maintain healthy indoor air quality. Some products also include an organic, non-toxic termite and insect repellent.

=== Specifications ===
Sizes will vary by manufacturer depending on the insulated siding application and range from 4–16 ft long with widths from 6-21 inches, depending on the profile.

Considered a pioneering category of products, the rigid foam insulation is made of a modified expanded polystyrene (EPS), which includes a brominated fire retardant called HBCD (hexabromocyclododecane) which promotes self extinguishing once removed from direct flame. The EPS used in insulated siding has a density of 1.0 lb/cu ft (16 kg/cu m). Depending on the siding profile, products range in thickness from 75mm to 200mm.

=== Durability ===
The rigid foam insulation fused behind the siding panel reportedly makes insulated siding more durable than traditional vinyl siding. The rigid foam backing is precisely fitted to the contours of the siding's exterior surface, preventing the vinyl component of insulated siding from sagging, warping or shifting. Manufacturers claim that insulated siding is not susceptible to distortions caused by freeze/thaw cycles. Contractors report that it creates straighter lines and lays flatter, making it more effective on irregular walls.
