= Siding (construction) =

Exterior cladding on building walls

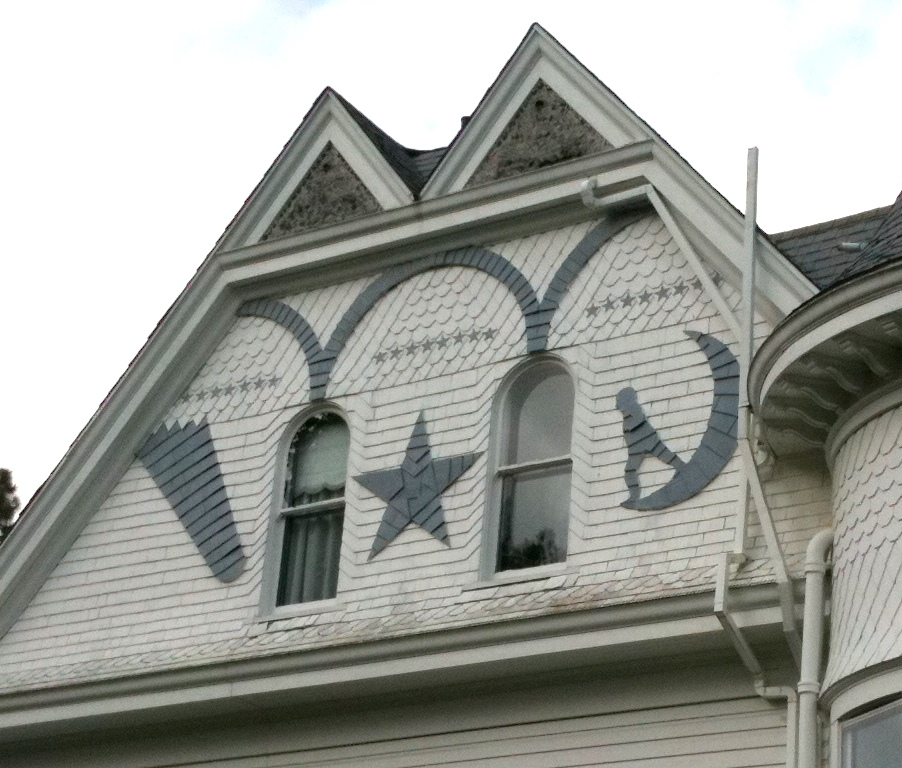
Highly decorative wood-shingle siding on a house in Clatskanie, Oregon, U.S.

Siding or wall cladding is the protective material attached to the exterior side of a wall of a house or other building. Along with the roof, it forms the first line of defense against the elements, most importantly sun, rain/snow, heat and cold, thus creating a stable, more comfortable environment on the interior side. The siding material and style also influence a building's appearance and architectural character. There is a wide and expanding variety of materials to side with, both natural and artificial, each with its own benefits and drawbacks. Masonry walls as such do not require siding, but any wall can be sided. Walls that are internally framed, whether with wood, or steel I-beams, however, must always be sided.

Most siding consists of pieces of weather-resistant material that are smaller than the wall they cover, to allow for expansion and contraction of the materials due to moisture and temperature changes. There are various styles of joining the pieces, from board and batten, in which the butt joints between panels are covered with a thin strip (usually 25 to 50 mm wide) of wood, to a variety of clapboard, also called lap siding, in which planks are laid horizontally across the wall starting from the bottom, and building up, the board below overlapped by the board above it. These techniques of joinery are designed to prevent water from entering the walls. Siding that does not consist of pieces joined would include stucco, which is widely used in the Southwestern United States. It is a plaster-like siding and is applied over a lattice, just like plaster. However, because of the lack of joints, it eventually cracks and is susceptible to water damage. Rainscreen construction is used to improve siding's ability to keep walls dry.

== Wood siding ==
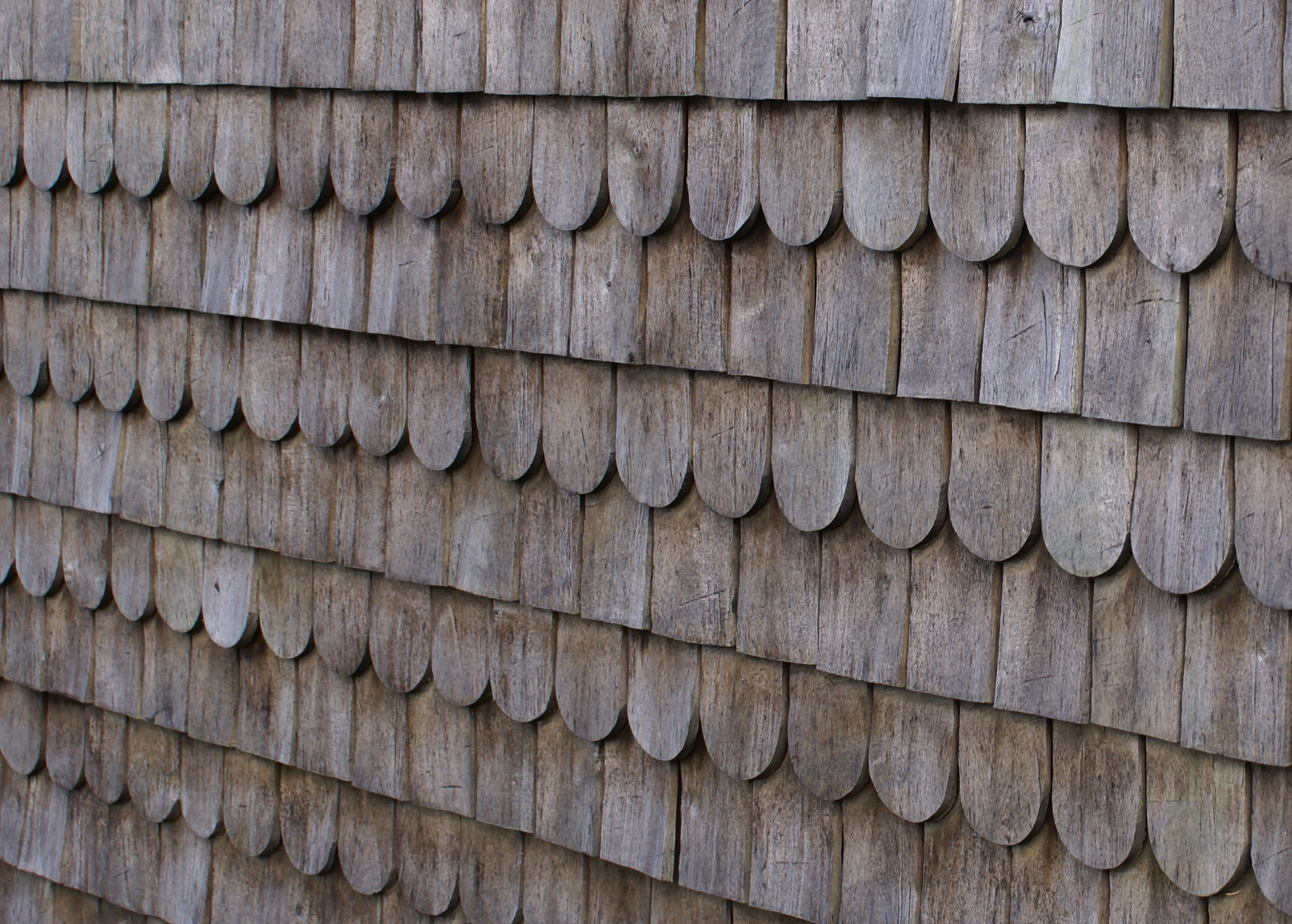
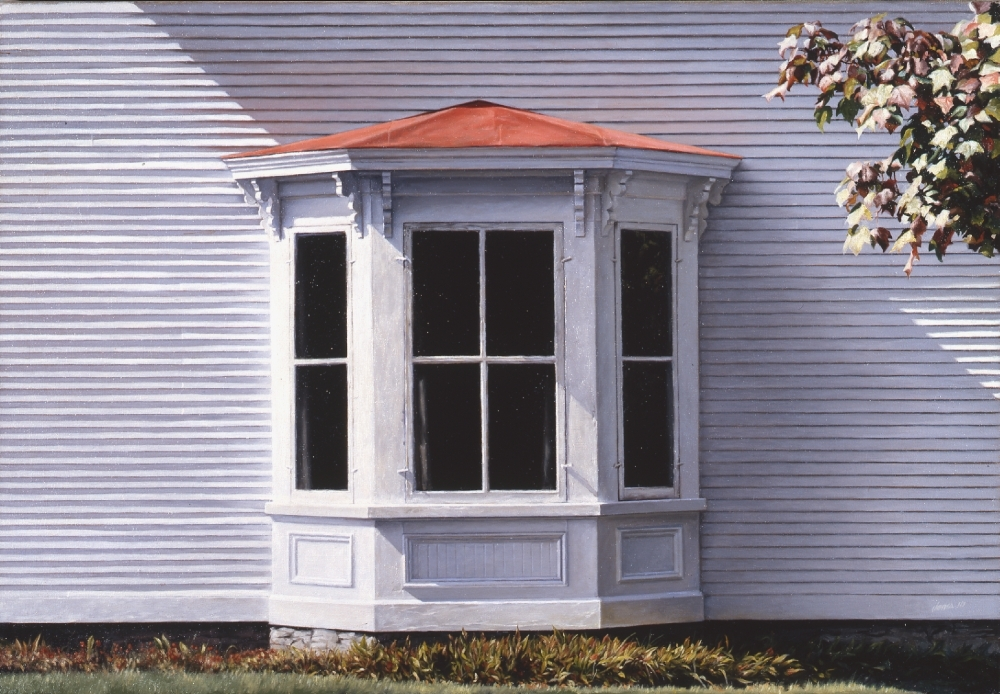
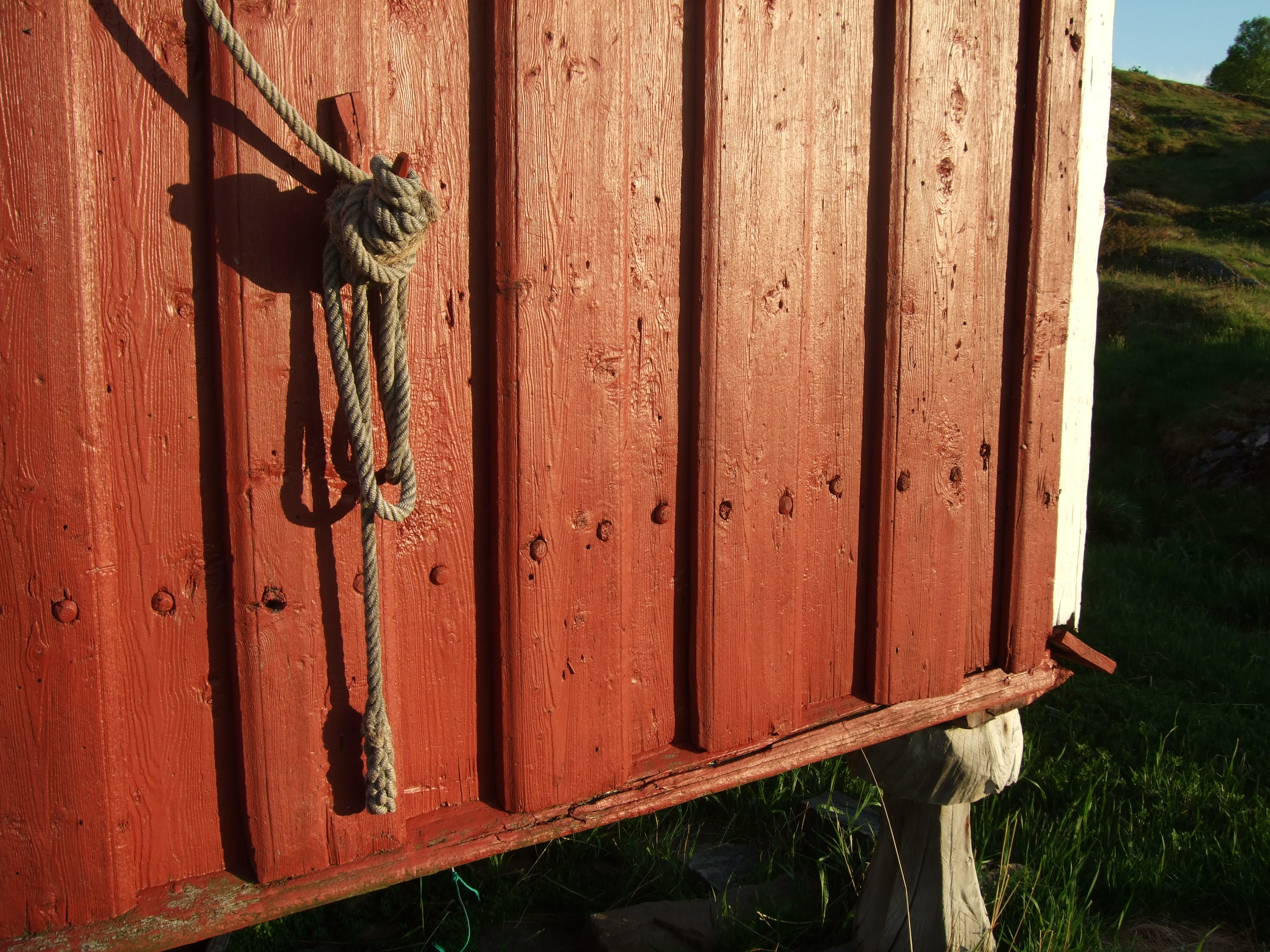
Left: Wood shingles; Center: Clapboard; Right: Board and batten.

Wood siding is very versatile in style and can be used on a wide variety of building structures. It can be painted or stained in any color palette desired.

Though installation and repair is relatively simple, wood siding requires more maintenance than other popular solutions, requiring treatment every four to nine years depending on the severity of the elements to which it is exposed. Ants and termites are a threat to many types of wood siding, such that extra treatment and maintenance is required that can significantly increase the cost in some pest-infested areas.

Wood is a moderately renewable resource and is biodegradable. However, most paints and stains used to treat wood are not environmentally friendly and can be toxic. Wood siding can provide some minor insulation and structural properties as compared to thinner cladding materials.

=== Shingles ===
Wood shingles or irregular cedar "shake" siding was used in early New England construction, and was revived in Shingle Style and Queen Anne style architecture in the late 19th century.

=== Clapboards ===
Clapboard is wood siding in overlapping horizontal rows or "courses." This is made with beveled boards, thin at the top edge and thick at the butt.

In colonial North America, Eastern white pine was the most common material. Wood siding can also be made of naturally rot-resistant woods such as redwood or cedar.

=== Drop siding ===
Jointed horizontal siding (also called "drop" siding or novelty siding) may be shiplapped or tongue and grooved (though less common). Drop siding comes in a wide variety of face finishes, including Dutch Lap (also called German or Cove Lap) and log siding (milled with curve).

=== Vertical boards ===
Vertical siding may have a cover over the joint: board and batten, popular in American wooden Carpenter Gothic houses; or less commonly behind the joint called batten and board or reversed board and batten.

=== Wooden sheet siding ===
Plywood sheet siding is sometimes used on inexpensive buildings, sometimes with grooves to imitate vertical shiplap siding. One example of such grooved plywood siding is the type called Texture 1–11, T1-11, or T111 ("tee-one-eleven"). There is also a product known as reverse board-and-batten RBB that looks similar but has deeper grooves. Some of these products may be thick enough and rated for structural applications if properly fastened to studs. Both T-11 and RBB sheets are quick and easy to install as long as they are installed with compatible flashing at butt joints.

== Stone siding ==
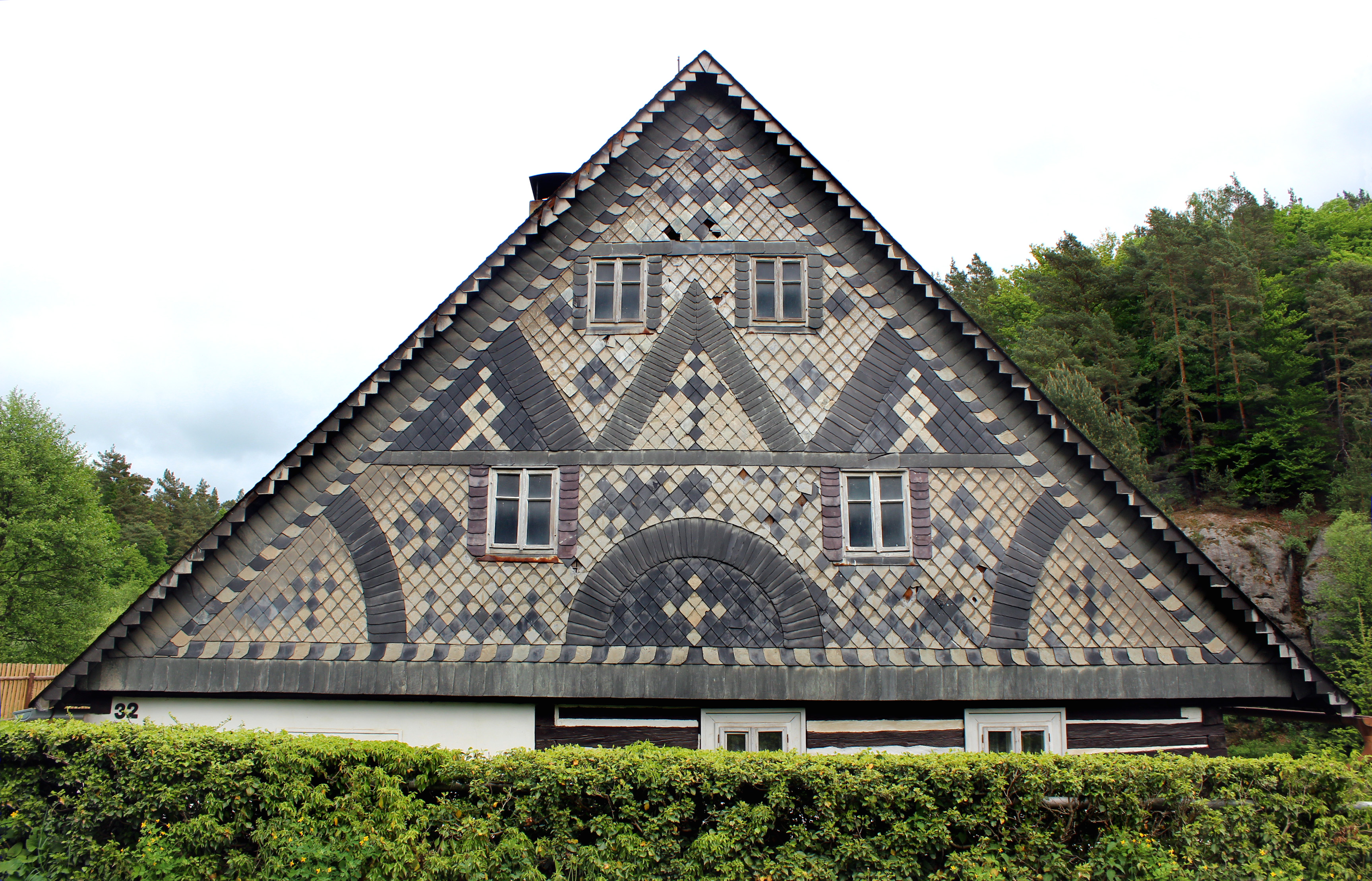
Slate wall shingles with a decorative pattern

Slate shingles may be simple in form but many buildings with slate siding are highly decorative.

== Plastic siding ==
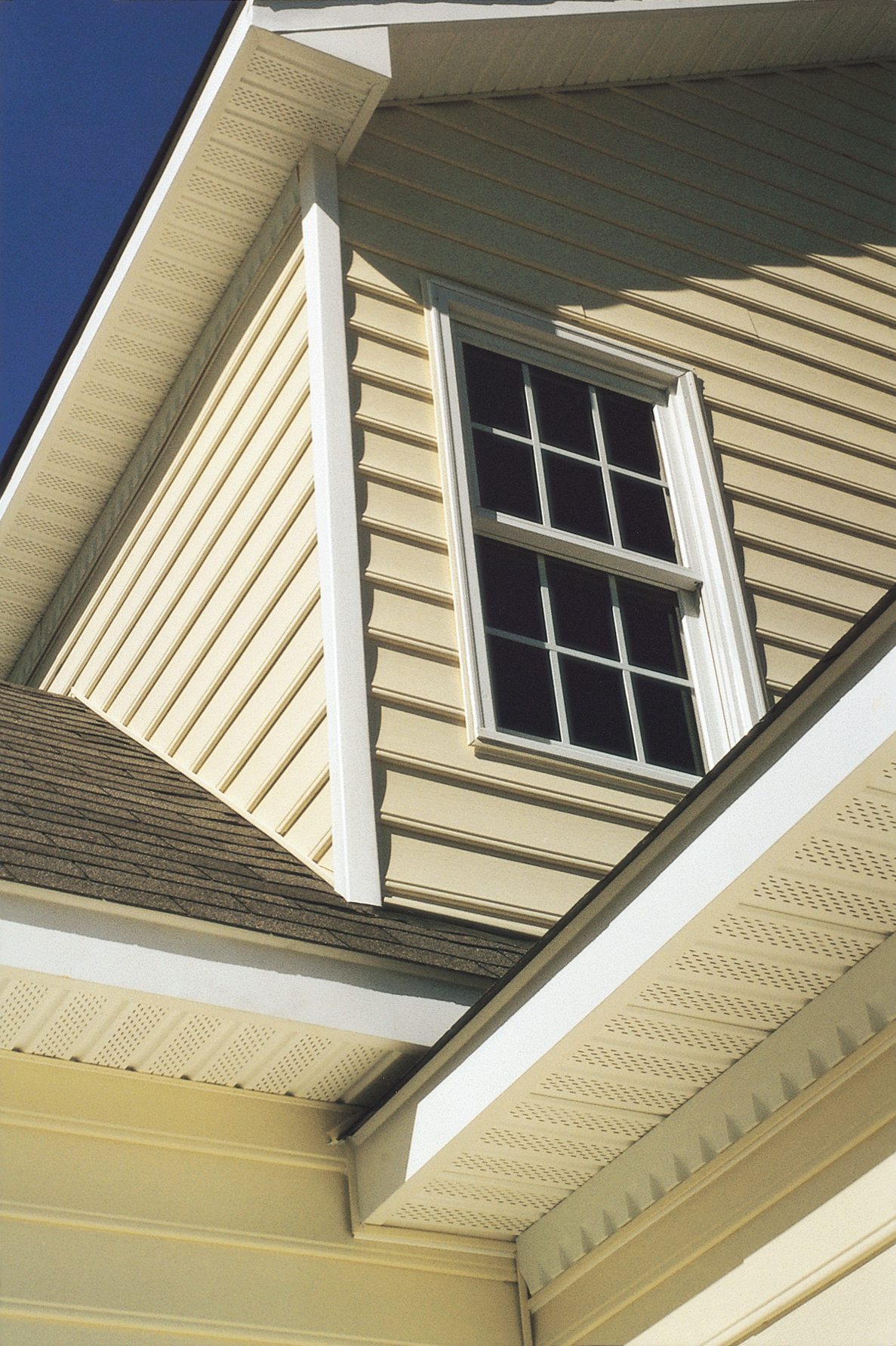
Vinyl siding

Wood clapboard is often imitated using vinyl siding or uPVC weatherboarding. It is usually produced in units twice as high as clapboard. Plastic imitations of wood shingle and wood shakes also exist.

Since plastic siding is a manufactured product, it may come in unlimited color choices and styles. Historically vinyl sidings would fade, crack and buckle over time, requiring the siding to be replaced. However, newer vinyl options have improved and resist damage and wear better. Vinyl siding is sensitive to direct heat from grills, barbecues or other sources. Unlike wood, vinyl siding does not provide additional insulation for the building, unless an insulation material (e.g., foam) has been added to the product. It has also been criticized by some fire safety experts for its heat sensitivity. This sensitivity makes it easier for a house fire to jump to neighboring houses in comparison to materials such as brick, metal or masonry.

Vinyl siding has a potential environmental cost. While vinyl siding can be recycled, it cannot be burned (due to toxic dioxin gases that would be released). If dumped in a landfill, plastic siding does not break down quickly.

Some installers and homeowners consider visible seams between vinyl siding panels an aesthetic drawback, and note that seams can be positioned to be less visible from primary viewpoints.

== Imitation brick or stone–asphalt siding ==
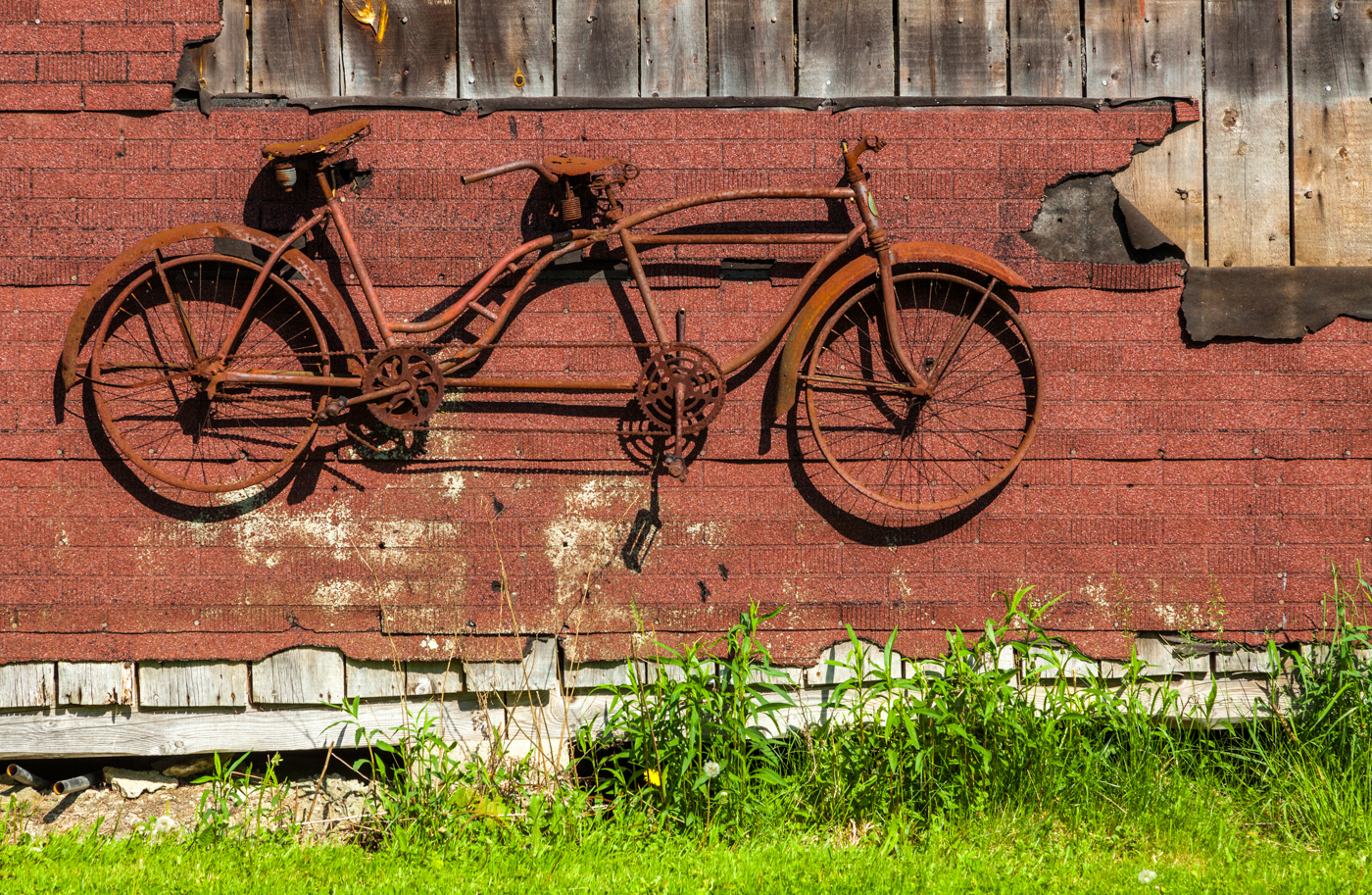
Deteriorated imitation brick asphalt siding

A predecessor to modern maintenance free sidings was asphalt brick siding. Asphalt impregnated panels (about 2 by 4 ft or 0.61 by 1.22 m) give the appearance of brick or even stone. Many buildings have this siding, especially old sheds and garages. If the panels are straight and level and not damaged, the only indication that they are not real brick may be seen at the corner caps. Trademarked names included Insulbrick, Insulstone, Insulwood. Commonly used names now are faux brick, lick-it-and-stick-it brick, and ghetto brick. Often such siding is now covered with newer metal or plastic siding. Today thin panels of real brick are manufactured for veneer or siding.

== Insulated siding ==
Insulated siding has emerged as a new siding category in recent years. Considered an improvement over vinyl siding, insulated siding is custom fit with expanded polystyrene foam (EPS) that is fused to the back of the siding, which fills the gap between the home and the siding.

Products provide environmental advantages by reducing energy use by up to 20 percent. On average, insulated siding products have an R-value of 3.96, triple that of other exterior cladding materials. Insulated siding products are typically Energy Star qualified, engineered in compliance with environmental standards set by the U.S. Department of Energy and the United States Environmental Protection Agency.

In addition to reducing energy consumption, insulated siding is a durable exterior product, designed to last more than 50 years, according to manufacturers. The foam provides rigidity for a more ding- and wind-resistant siding, maintaining a quality look for the life of the products. The foam backing also creates straighter lines when hung, providing a look more like that of wood siding, while remaining low maintenance.

Manufacturers report that insulated siding is permeable or "breathable", allowing water vapor to escape, which can protect against rot, mold and mildew, and help maintain healthy indoor air quality.

== Metal siding ==
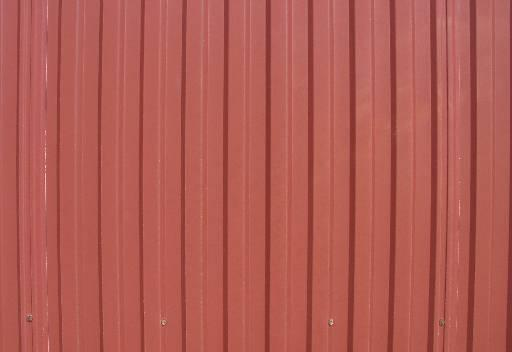
Corrugated steel siding, for the side of a barn

Metal siding comes in a variety of metals, styles, and colors. It is most often associated with modern, industrial, and retro buildings. Utilitarian buildings often use corrugated galvanized steel sheet siding or cladding, which often has a coloured vinyl finish. Corrugated aluminum cladding is also common where a more durable finish is required, while also being lightweight for easy shaping and installing making it a popular metal siding choice.

Formerly, imitation wood clapboard was made of aluminum (aluminum siding). That role is typically played by vinyl siding today. Aluminum siding is ideal for homes in coastal areas with much moisture and salt, since aluminum reacts with air to form aluminum oxide, an extremely hard coating that seals the aluminum surface from further degradation. In contrast, steel forms rust, which can weaken the structure of the material, and corrosion-resistant coatings for steel, such as zinc, sometimes fail around the edges as years pass. However, an advantage of steel siding can be its dent-resistance, which is excellent for regions with severe storms—especially if the area is prone to hail.

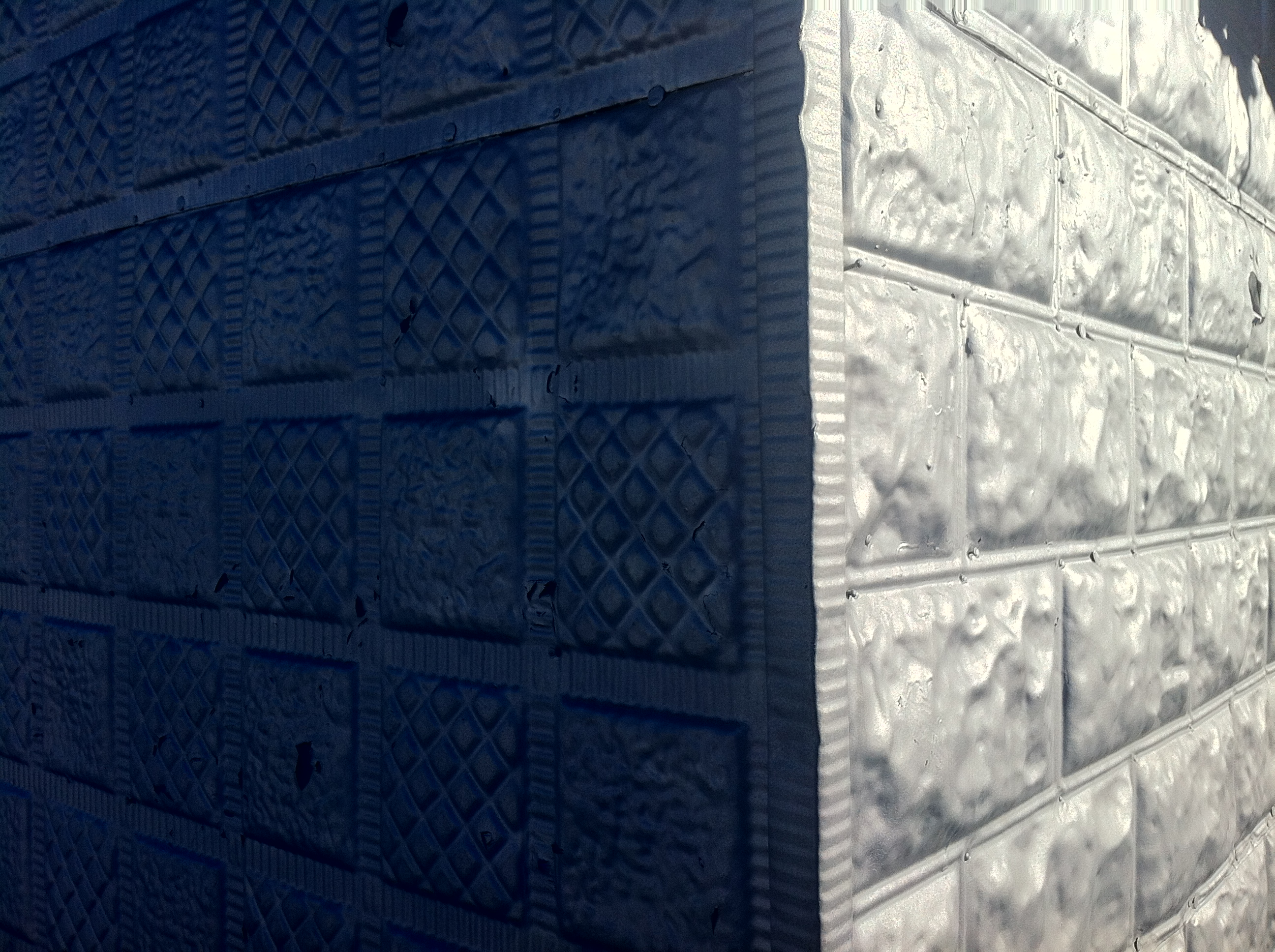
Embossed metal siding on 1890s building

The first architectural application of aluminum was the mounting of a small grounding cap on the Washington Monument in 1884. Sheet-iron or steel clapboard siding units had been patented in 1903, and Sears, Roebuck & Company had been offering embossed steel siding in stone and brick patterns in their catalogues for several years by the 1930s. Alcoa began promoting the use of aluminum in architecture by the 1920s when it produced ornamental spandrel panels for the Cathedral of Learning and the Chrysler and Empire State Buildings in New York. The exterior of the A.O. Smith Corporation Building in Milwaukee was clad entirely in aluminum by 1930, and 3-foot-square (0.91 m) siding panels of Duralumin sheet from Alcoa sheathed an experimental exhibit house for the Architectural League of New York in 1931. Most architectural applications of aluminum in the 1930s were on a monumental scale, and it was another six years before it was put to use on residential construction.

In the first few years after World War II, manufacturers began developing and widely distributing aluminum siding. Among them Indiana businessman Frank Hoess was credited with the invention of the configuration seen on modern aluminum siding. His experiments began in 1937 with steel siding in imitation of wooden clapboards. Other types of sheet metal and steel siding on the market at the time presented problems with warping, creating openings through which water could enter, introducing rust. Hoess remedied this problem through the use of a locking joint, which was formed by small flap at the top of each panel that joined with a U-shaped flange on the lower edge of the previous panel thus forming a watertight horizontal seam. After he had received a patent for his siding in 1939, Hoess produced a small housing development of about forty-four houses covered in his clapboard-style steel siding for blue-collar workers in Chicago. His operations were curtailed when war plants commandeered the industry. In 1946 Hoess allied with Metal Building Products of Detroit, a corporation that promoted and sold Hoess siding of Alcoa aluminum. Their product was used on large housing projects in the northeast and was purportedly the siding of choice for a 1947 Pennsylvania development, the first subdivision to solely use aluminum siding. Products such as 4,-6,-8-and-10-inch (100, 150, 200 and 250 mm) by 12-foot (3.7 m) unpainted aluminum panels, starter strips, corner pieces and specialized application clips were assembled in the Indiana shop of the Hoess brothers. Siding could be applied over conventional wooden clapboards, or it could be nailed to studs via special clips affixed to the top of each panel. Insulation was placed between studs. While the Hoess Brothers company continued to function for about twelve more years after the dissolution of the Metal Building Products Corporation in 1948, they were less successful than rising siding companies like Reynolds Metals.

== Thatch siding ==
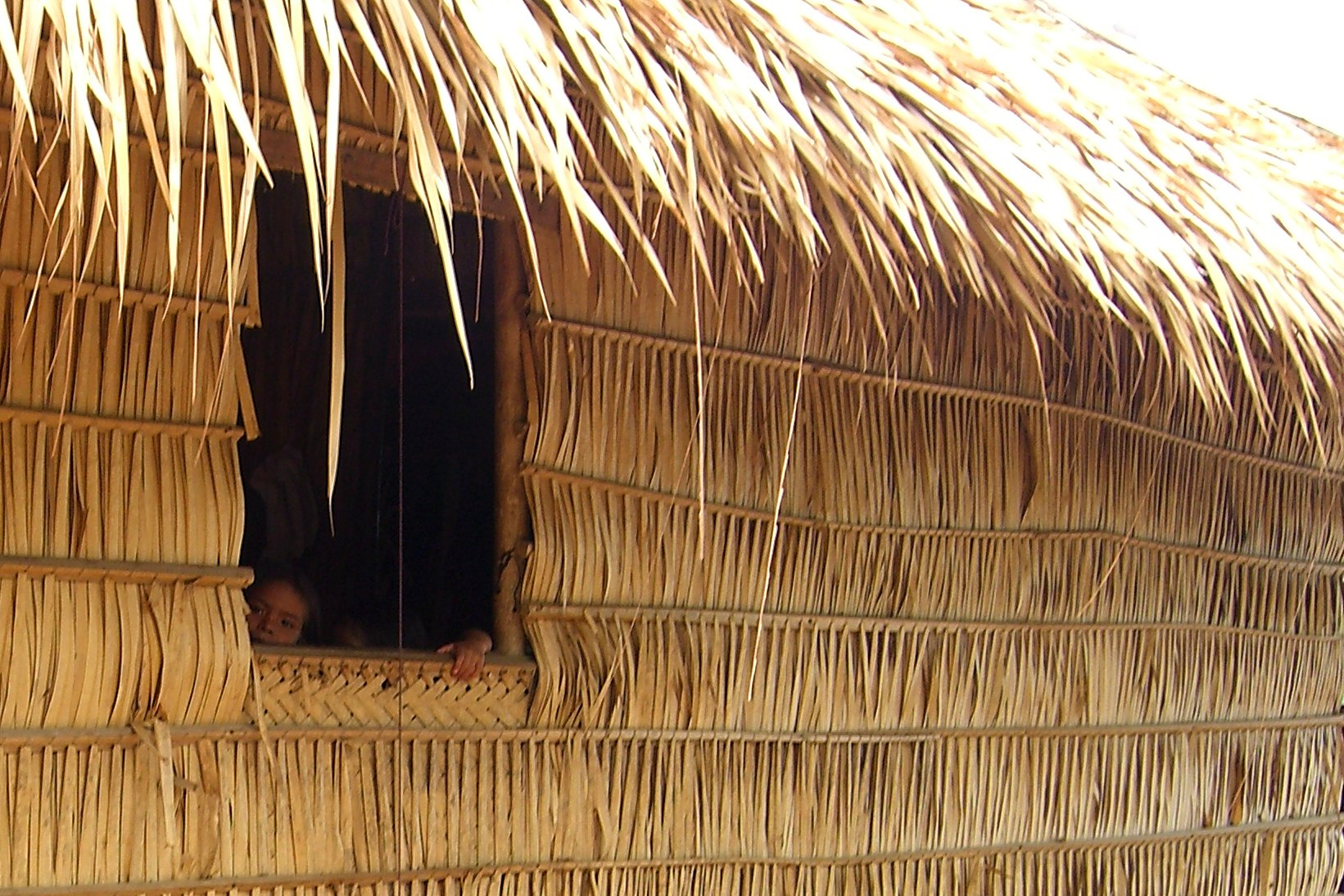
Thatched wall of home

Thatch is an ancient and very widespread building material used on roofs and walls. Thatch siding is made with dry vegetation such as longstraw, water reeds, or combed wheat reed. The materials are overlapped and weaved in patterns designed to deflect and direct water.

== Masonry siding ==
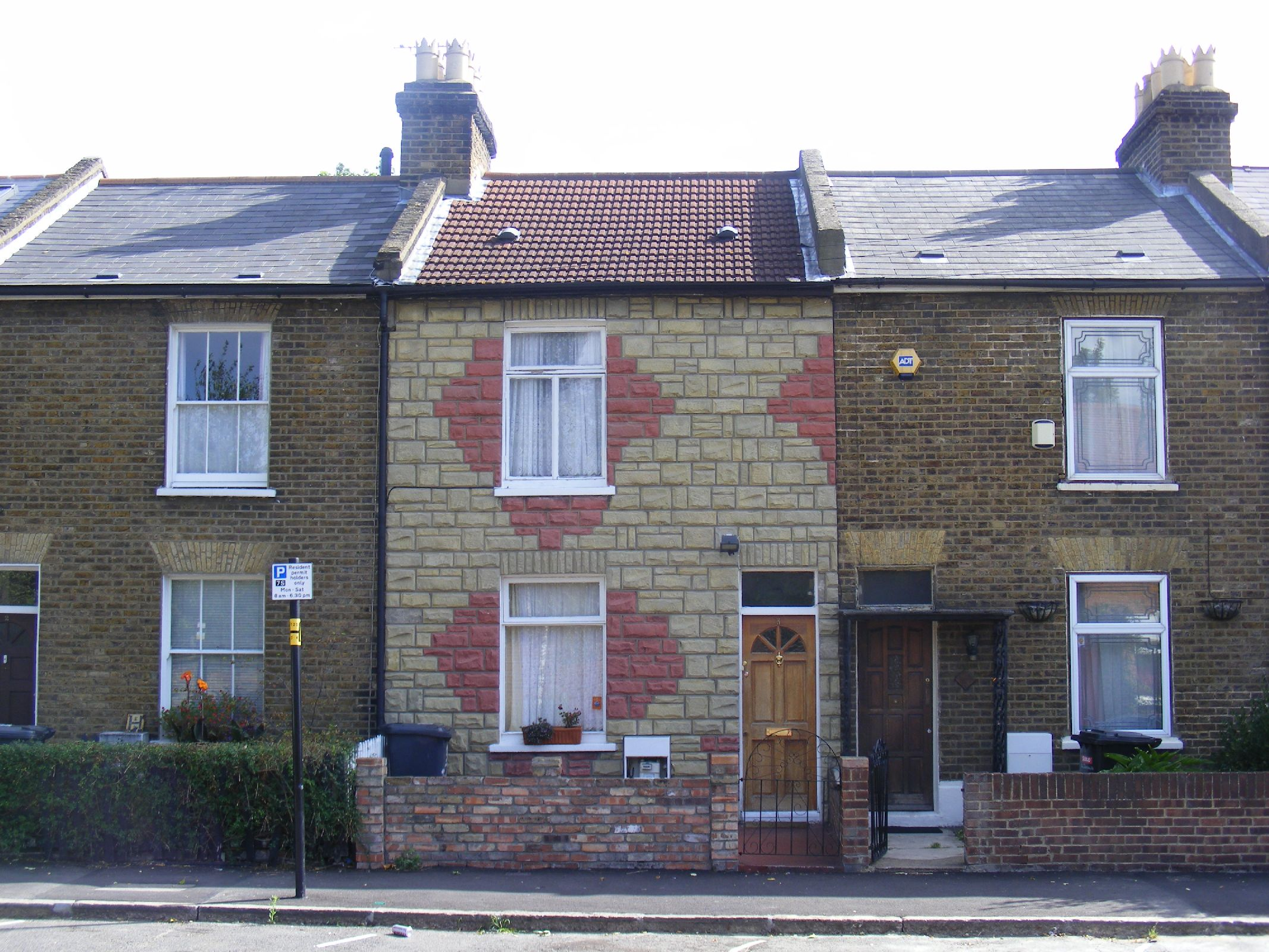
Stone cladding on center rowhouse

Stone and masonry veneer is sometimes considered siding, are varied and can accommodate a variety of styles—from formal to rustic. Though masonry can be painted or tinted to match many color palettes, it is most suited to neutral earth tones, and coatings such as roughcast and pebbeldash. Masonry has excellent durability (over 100 years), and minimal maintenance is required. The primary drawback to masonry siding is the initial cost.

Precipitation can threaten the structure of buildings, so it is important that the siding will be able to withstand the weather conditions in the local region. For rainy regions, exterior insulation finishing systems (EIFS) have been known to suffer underlying wood rot problems with excessive moisture exposure.

The environmental impact of masonry depends on the type of material used. In general, concrete and concrete based materials are intensive energy materials to produce. However, the long durability and minimal maintenance of masonry sidings mean that less energy is required over the life of the siding.

== Composite siding ==
Composite siding in clapboard form being installed

Various composite materials are also used for siding: asphalt shingles, asbestos, fiber cement, aluminum (ACM), fiberboard, hardboard, etc. They may be in the form of shingles or boards, in which case they are sometimes called clapboard.

Composite sidings are available in many styles and can mimic the other siding options. Composite materials are ideal for achieving a certain style or 'look' that may not be suited to the local environment (e.g., corrugated aluminum siding in an area prone to severe storms; steel in coastal climates; wood siding in termite-infested regions).

Costs of composites tend to be lower than wood options, but vary widely as do installation, maintenance and repair requirements. Not surprisingly, the durability and environmental impact of composite sidings depends on the specific materials used in the manufacturing process.

Fiber cement siding is a class of composite siding that is usually made from a combination of cement, cellulose (wood), sand, and water. They are either coated or painted in the factory or installed and then painted after installation. Fiber cement is popular for its realistic look, durability, low-maintenance properties, fire resistance, and its lightweight properties compared to traditional wood siding. Composite siding products containing cellulose (wood fibers) have been shown to have problems with deterioration, delamination, or loss of coating adhesion in certain climates or under certain environmental conditions.

A younger class of non-wood synthetic siding has sprouted in the past 15 years. These products are usually made from a combination of non-wood materials such as polymeric resins, fiberglass, stone, sand, and fly ash and are chosen for their durability, curb appeal, and ease of maintenance. Given the newness of such technologies, product lifespan can only be estimated, varieties are limited, and distribution is sporadic.

== See also ==
- Sod house
- Log building
- Exterior insulation finishing system
- Stucco
- Masonry
- Brick
- Concrete masonry unit
- Dry stone
