= The New Lawn (Des Moines, Iowa) =

- U.S. National Register of Historic Places
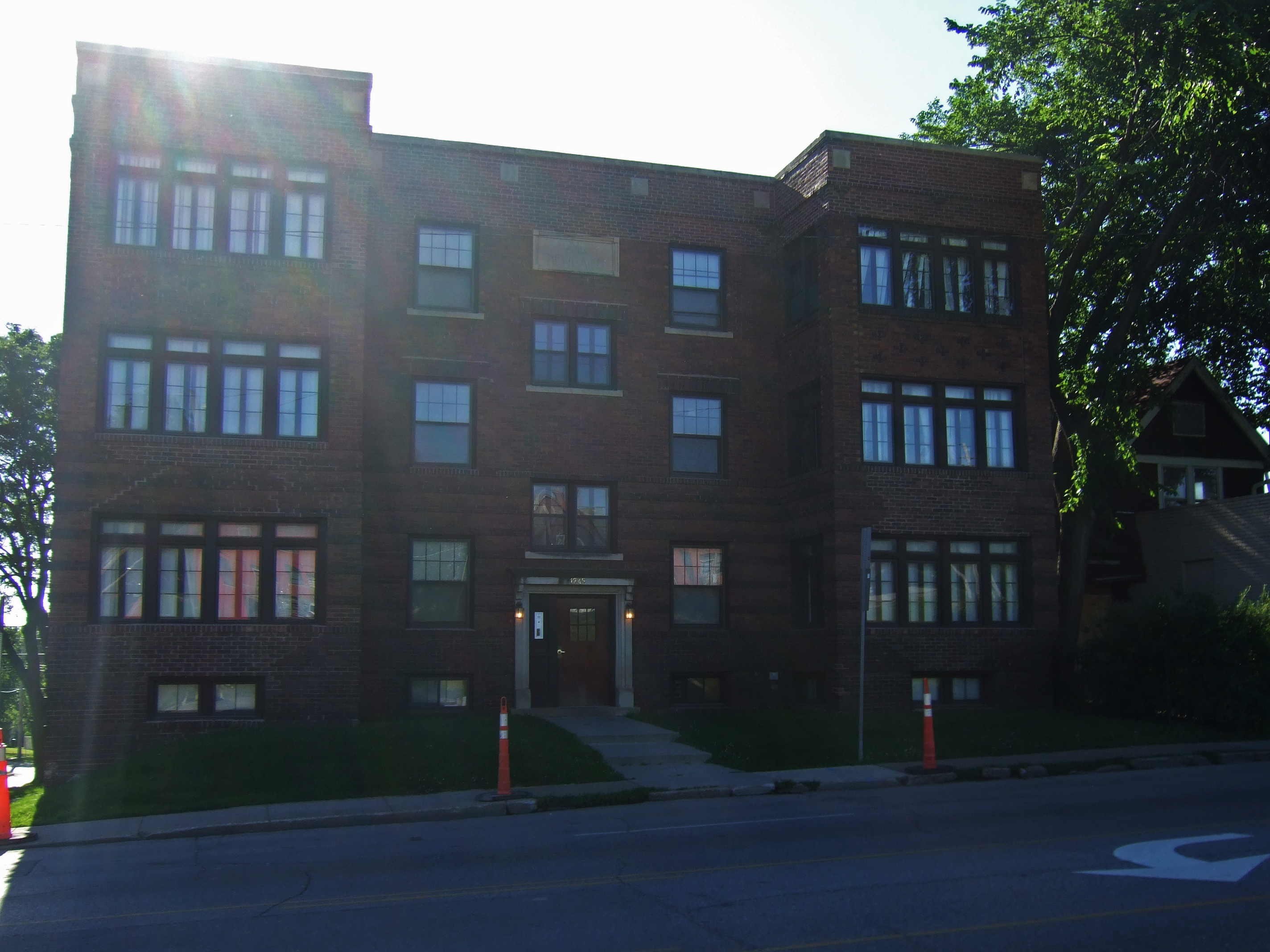

- Location within Iowa Location within the United States
- Location: 1245 6th Ave. Des Moines, Iowa
- Coordinates: 41°36′07.5″N 93°37′31.8″W
- Area: less than one acre
- Built: 1915
- Architect: Morrison and Thorne
- Architectural style: Prairie School
- MPS: Towards a Greater Des Moines MPS
- NRHP reference No.: 96001150
- Added to NRHP: October 25, 1996

The New Lawn is a historic building located in Des Moines, Iowa, United States. This three-story, brick structure was completed in 1915. It features seven units, an U-shaped plan, a symmetrical facade with projecting wings, polychrome brick veneer, a series of quadruple ribbon windows, and a flat roof. The building is located on Sixth Avenue, which by the turn of the 20th century had become a major route utilized by vehicular traffic and streetcar lines. Its proximity to this transportation corridor illustrates the emergence of higher and denser residential use in this area of Des Moines. The apartment building was listed on the National Register of Historic Places in 1996.
