= Siding =

Siding may refer to:

- Siding (construction), the outer covering or cladding of a house
- Siding (rail), a track section
