= Clapboard =

Building siding of horizontal boards

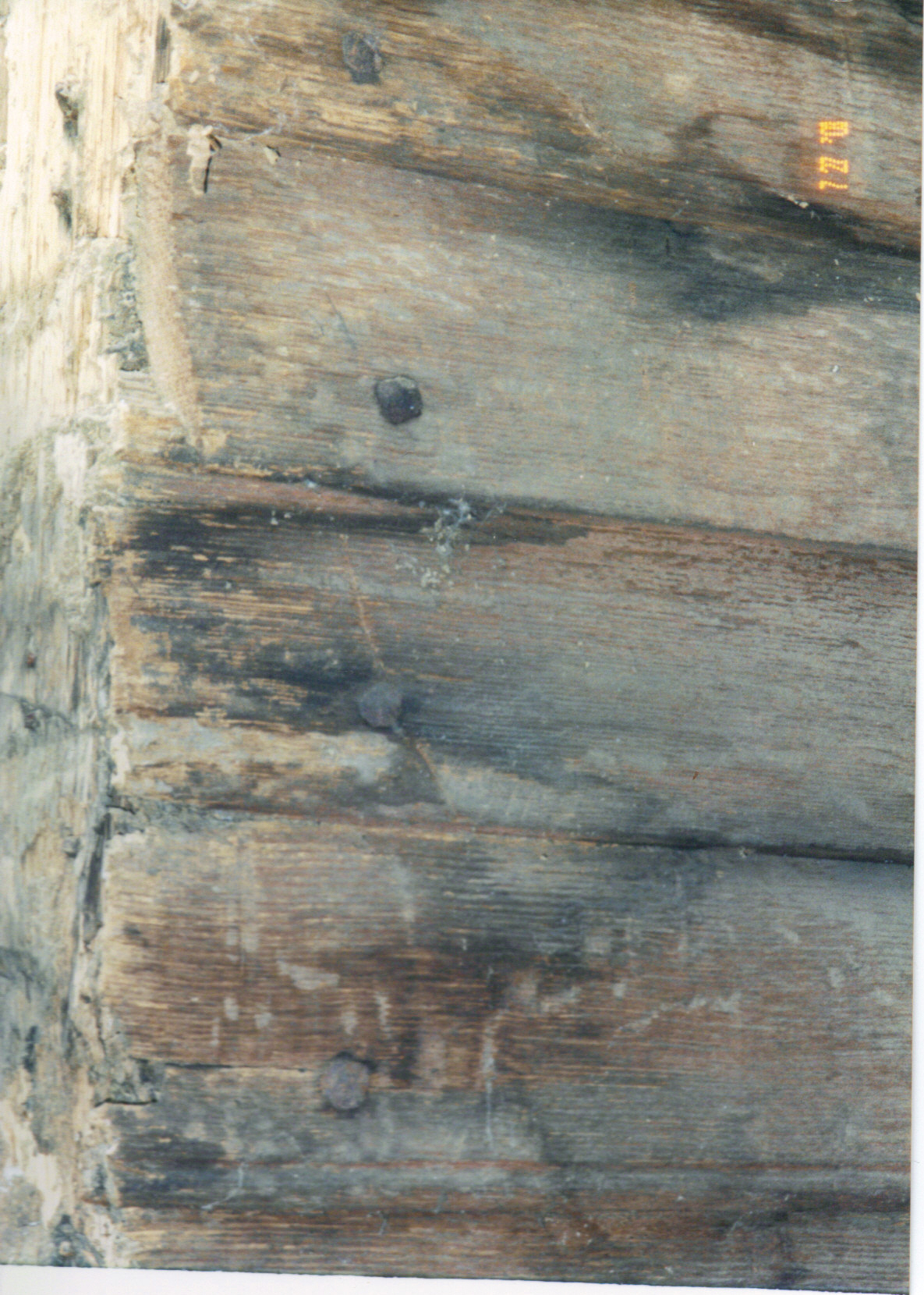
Oak clapboards lean-to attic Ephraim Hawley House, United States

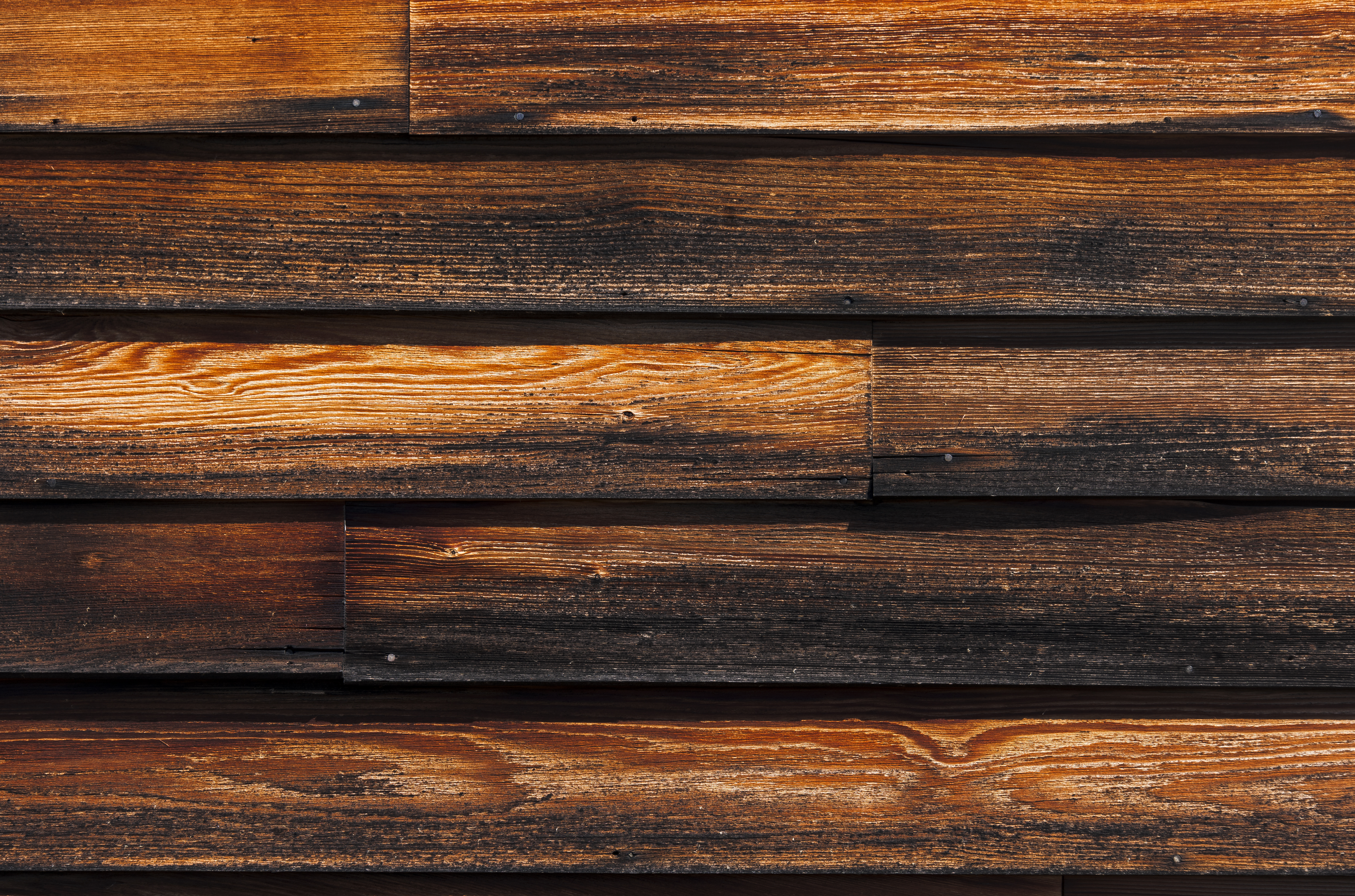
Clapboard siding stained dark brown

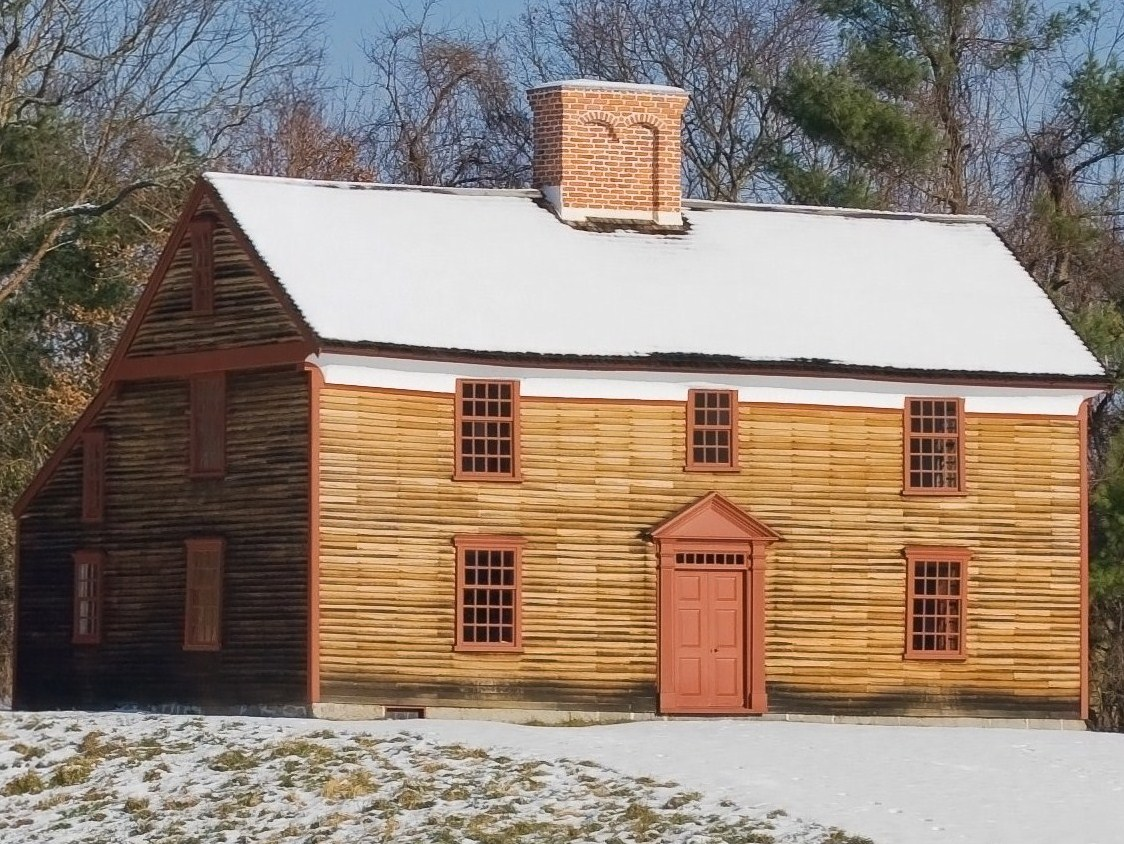
Captain William Smith House at Minute Man National Historical Park, United States, a restored saltbox house with unpainted clapboard siding

Clapboard (/ˈklæpˌbɔːrd/ or /ˈklæbərd/), also called clabbard, bevel siding, lap siding, and weatherboard, with regional variation in the definition of those terms, is wooden siding of a building in the form of horizontal boards, often overlapping.

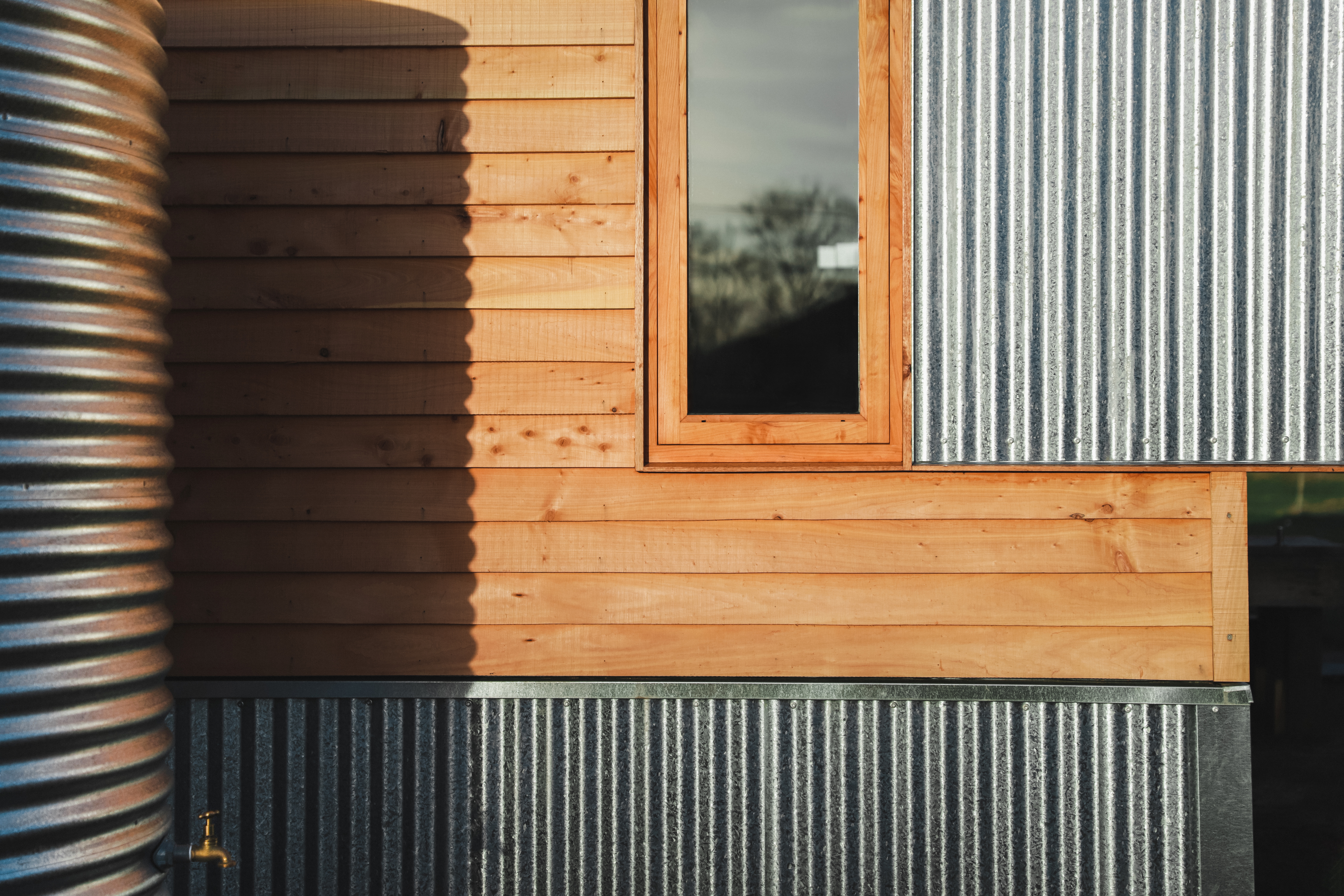
Contemporary use of clapboard/weatherboard and corrugated galvanised iron in Australia

Clapboard, in modern American usage, is a word for long, thin boards used to cover outer walls and (formerly) roofs of buildings. Historically, it has also been spelled clawboard and cloboard. In the United Kingdom, Australia and New Zealand, the term weatherboard is used. Australians also use the term chamferboard for the tongue-and-groove variant.

An older meaning of clapboard is small split pieces of oak imported from Germany for use as barrel staves, and the name is a partial translation (from klappen, "to fit") of Middle Dutch klapholt and related to German Klappholz.

== Types ==
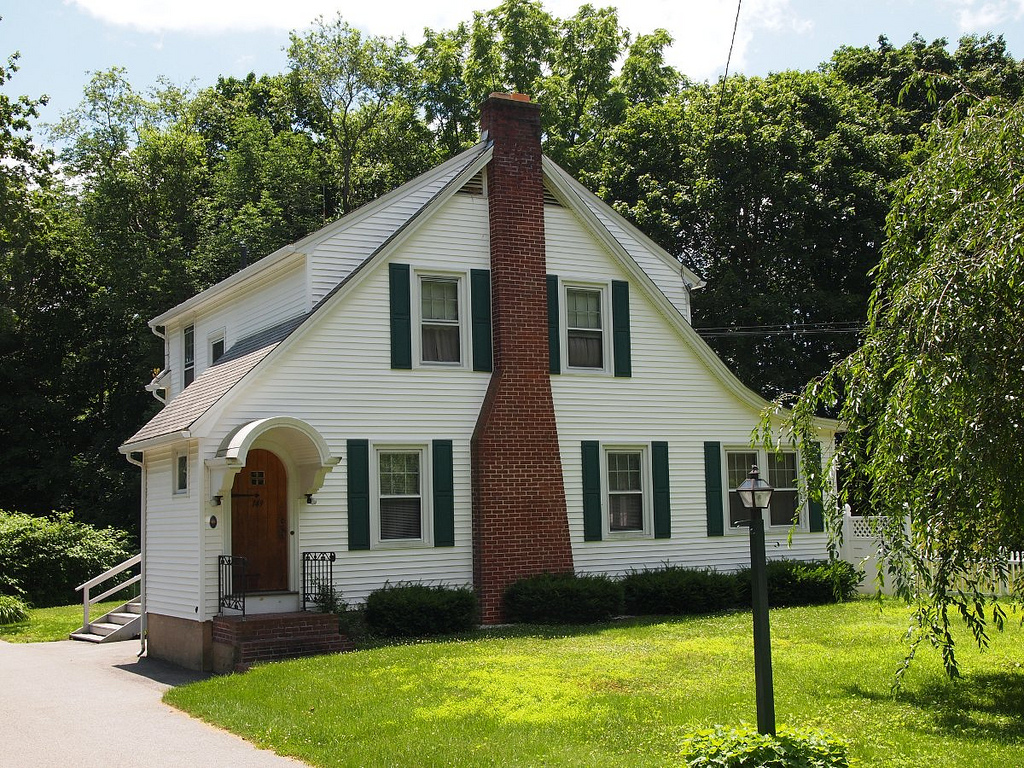
Dutch Colonial Revival house built in weatherboard in New London, Connecticut, United States

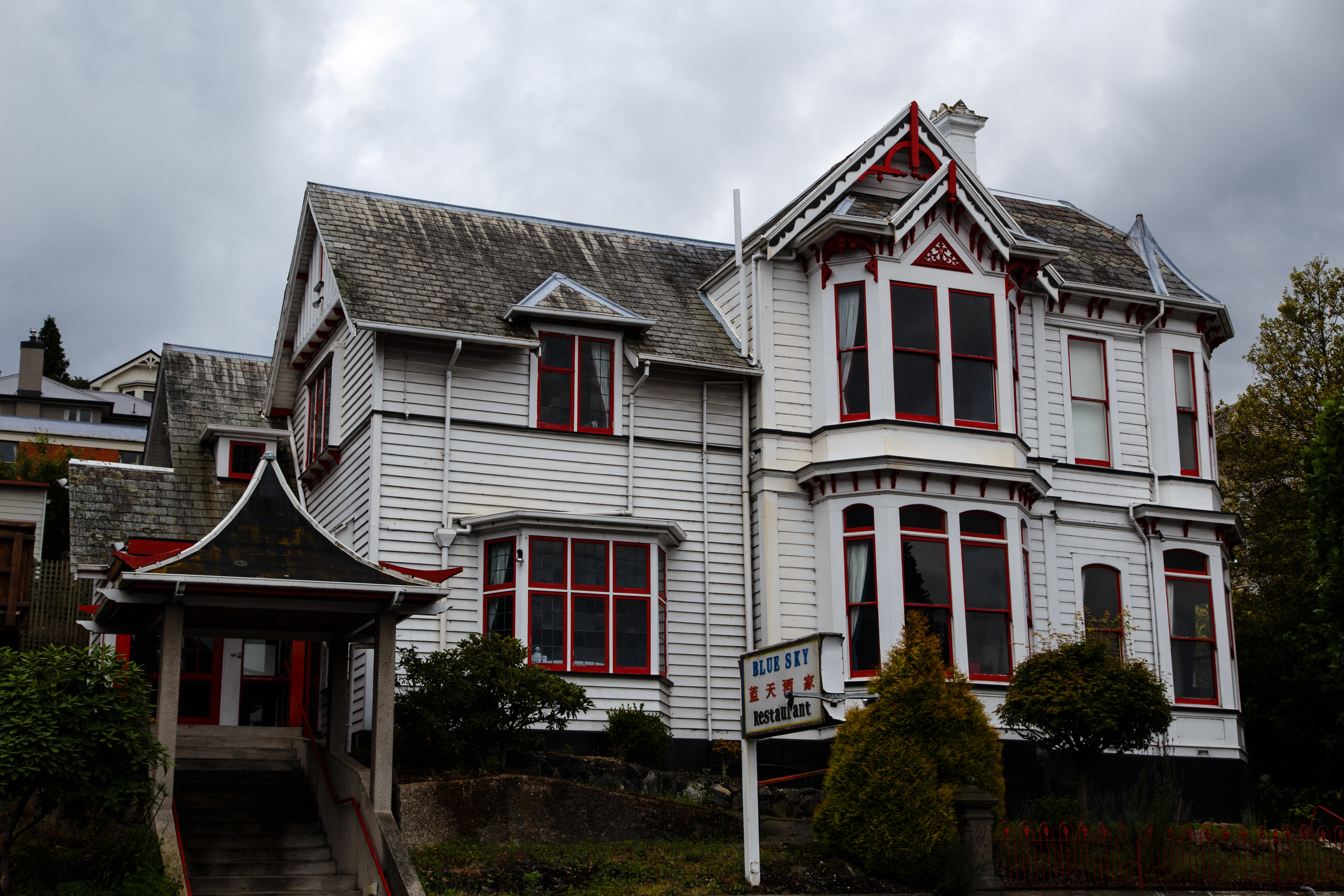
Period weatherboard house in Dunedin, New Zealand

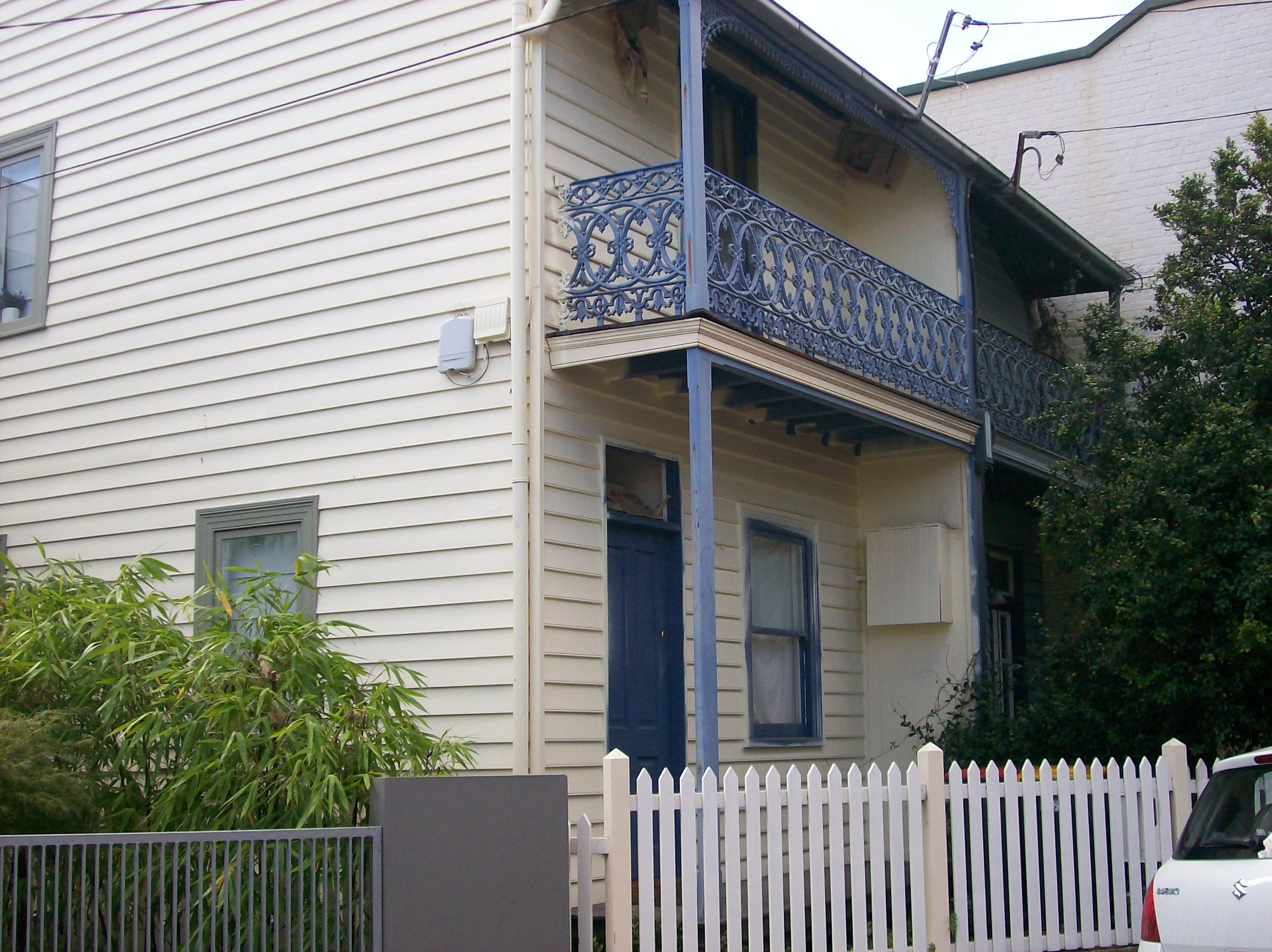
Victorian two-storey weatherboard terrace house Camperdown, New South Wales, Australia

=== Riven ===
Clapboards were originally riven radially by hand producing triangular or "feather-edged" sections, attached thin side up and overlapped thick over thin to shed water.

=== Radially sawn ===
Later, the boards were radially sawn in a type of sawmill called a clapboard mill, producing vertical-grain clapboards. The more commonly used boards in New England are vertical-grain boards. Depending on the diameter of the log, cuts are made from 4 1/2 to 6 1/2 inches (110 to 170 mm) deep along the full length of the log. Each time the log turns for the next cut, it is rotated 5/8 inch (16 mm) until it has turned 360°. This gives the radially sawn clapboard its taper and true vertical grain.

=== Flat-sawn ===
Flat-grain clapboards are cut tangent to the annual growth rings of the tree. As this technique was common in most parts of the British Isles, it was carried by immigrants to their colonies in the Americas and in Australia and New Zealand. Flat-sawn wood cups more and does not hold paint as well as radially sawn wood.

=== Chamferboard ===
Chamferboards are an Australian form of weatherboarding using tongue-and-groove joints to link the boards together to give a flatter external appearance than regular angled weatherboards.

=== Finger jointed ===
Some modern clapboards are made up of shorter pieces of wood finger jointed together with an adhesive.

== Wood species ==
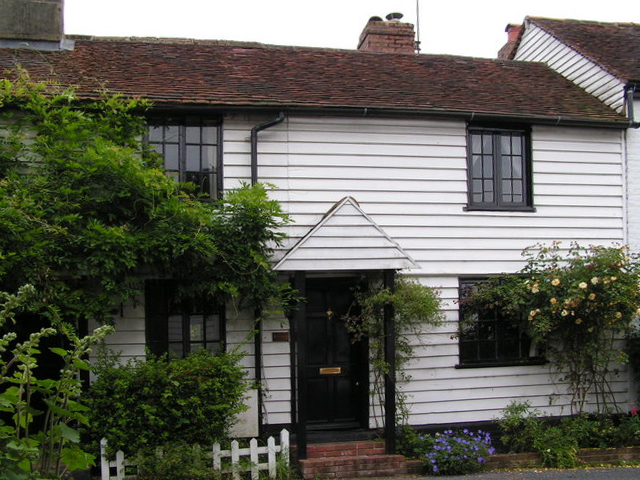
Weatherboarded cottage, Petteridge, Borough of Tunbridge Wells, Kent, England. This style of building is common in rural west Kent.

In North America clapboards were historically made of split oak, pine and spruce. Modern clapboards are available in red cedar and pine.

In some areas, clapboards were traditionally left as raw wood, relying upon good air circulation and the use of 'semi-hardwoods' to keep the boards from rotting. These boards eventually go grey as the tannins are washed out from the wood. More recently clapboard has been tarred or painted—traditionally black or white due to locally occurring minerals or pigments. In modern clapboard these colors remain popular, but with a hugely wider variety due to chemical pigments and stains.

Clapboard houses may be found in most parts of the British Isles, and the style may be part of all types of traditional building, from cottages to windmills, shops to workshops, as well as many others.

Clapboard is always referred to as weatherboard in New Zealand, where that type of cladding dominated in buildings constructed before 1960. After the big earthquakes of 1855 and 1931, wooden buildings were perceived as being less vulnerable to damage, and weatherboard walls with a corrugated iron roof was found to be a cost-effective building style.

Newer, cheaper designs often imitate the form of clapboard construction as siding made of vinyl (uPVC), aluminum, fiber cement, or other man-made materials. These materials can provide a lightweight alternative to wooden cladding.

== See also ==
- Clinker (boat building)
- Shiplap
- Siding § Wood siding
- Tongue and groove
