= Belt course =

Continuous row or layer of stones or brick set in a wall

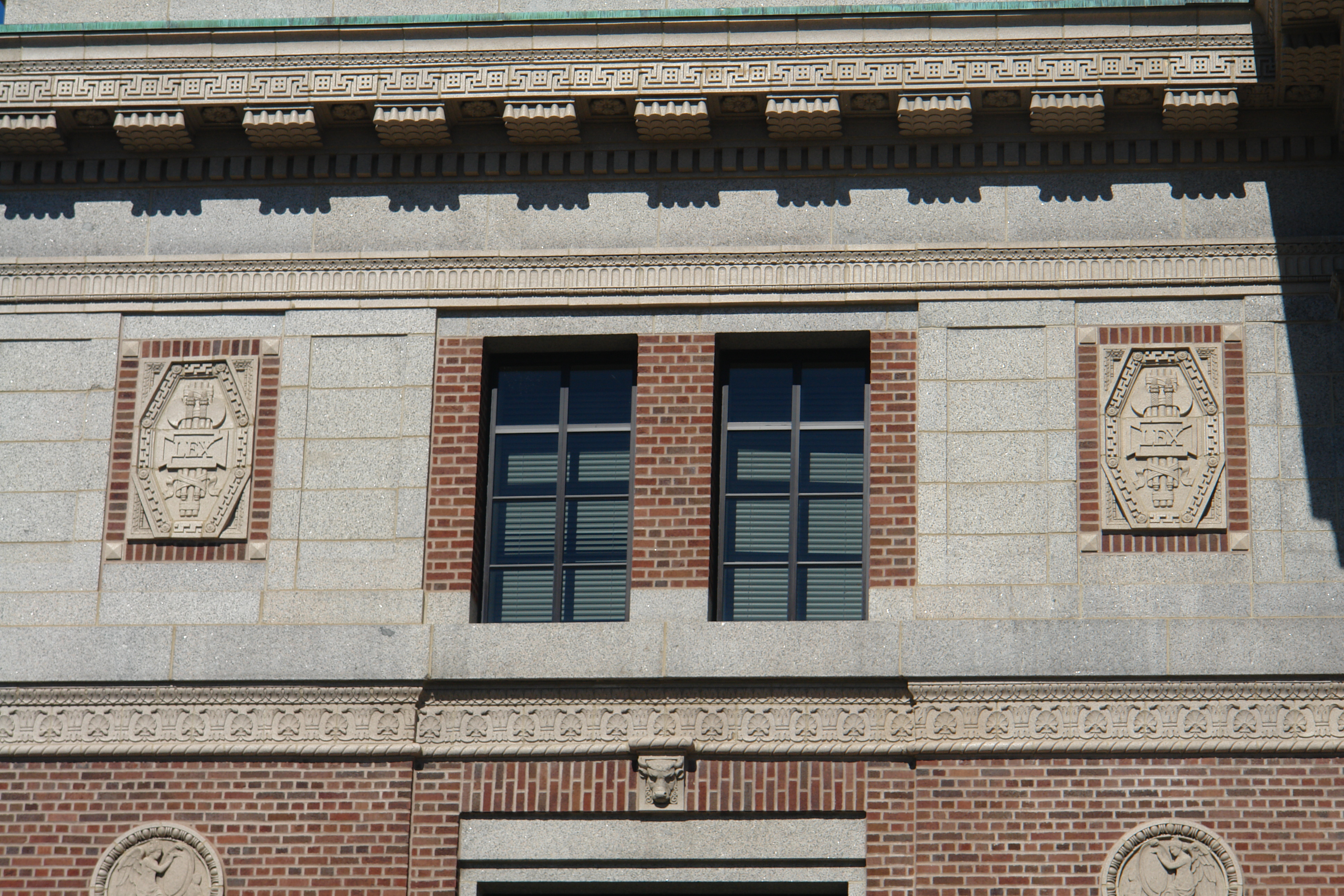
A highly decorative terra-cotta belt course between the brick and stone wall materials.

A belt course, also called a string course or sill course, is a continuous row or layer of stones or brick set in a wall. Set in line with window sills, it helps to make the horizontal line of the sills visually more prominent. Set between the floors of a house, it helps to make the separate floors distinguishable from the exterior of the building.

The belt course often projects from the side of the building. Georgian architecture is notable for the use of belt courses.

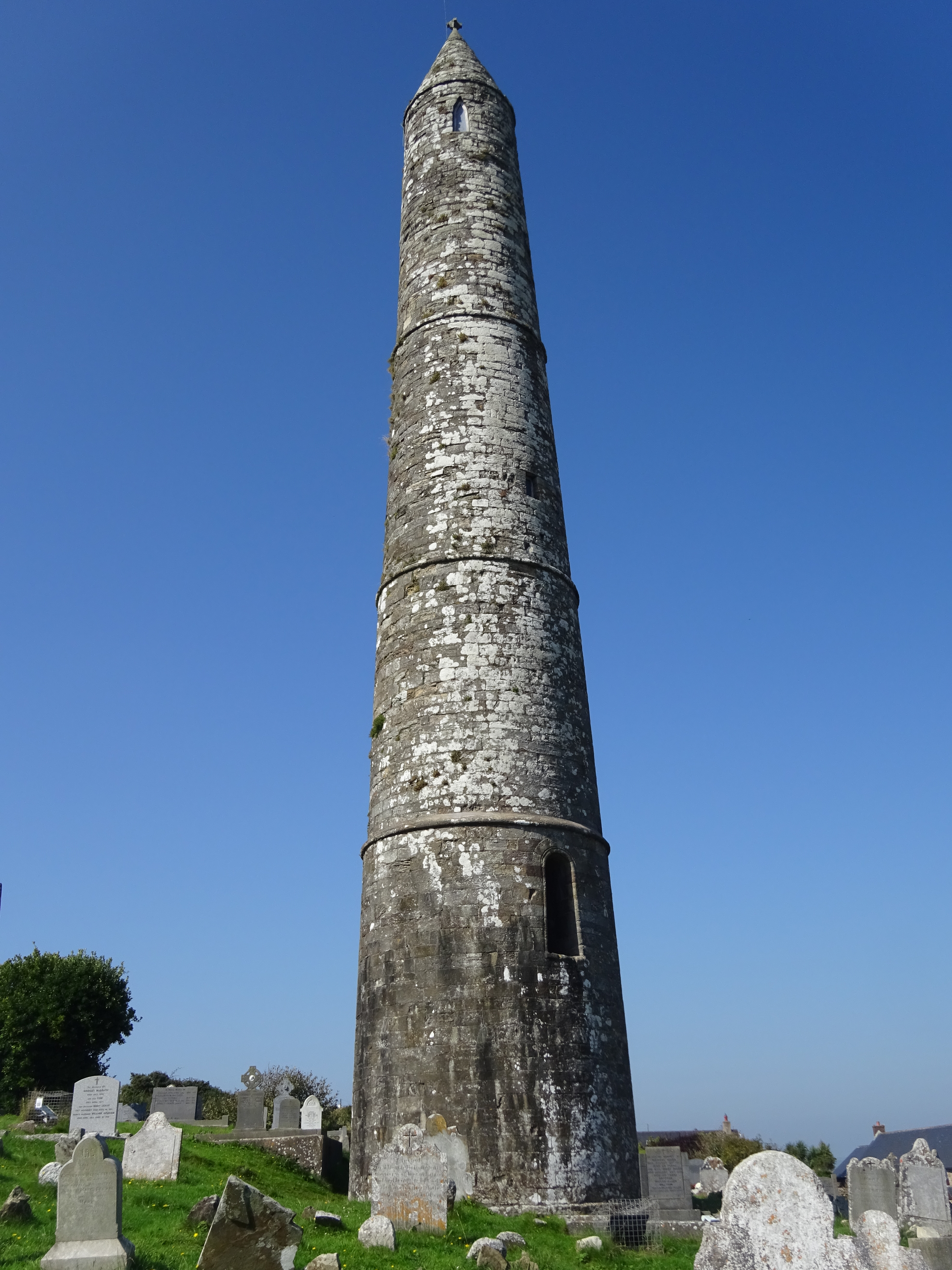
Irish round tower (Ardmore, 12th century), with storeys separated by string-courses.

Although the belt course has its origins as a structural component of a building, by the 18th century it was almost purely a decorative element and had no functional purpose. In brick or stone buildings taller than three stories, however, a shelf angle is usually used to transfer the load of the wall to a hidden, interior steel wall. Flashing is used to cover the space exposed by the shelf angle to help limit the intrusion of water. Where flashing is considered aesthetically unpleasing, a belt course is often used.

In Jamaican building construction, "belt course" or "belting" refers to a continuous concrete beam or slab that is boxed and cast across the top of the wall spanning the concrete blocks and tying in all columns to provide structural support and to carry the weight of the roof or another story. The slabs or beams across windows and doors are called "lintel" and are there for structural support.

== See also ==
- Course (architecture)
