= Shelf angle =

Engineering concept in masonry

In masonry veneer building construction, a shelf angle or masonry support is a steel angle which supports the weight of brick or stone veneer and transfers that weight onto the main structure of the building so that a gap or space can be created beneath to allow building movements to occur.

== Background ==
Traditional masonry buildings had thick Load-bearing walls that supported the weight of the building. Openings in these load bearing walls such as doors and windows were typically small and spanned by steel lintels or masonry arches.

== Modern buildings ==
The invention of skeleton frame buildings made it possible to reduce the thickness of the walls and have wide openings such as ribbon windows extending across most or all of the building facade. In these buildings, brick, stone, or other masonry cladding is often just a single wythe of material called a veneer since it is non-loadbearing. The only way to support the weight of this veneer across a wide opening is by providing a shelf angle on which the masonry bears. The shelf angle, in turn, is attached to major elements of the building structure such as floor beams or structural columns. Shelf angles are in reality a horizontal expansion joint which allows growth of the brick below the shelf angle and to allow movement or shrinkage of the frame without putting stresses on the brick veneer. In the United States, common sizes for steel shelf angles include L 3" x 3" x 1/4" and L 4" x 4" x 1/4".In the UK and Europe shelf angles / masonry support are predominantly manufactured in stainless steel to prevent corrosion and failure. These are bespoke to the building's frame and engineered to take the loads required.

== See also ==
Ramsey, Charles (2000). Hoke, John Ray Jr. (ed.). Architectural Graphics Standards (10th ed.). John Wiley & Sons, Inc. ISBN 0-471-34816-3.
