= Masonry veneer =

External layer of masonry on a structure

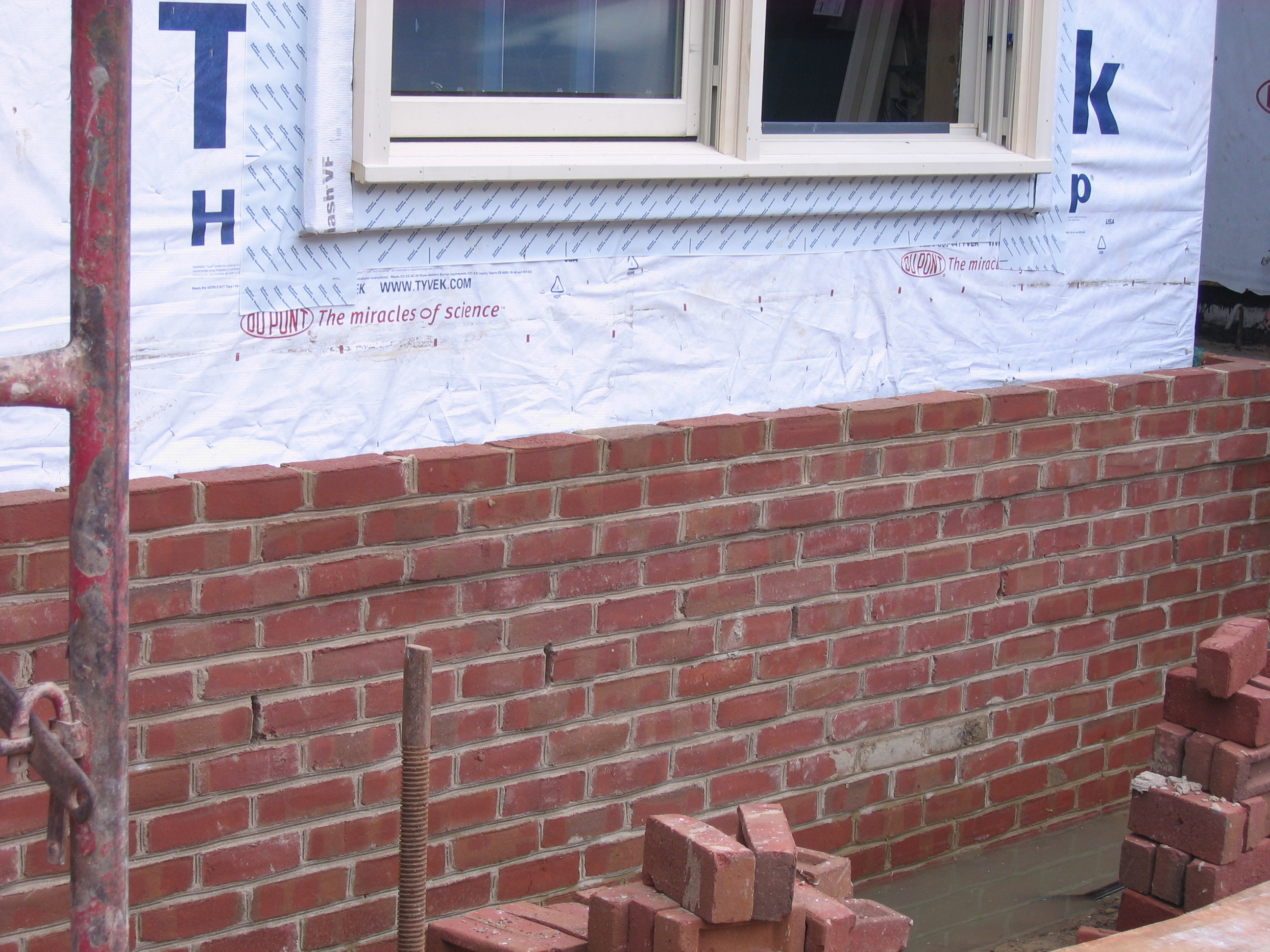
Brick veneer residential construction (US)

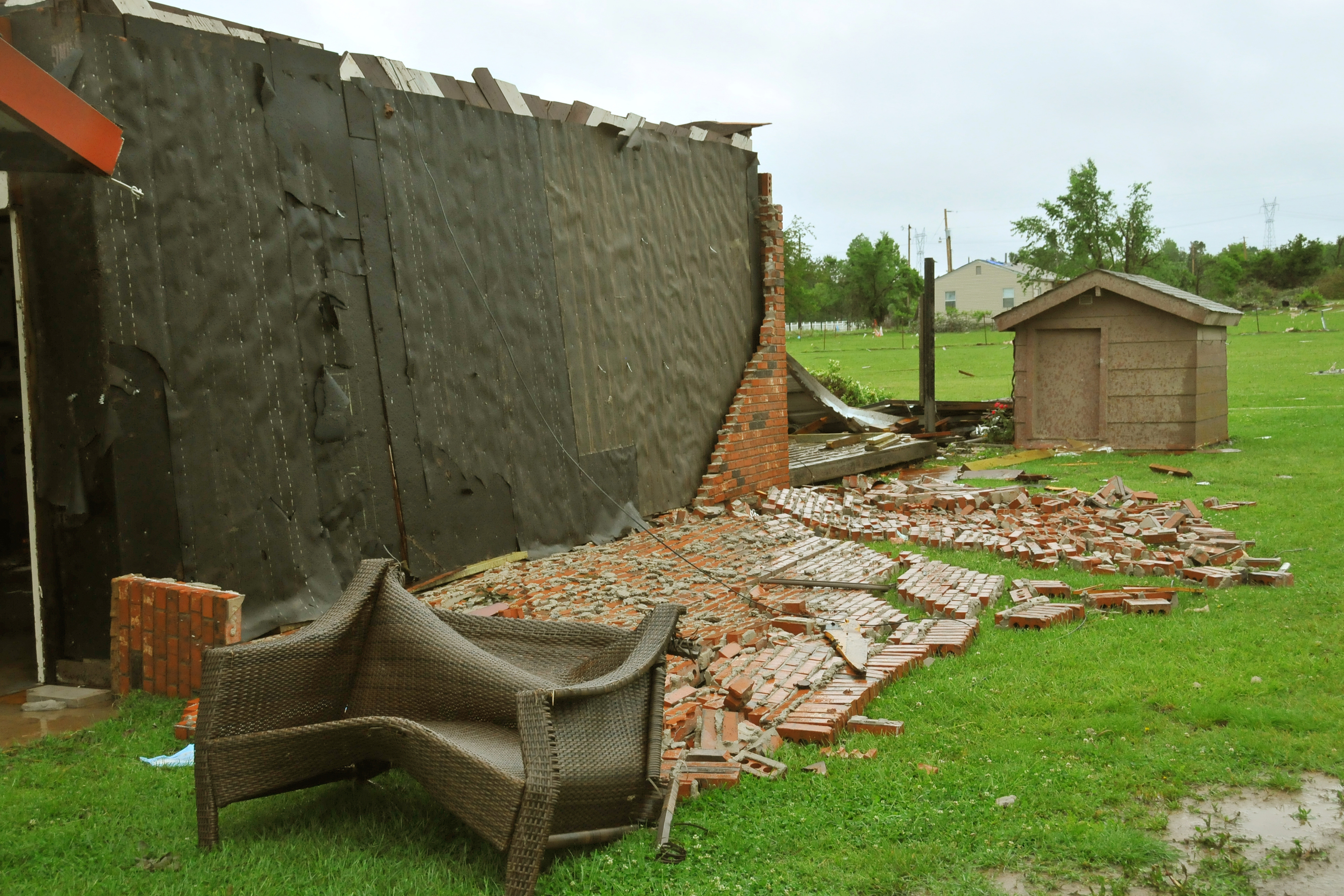
A brick veneer wall destroyed by a tornado

Masonry veneer walls consist of a single non-structural external layer of masonry, typically made of stone or artificial stone (a stone veneer) or of brick (a brick veneer). Masonry veneer can have an air space behind it and is technically called "anchored veneer". A masonry veneer attached directly to the backing is called "adhered veneer". The innermost element is structural, and may consist of masonry, concrete, timber or metal frame.

Because brick itself is not waterproof, the airspace also functions as a drainage plane, allowing any water that has penetrated the veneer to drain to the bottom of the air space, where it encounters flashing (weatherproofing) and is directed to the outside through weep holes, rather than entering the building.

Other advantages of a masonry veneer include:

- The air space can include additional insulation, which is typically in the form of rigid foam, increasing the thermal performance of the wall.
- The structural framing or masonry backup can be erected first to allow the rest of the building structure to be completed concurrently with the outer veneer, rather than waiting for the entire wall structure to be completed before proceeding with the roof and upper floors.
- A masonry veneer wall can be completed in a shorter time with less labor than a solid masonry wall thus saving in cost.
- The weight of a veneer wall can be significantly less than solid masonry, resulting in economies in foundations and structural support.
- Because they are a lighter-weight, more economical option, brick and stone masonry veneers can be used in place of natural stone or full brick to provide added aesthetic appeal to a structure.

== Support ==
Because the masonry veneer is non-structural, it must be tied back to the building structure to prevent movement under wind and earthquake loads. Brick ties are used for this purpose, and may take the form of corrugated metal straps nailed or screwed to the structural framing, or as wire extensions to horizontal joint reinforcement in a fully masonry veneer or cavity wall. Although the veneer is vertically self-supporting, shelf angles are often used in multi-story buildings, typically at floor edges, to provide a horizontal expansion joint that allows expansion of the brick and potential shrinkage of the frame. In multi-story buildings, such a system may be called a curtain wall. Adhered masonry veneer is bonded to the backing so it does not typically need a shelf angle.

== Materials ==
Masonry veneers can be made of brick, concrete, natural stone or manufactured stone product. Typically, masonry refers to individual units that are placed in a mortar bed, making a distinction with panelized products.

== Rainscreens ==
A variant on masonry veneer is the rainscreen veneer. Rainscreens are ventilated at the top and bottom of the cavity to prevent wind-driven rain from being driven into the building by unbalanced pressure. Such systems are typically encountered in areas where blowing rain is a significant concern.

== Thermal performance ==
Masonry has high thermal mass, so masonry is slower to heat up, and can continue to release heat long into the night; without insulation half of that heat will be released into the building. Masonry with a dark external surface absorbs more heat than with a lighter external surface, especially if exposed to sunlight. Reverse masonry veneer walls have the brickwork inside and the lightweight frame and cladding outside; this has the advantage of providing the thermal mass on the inside of a building.

Masonry itself provides very little insulation, however:

- a masonry veneer construction using one or more reflective foil surfaces next to a sufficiently thick cavity of still air can provide substantial insulation
- insulating material inserted between the framework studs can also provide substantial insulation.

Different configurations of such foil(s), air-space(s), and/or insulating material(s) can perform significantly better at excluding heat during summer and/or retaining heat during winter; these configurations often perform in counter-intuitive ways. Because of the enormous long-term potential for reducing energy requirements and improving occupant comfort, building designers should consult engineers or adopt configurations with known performances.

== See also ==
- Ashlar — solid and clad/veneered stone wall style
- Pebbledash — exterior decorative veneer
- Stone veneer
- Wythe, a section of masonry
