= Roughcast =

Coarse plaster surface used on exterior walls

Roughcast and pebbledash are durable coarse plaster surfaces used on outside walls. They consist of lime and sometimes cement mixed with sand, small gravel and often pebbles or shells. The materials are mixed into a slurry and are then thrown at the working surface with a trowel or scoop. The idea is to maintain an even spread, free from lumps, ridges or runs and without missing any background. Roughcasting incorporates the stones in the mix, whereas pebbledashing adds them on top.

== Architectures ==
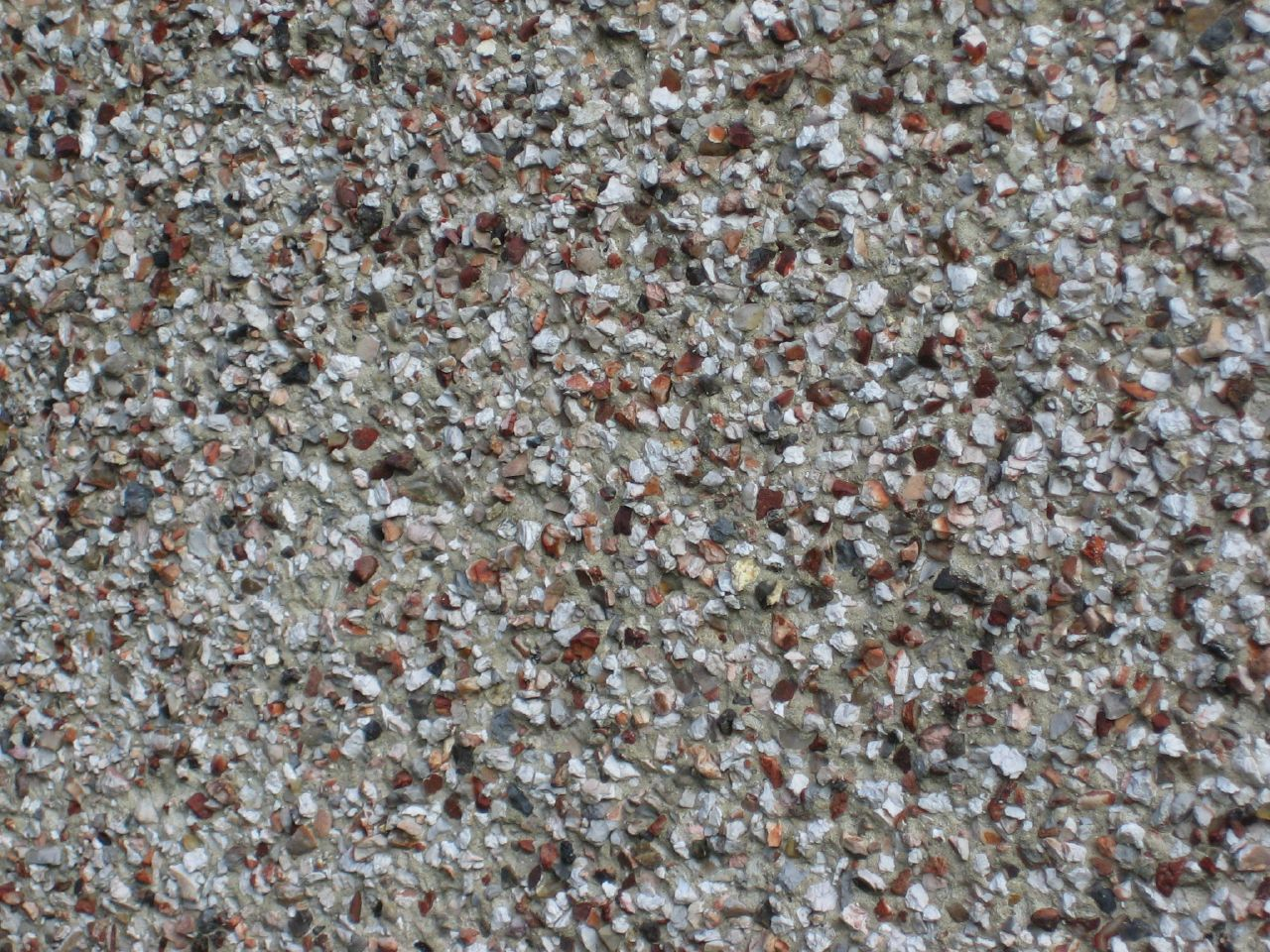
Close-up of pebbledash

According to the Encyclopædia Britannica Eleventh Edition (1910–1911), roughcast had been a widespread exterior coating given to the walls of common dwellings and outbuildings, but it was then frequently employed for decorative effect on country houses, especially those built using timber framing (half timber). Variety can be obtained on the surface of the wall by small pebbles of different colours, and in the Tudor period fragments of glass (frit) were sometimes embedded.

Though it is an occasional home-design fad, its general unpopularity in the UK as of 2006 was estimated to reduce the value of a property by up to 5%. However roughcasting remains very popular in Scotland and rural Ireland, with a high percentage of new houses being built with roughcasting.

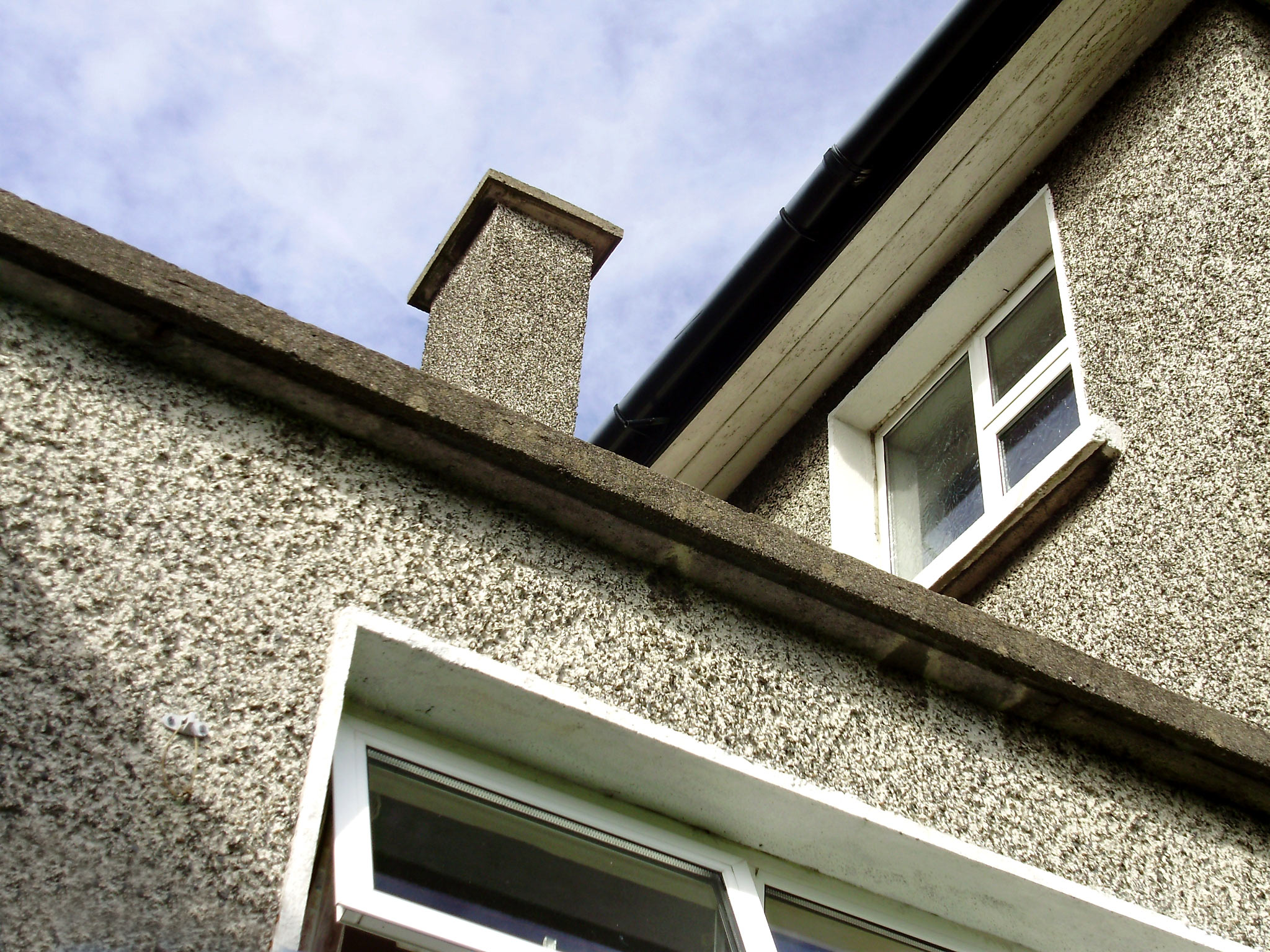
Pebbledashed walls on a building

This exterior wall finish was made popular in England and Wales during the 1920s, when housing was in greater demand, and house builders were forced to cut costs wherever they could, and used pebbledash to cover poor quality brick work, which also added rudimentary weather protection.

Pebbles were dredged from the seabed to provide the building material needed, although most modern pebbledash is actually not pebbles at all, but small and sharp flint chips, known as spar dash or spa dash.

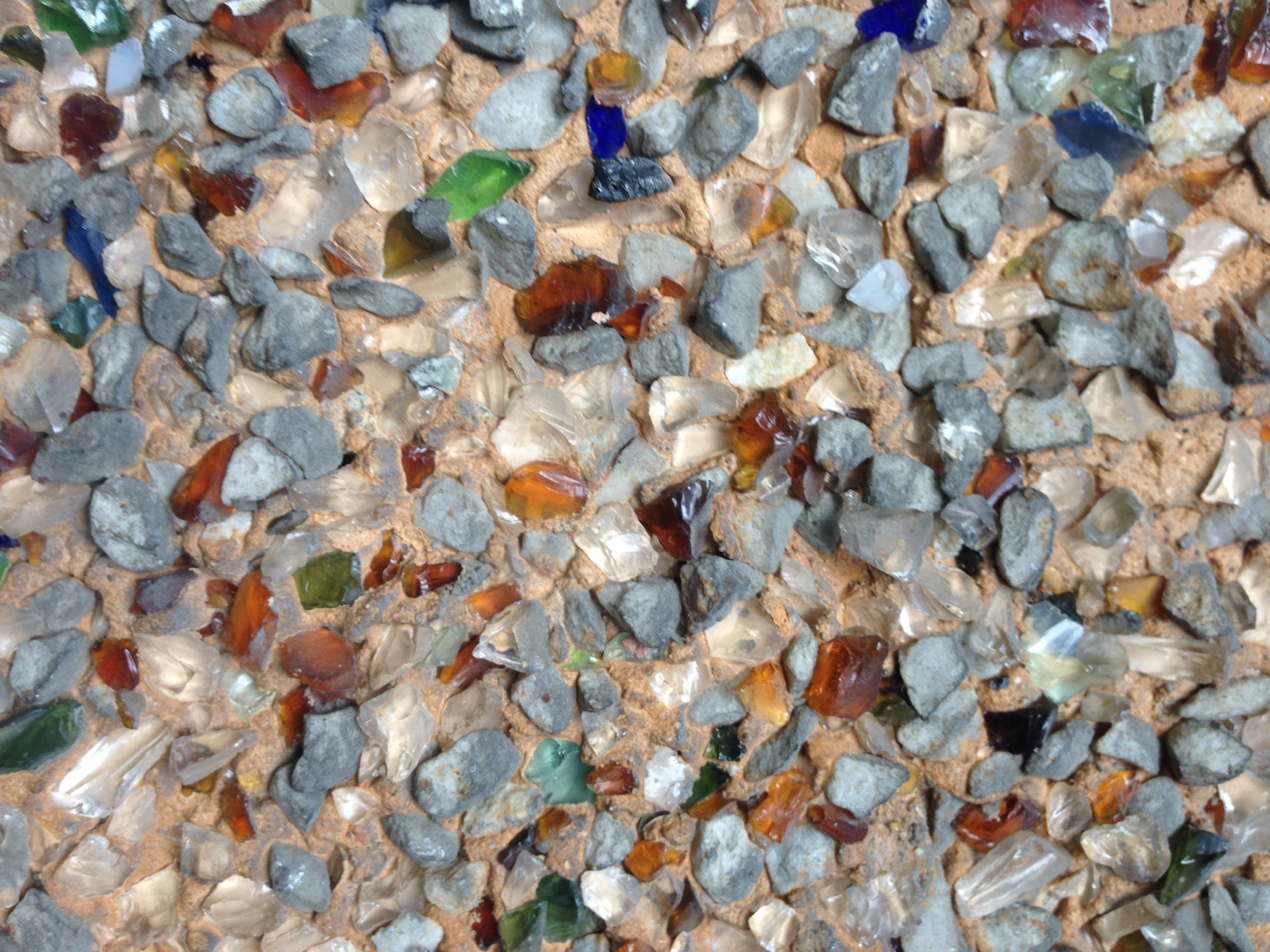
Rock dash stucco

There are several varieties of this spar dash such as Canterbury spar, sharp-dash, sharpstone dash, thrown dash, pebble stucco, Derbyshire Spar, yellow spar, golden gravel, black and white, and also sunflower.

According to the Encyclopædia Britannica Eleventh Edition, the central tower of St Albans Cathedral, built with Roman tiles from Verulamium, was covered with roughcast believed to be as old as the building. The roughcast was removed around 1870.

== See also ==
- Harl
- Plasterwork
- Stone cladding
