= Fiber cement siding =

Building material used to cover the exterior of a building

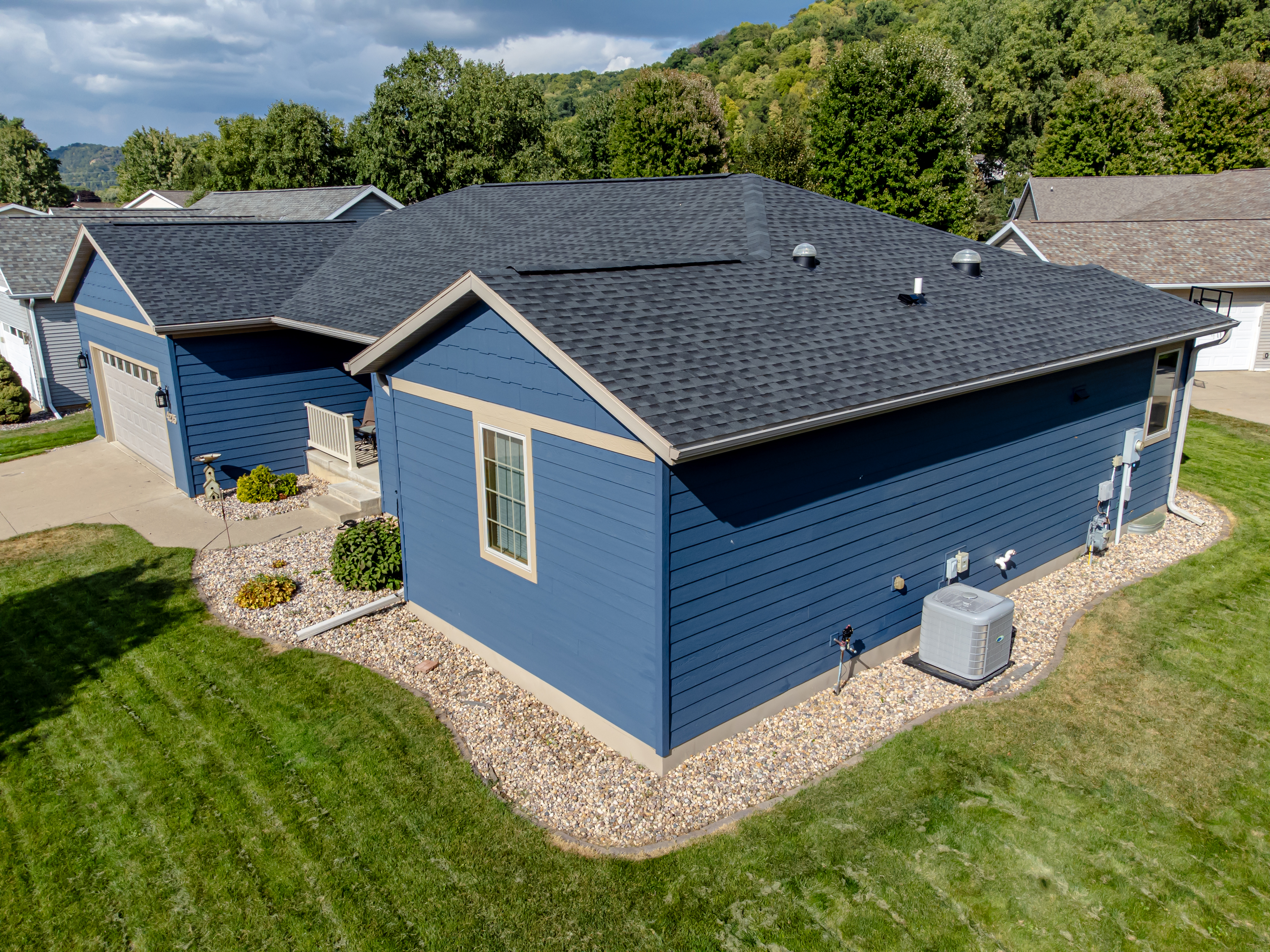
Fiber cement exterior residential siding

HardiePanel on design-build addition, Ithaca, New York

Fiber cement siding (also known as "fibre cement cladding" in the United Kingdom, "fibro" in Australia, and by the proprietary name "Hardie Plank" in the United States) is a building material used to cover the exterior of a building in both commercial and domestic applications. Fiber cement is a composite material made of cement reinforced with cellulose fibers. Originally, asbestos was used as the reinforcing material but, due to safety concerns, that was replaced by cellulose in the 1980s. Fiber cement board may come pre-painted or pre-stained or can be done so after its installation.

Fiber cement siding has several benefits since it is resistant to termites, does not rot, is impact resistant, and has fireproof properties.

== Specifications ==
Sheet sizes vary slightly from manufacturer to manufacturer but generally they range between 2400 and 3000 mm in length and between 900 and 1200 mm in width (600 & 450 mm increments). This manufactured size minimizes on-site wastage as residential floor, wall and roof structures lay structural members at 450 or 600mm centres.

When used as siding boards, widths between 130 mm and 300 mm (5.25 in and 12 in) are available. Fiber cement thicknesses vary between 4.5 and 18 mm and also vary in density – the lower density resulting in a fibrous rough edge when cut and the higher density having a cleaner smoother edge when cut.

Thermal resistance and sound transmission can vary greatly between fiber cement products. Fiber cement sheet products rate poorly in thermal resistance and sound transmission and separate wall insulation is highly recommended. Generally the thicker and denser the product the better resistance it will have to temperature and sound transmission.

== Installation ==
Detail - timber battens on fiber cement cladding, dwelling addition, Hardys Bay, NSW, Australia

Fiber cement cladding is a very heavy product and requires two people to carry the uncut sheets. Thin fiber cement cladding is fragile before installation and must be handled carefully because it is prone to chipping and breakage if improperly handled. Once the product is cut it may again require two people to install – one to hold the sheet flush against studwork and the other to nail the product in place.

Cutting fiber cement sheeting:

Sheeting can be cut to size in three ways.

- Thinner sheets can be scored with a heavy duty cutting blade and snapped
- Using a hand- or electric-powered "fibro cutter" (Australian term)
- A mechanical saw using a diamond blade (masonry blade) is needed to cut thicker and denser sheets

When hanging fiber cement sheets, an approximately 5-millimetre (0.2 in) gap is required between end-joints (cladding seams), later to be filled with caulking made for fiber cement siding. Metal 150 mm × 150 mm (6 in × 6 in) step flashing is required behind overlapping seams to prevent sheathing damage from water. Hot-dipped galvanized roofing nails are used to secure the sheets.

Some caution must be exercised to properly ventilate areas where fiber cement siding (FCS) is being cut; long-term exposure to the silica dust generated during the installation process can cause silicosis.

Fiber cement cladding can be painted or stained before or after installation. Once the product is fixed the joints are usually covered with timber battens and the entire wall surface is painted.

== History ==
Early fiber cement panels used asbestos fibers to add strength. Ludwig Hatschek patented asbestos-reinforced fiber cement in Austria in 1901 and named it "Eternit", based on the Latin term "aeternitas", meaning everlasting. In 1903, Schweizerische Eternit-Werke AG began fabricating the material in the city of Niederurnen in Switzerland. Cellulose-reinforced fiber cement products were introduced 1980s as a safe replacement for the very widely used asbestos cement products manufactured before that time.

== Durability ==
The external cladding products require very little maintenance once installed and painted. The thicker/denser fiber cement products have excellent impact resistance but the thinner less dense products need to be protected from impact. Compared to wooden siding, fiber cement is not susceptible to termites or rot.

Fiber cement siding using baseboard materials that have been classified, by accredited laboratories, as Category A according to BS EN 12467: 2004 Fiber-cement flat sheets - Product specification and test methods are sidings which are intended for applications where they may be subject to heat, high moisture and severe frost.

== Fire resistance ==
Fiber cement cladding is a non-combustible material which is widely used in high bushfire prone areas throughout Australia.

While the best possible reaction to Fire Classifications are A1 (construction applications) and A1Fl (flooring applications) respectively, both of which mean "non-combustible" according to European standard EN 13501-1: 2007, as classified by a notified laboratory in Europe, some fiber cement boards only come with Fire Classification of A2 (limited combustibility) or even lower classifications, if they are tested at all.

== Safety ==
A video describing the dust hazards created by cutting fiber cement siding and an inexpensive way to reduce dust exposure.

Long-term exposure to silica dust generated by cutting fiber cement siding during installation can lead to silicosis and other lung diseases among workers. Researchers at the US National Institute for Occupational Safety and Health (NIOSH) confirmed these findings, showing that many of the silica dust particles are in the respirable fraction, able to penetrate the deepest parts of the lung. Laboratory tests performed by cutting fiber cement siding within an isolated chamber showed that by connecting a regular shop vacuum to a circular saw, exposures to silica dust produced by the cutting can be reduced by 80-90%. Later, NIOSH completed four field surveys where construction workers cut fiber cement siding. Results showed that exposure to silica dust was controlled below the NIOSH Recommended Exposure Limit (REL) for respirable crystalline silica (0.05 mg/m3) when a regular shop vacuum was used.

== Alternatives ==
Competitors to fiber cement cladding include products made from vinyl, polyvinyl chloride, wood composite products (such as hardboard and Masonite) and aluminum siding.

== See also ==
- Cement board
- Eternit
- Asbestos cement
