= Stone veneer =

Thin sheets of stone applied as a decorative surface

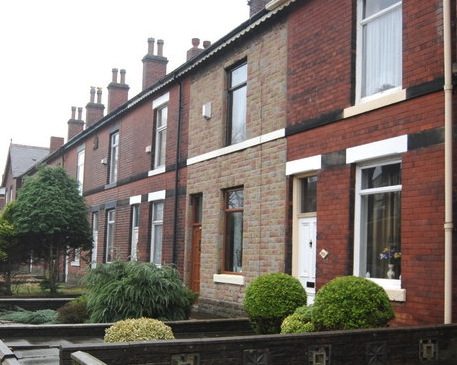
A row of Victorian, brick-built terraced houses in Bury, Greater Manchester, England (2008). One of the houses has been stone-clad.

Stone veneer is a type of masonry veneer constituted by a thin layer of any stone used as decorative facing material that is not meant to be load bearing. Stone cladding is a stone veneer, or simulated stone, applied to a building or other structure made of a material other than stone. Stone cladding is sometimes applied to concrete and steel buildings as part of their original architectural design.

== History ==
Thin stone veneer was first developed in the late 19th century, but there were materials developed much earlier that foreshadowed its use. For instance, the ancient Romans built large structures out of Roman concrete, and sometimes used a form of stone veneer to face them. Parts of the Roman Coliseum were originally faced with marble veneer; the holes which once held the anchors for the veneer are still visible.

Modern stone veneer first made its appearance in the late 1800s. The oldest of modern stone veneer product is now disintegrating. It was cut into thick portions and then hand tooled into the appropriate panels; the stones that were used were "granite, marble, travertine, limestone, and slate". Early in its development, thin stone veneer only had the capabilities to be utilized in areas such as the inside of buildings, street-level facades and storefronts.

In the late 19th and early 20th centuries non-load-bearing stone veneers were regularly affixed to load-bearing walls behind. As buildings began to grow taller with the advent of skeletal steel framing, it became necessary to diminish the thickness and weight of masonry walls in order to withstand the dead weight of the building. Without steel supports, load bearing walls could grow several meters thick on their lowest stories. A solution employed in the construction of early skyscrapers was the use of a steel structural frame that supported exterior stone walls at every floor, thereby distributing the load into the frame. This avoided a gradual buildup of weight that resulted in inconveniently thick lower walls. The Empire State Building uses this method, having two steel beams for attaching stone veneer on each floor; one inside to bear weight, and one acting as a shelf outside to support the building's limestone veneer. One and a half inches (38 mm) became the common thickness of stone veneer in the 1930s. The utilization of thin stone veneer for complete facades of buildings popped up in the 1940s. Stone veneer construction became much of what we see today in the 1950s. Transportation improved, so stone veneer was transported more efficiently and at lower costs than ever before. Methods to attach veneer to steel were developed; diamond-bladed tools became popular for developing thin stone veneer, while elastomeric sealant began to replace mortar techniques in the construction process. Thin stone veneer in the 1960s became more of a standardized look – in fact, standard education on stone veneer became available in The Marble Engineering Handbook and Marble-Faced Precast Panels, which were published by the Marble Institute of America and National Association of Marble Producers.

As stone veneer panels got thinner in the 1960s, the properties of the stone used became more important in order to compensate (as did safety considerations). Concrete as an aid to stone veneer continued to develop, as "in order to eliminate bowing, cracking, and staining of the veneer".

"Diamond-studded cables" were used to cut Italian marble into the necessary slabs as a part of an era of specialization in the 1970s. A 1976 patent shows that the stone material of composite stone veneer could be finished and developed in such a fashion that "it does not have the appearance of being a part of a composite stone veneered product."

Stone veneer was able to be cut to a thickness of 1/8 inch (3.2 mm) in the 1980s because of improvements in technology. The thickness of typical thin stone veneer was three centimeters by the early 2000s. Anchors of support were provided by a specific type of stainless steel or "of aluminum with a non-corroding material separator between the metal and stone". These anchors are attached to the back of the panels with a rod.

== Systems ==
There are a variety of systems for attaching stone veneers to facades including dowel, kerf, and undercut anchoring systems as well as direct fixing.

The direct or adhered fixing system relies on a mortar or cement bonding between the substrate wall and the backside of the stone veneer. This application is generally used indoors as exterior weathering and temperature extremes cause the veneer to crack and spall. The complete connection between the veneer and substrate does not account for differing rates of thermal expansion between materials, causing them to bind under pressure.

Most exterior veneer systems hang stone from a support wall by pins and anchors allowing air space between, essentially using stone as a rain screen. Anchorage systems are superior for exterior use because they permit any water that permeates the veneer to escape, while air space allows the materials of the supporting substrate wall to expand and contract at different rates to those of the veneer. The dowel anchorage system is one such method of hanging veneer. The system relies on holes drilled into the edges of stone panels in which metal dowels are inserted. The dowels are connected to an angle bracket that is in turn connected by anchor bolts to the building's load-bearing wall or steel frame. Kerf anchorage systems operate in much the same way with different metal hardware. The kerf system uses grooves cut into the edges of stone veneer panels in which kerf plates or cleats are inserted, those plates are mounted to the wall behind and act much like a shelf on which the stone panel rests. Both the dowel and Kerf anchorage systems can be attached to the top, bottom and sides of each panel ensuring a secure hold and binding the panels together to make a complete veneer.

A fourth and somewhat less common anchoring system is the Undercut anchoring system which uses an expansion ring on the end of a bolt to lock into an undercut hole in the back of a veneer panel. Pressure from tightening the bolt causes the expansion ring to flare out, filling the undercut hole. The bolt is then affixed to anchorage system connected to the supporting wall behind.

== Materials ==
Stone veneer can be made from natural stone as well as manufactured stone. Natural stone veneer is made from real stone that is either collected, i.e. fieldstone, or quarried. The stone is cut to a consistent thickness and weight for use as a veneer.

== Manufactured products ==
Manufactured stone veneer is fabricated by pouring a lightweight concrete mix into rubber forms and painted with a coloring process which makes it resemble real stone. The stone veneer produced is then attached to walls with special mortars.

Flexible stone veneer is fabricated by pulling a thin layer of stone from a slab of slate, sandstone, or mica schist. It is backed by a composite material.

== Cladding ==
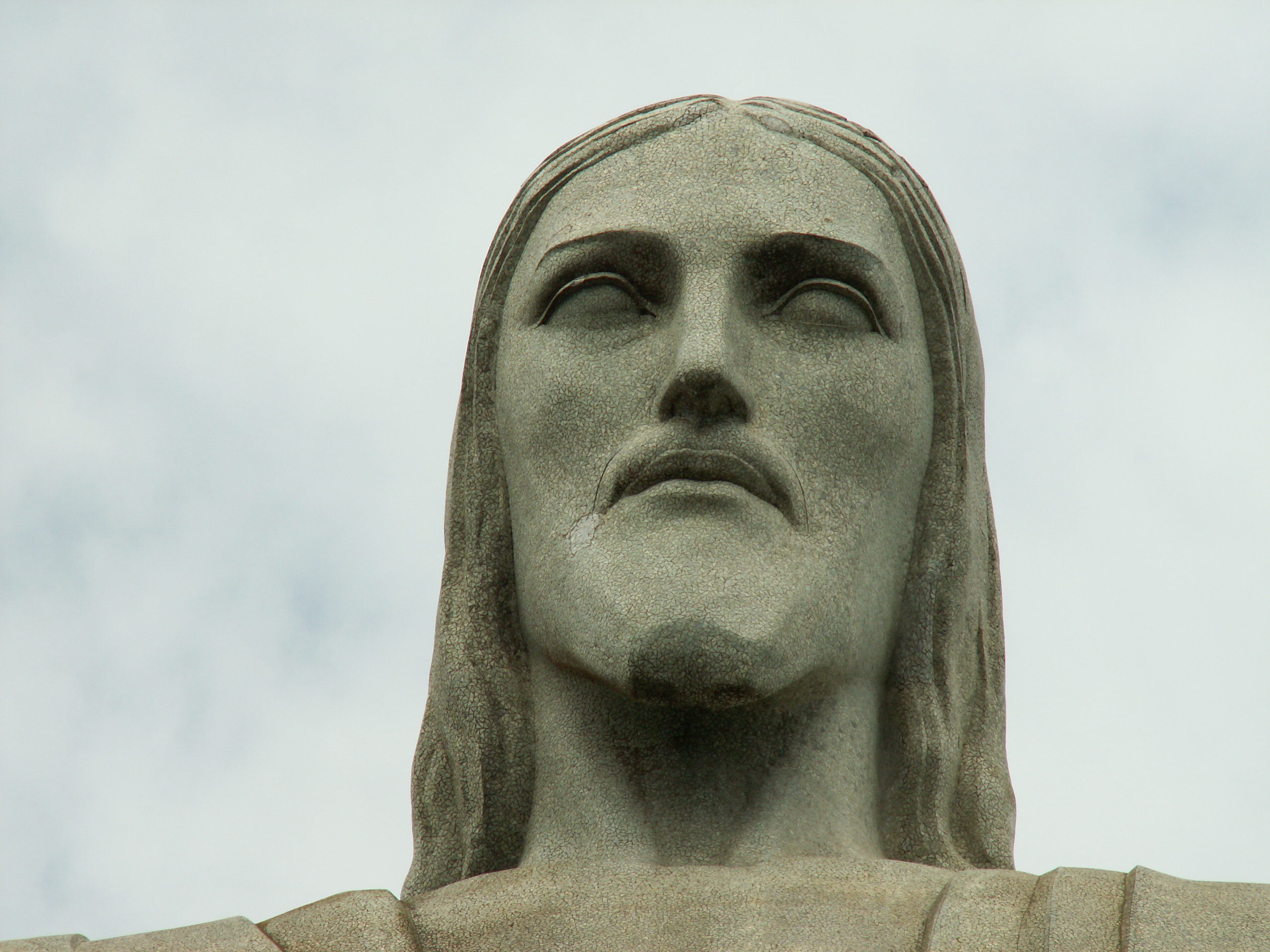
Close-up of the face of Christ the Redeemer in Rio de Janeiro, Brazil. It is made of reinforced concrete clad in a mosaic of thousands of triangular soapstone tiles.

Stone cladding often consists of a lightweight simulated stone products with a concrete-type base. These stone cladding products are often fitted to lightweight substrates to reduce the material cost of construction; this would typically comprise

- timber stud frame
- waterproof barrier
- fibre cement sheet
- expanded metal mesh
- mortar scratch coat.

Then, using a mortar mix, the stone cladding would be affixed to the wall. In the US, a typical installation on a lightweight substrate would use plywood backing as an alternative to fibre cement sheet.

Alternatively, stone cladding can be a natural stone that has been quarried and then cut into thin pieces to reduce weight.

Being heavier, natural stone cladding often needs mechanical fixing to be adhered to substrates. Mechanical fixing could be using shelf angles, or perhaps a product called stone clip.

Several methods or systems are available for installing stone on the exterior of buildings.

== See also ==
- Ashlar – solid and clad/veneered stone wall style
- Masonry veneer
- Pebbledash – exterior decorative veneer
- Wythe, a section of masonry
