= Leaky condo crisis =

Widespread leakage into Canadian residential buildings due to poor waterproofing

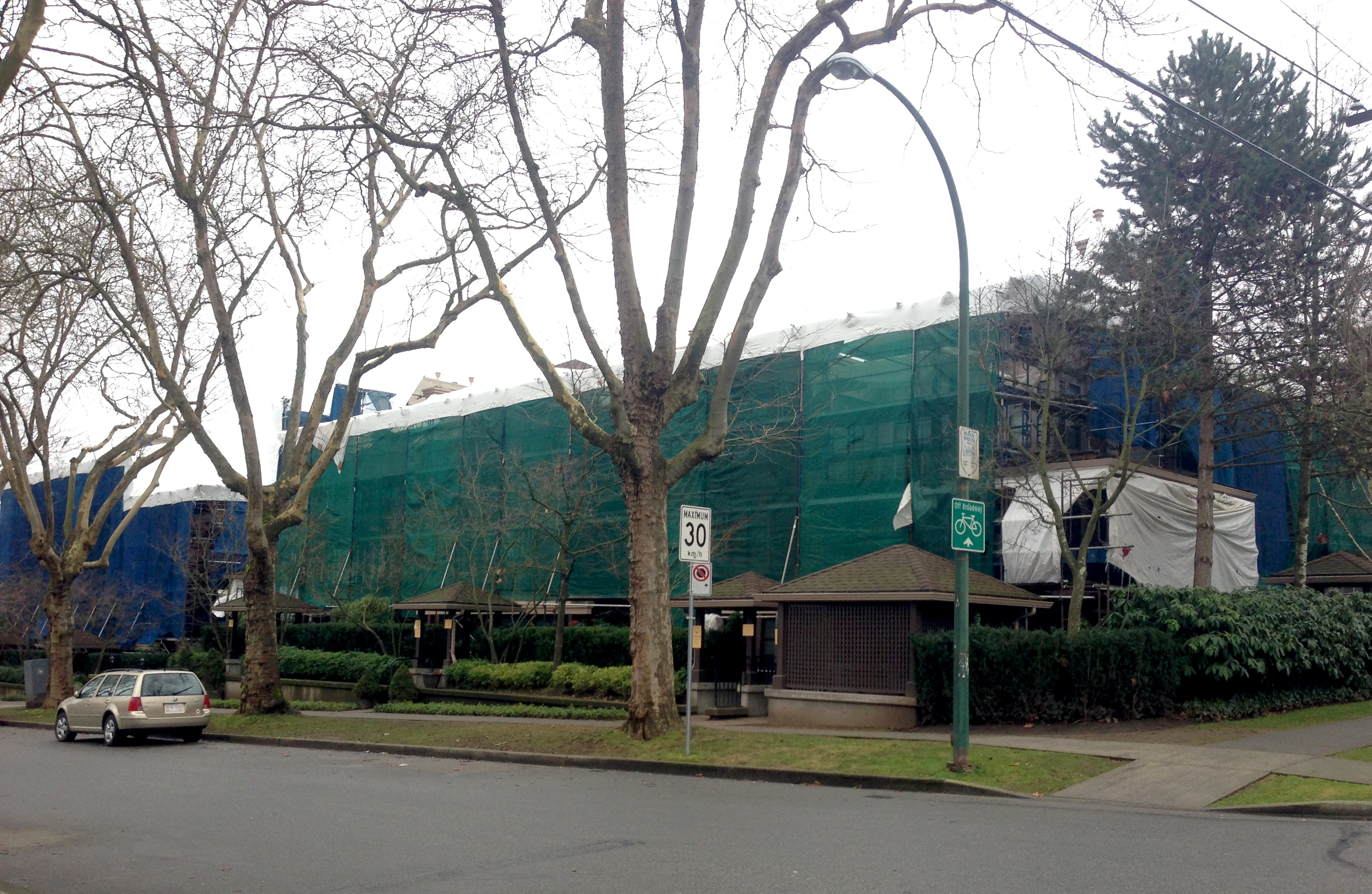
Low-rise residential building undergoing repairs to correct apparent "leaky condo syndrome" in Vancouver's West Point Grey neighborhood, 2014.

The leaky condo crisis, also known as the leaky condo syndrome and rotten condo crisis, is an ongoing construction, financial, and legal crisis in Canada. It primarily involves multi-unit condominium (or strata) buildings damaged by rainwater infiltration in the Lower Mainland and Vancouver Island regions of coastal British Columbia (B.C.). In B.C. alone an estimated $4 billion in damage has occurred to over 900 buildings and 31,000 individual housing units built between the late 1980s and early 2000s, establishing it as the most extensive and most costly reconstruction of housing stock in Canadian history.

Similar infiltration problems have been reported in highrise buildings and schools, as well as in other climatic zones in Ontario and Nova Scotia, in the United States, and New Zealand. Since the start of the crisis it has been commonplace to see occupied buildings draped in scaffolding and protective tarps as the problems were assessed and repaired. The crisis has caused, as a major public inquiry concluded: "a litany of horrific experiences, personal tragedies, and dashed dreams" endured by homeowners.

== Problem ==
The main physical problem is water infiltrating the exterior building envelope (walls and roofs) of buildings, usually through a water-resistant barrier (e.g. building paper, or housewrap) that is designed to prevent water drops from passing through, but allow water vapour through. However, problems in design, installation, and damage during construction can allow water that inevitably penetrates walls to not drain and/or dry. This causes rot and delamination of exterior wall cladding and sheathing, rusting in metal wall studs, rot in the wood structure, saturation of batt insulation, and development of mould and spores inside the walls and building interior. The construction failures ranged from minor to major failure of the structural integrity of the building. Some buildings became unhealthy to occupants. Most of these buildings are low-rise, 3–4 story buildings constructed of wood-frame construction, as well as some with steel, concrete, and metal stud construction types, including highrises.

The majority of the buildings that have experienced these problems in British Columbia are condominium buildings, although commercial properties and public schools have also been affected. Many homeowners have been faced with correcting a problem they did not create, by a contractor they had not hired; they purchased the units either from a previous owner, a developer, or a developer/contractor. Typical repair costs are in the tens or even hundreds of thousands of dollars, resulting in significant hardship, bankruptcies, and lawsuits against the developers, contractors, architects, and others involved in the original construction and maintenance of the buildings.

In total, approximately 45% of the 159,979 condominium strata units and 57% of the 700 school buildings constructed in B.C. between 1985 and 2000 were found to have envelope leak problems. It was reported in 2002 that 90% of 3–4 story units built have serious problems and that some have undergone envelope repairs two and three times. In 2008 it was estimated the cost to repair the damage to schools alone would be nearly $400 million.

== Contributing factors ==
There were several factors that brought about the crisis. Beginning in the 1980s, the Greater Vancouver area of B.C.'s Lower Mainland, and to a lesser degree the Greater Victoria region on Vancouver Island, experienced a construction boom in the multi-family condominium market. This attracted developers, design aesthetics, designers, contractors, workers, and new building technologies from climates that were quite different than the coastal region of B.C. which supports large areas of temperate rain forests.

A 1998 provincial commission of inquiry summarized the key factors:
"The evidence suggests that significant building envelope failures in British Columbia since the early 1980s ... is a result of numerous factors, including design features inappropriate for our climate; a reliance on face-sealed wall systems; a fundamental lack of awareness regarding the principles of enclosure design suitable for our climate; meaningful inspection at critical stages of construction; and a regulatory system which was unable to understand that failures were occurring and to redress them."

=== Climate ===
The Lower Mainland and southern Vancouver Island regions have a moderate oceanic climate that each year experiences months-long periods of cool, damp, overcast, and rainy weather. Greater Vancouver receives over 161 rainy days per year and rainfall between 1,153 and 2,477 millimetres (45.4–97.5 in) per year, approximately double that of London, England; triple that of Rome, Italy; and more than quadruple that of Los Angeles. With an average high summer temperature of 21–22 °C (70–72 °F), buildings dry out much less quickly (or not at all) compared to those in southern California or Mediterranean climates where average high summer temperatures reach 28–30 °C (82–86 °F). Building design in coastal British Columbia had provided greater protection from the damp and rainy climate than newer designs until this time, through the use of features such as overhanging roofs which protect the walls below from direct rain contact.

=== Design ===
A major design aesthetic of the 1980s and 1990s was Post Modernism, which featured building styles and forms reminiscent of the Mediterranean and southern California. This design approach was heavily marketed and became a fashionable design motif. Common building elements of this time included roof parapets with no overhangs or eaves, stucco wall cladding, open walkways, arched windows, and complex cladding joints, all of which provided more opportunities for water penetration and acted, as several studies would confirm, as key contributors to water infiltration.

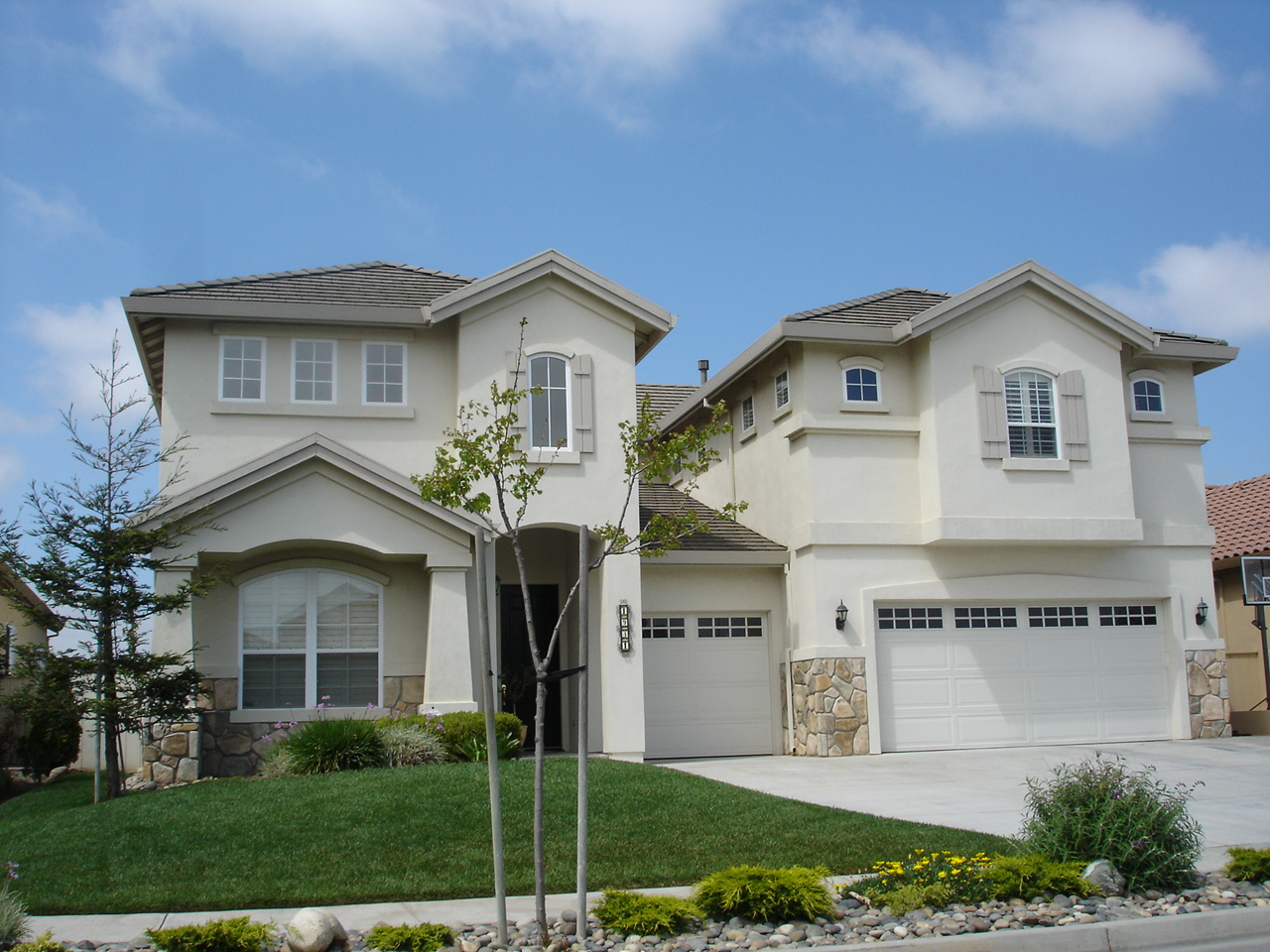
Suburban house showing 1980–90s post-modern design and materials

=== Regulatory codes ===
The City of Vancouver, the largest city in British Columbia, had also changed its Zoning By-Law to include roof overhangs in the amount of permitted (buildable and salable) floor area, known as floor space ratio or FSR. Roof overhangs were included in the calculation of FSR, and because this reduced the amount of permitted floor space, they were often removed from designs. The disappearance of roof overhangs resulted in walls being exposed directly to rainfall.

The calculation of FSR from the outside of the building envelope, instead of from the centre or interior side of the wall, also tended to promote thinner walls and rainscreen systems. Open, uncovered walkways were excluded from the FSR, thus encouraging their inclusion in the design.

Prior to 1993 in B.C., architects and engineers were not required to certify that the design met the requirements of the building codes, review the quality of construction, or certify that the construction had been performed in accordance with the codes, permitted drawings, and specifications, including those relating to providing a weathertight building envelope.

Design professionals were not required to perform these extensive reviews during construction, and developers not wishing to incur extra fees would not engage them to do so. This left the obligation for correct interpretation and construction to the developers or builders, who either lacked the experience and/or had a financial incentive to cut costs. The Provincial and Vancouver Building Codes were amended in 1993 to require, as a condition of the building permit and the occupancy permit, that design professionals be engaged to perform this level of certification and oversight. However, application of this provision of the codes was frequently not enforced in many condominium projects; they were issued Building Permits under another section of the code that did not require Letters of Assurance.

The National Building Code of Canada, upon which the British Columbia Building Code, and the Vancouver Building By-Law are based, had since the 1970s and early 1980s been progressively introducing changes to require greater sealing of exterior walls to prevent infiltration of moisture vapor from the interior of the building. In most Canadian winter climates, which are cold and dry, such vapor infiltrating into exterior wall insulation causes condensation and significantly reduced insulation performance, hence increased energy consumption. Although increased sealing can save energy, such sealing can prevent the walls from "breathing" and drying out during the warmer months.

=== Design professionals ===
Development pressures and lack of effective legal prevention of fee competition amongst design professionals contributed to significantly reduced professional fees paid to architects and engineers. In some cases less attention was therefore paid to careful detailing of the construction drawings, noticeably in envelope details for flashing and sealing of joints and edge conditions at windows and doors. The previously normal practice of the architects monitoring of the construction trades on a building project was reduced or eliminated.

=== Contractors ===
In many projects, developers and contractors established separate companies for each project. At the end of construction, the developer and/or contractor would be dissolved, thereby removing any legal recourse by those wishing to make a financial claim for defects in construction. These practices, while considered unethical "shell games", were not illegal.

The building boom also attracted new and inexperienced workers unfamiliar with the construction trades in general and local practices in particular. Since the early 1980s, the majority of construction work has been performed by unskilled labour. Concern was voiced by representatives of industry and labour about reduced training and government financial support for trades, training systems, and apprenticeship programs.

=== Building materials ===
A major contributing factor to the crisis was the increase in the use of cladding systems such as acrylic stucco and exterior insulation finishing system (or EIFS), which are highly resistant to infiltration and exfiltration of water and moisture. Unlike more traditional materials, such as wood siding or cement-based stucco, a critical flaw of the new materials is that any water or moisture that penetrates into the system, either through cracks in the surface (caused by thermal expansion or damage), unsealed joints, or incorrect flashings, becomes trapped inside the wall, potentially causing deterioration, rot, and mold.

Another newer building material that contributed to the damage was the widespread use of oriented strand board (OSB) as sheathing under the exterior siding or cladding. It did not cause water infiltration, but it is much more susceptible to deterioration from water and is less able to breathe than are plywood or boards, the standard sheathing material for the previous decades.

== Investigation ==
To date, four major investigative initiatives on the Leaky Condo Crisis have been undertaken: two by the Canada Mortgage and Housing Corporation (CMHC); and two by former B.C. provincial premier Dave Barrett, who was appointed by the province of B.C. to conduct two separate inquiries. The commissions' findings have been accepted as accurate and fair by many sectors of the related professions and the construction industry. To date they are the most extensive investigations and reports prepared on the issue. A private sector group was also established to facilitate discussion and building envelope research.

=== Building Envelope Research Consortium (BERC) ===
In 1995 the BERC was established through an initiative of CMHC to act as a coordinating agency for the research of building envelope problems in B.C.. Participants included agencies of the federal, provincial, and municipal agencies; professional associations; University of British Columbia schools of architecture civil engineering, British Columbia Institute of Technology; a private sector research company; development and construction industry associations; trades unions; contractors and materials suppliers and associations; and financing and insurance agencies. (In 2003 BERC merged with the B.C. Building Envelope Council (BCBEC) and was renamed the Building Research Committee (BRC)).

=== CMHC investigation 1996 ===
In 1996 the Canada Mortgage and Housing Corporation released its Survey of Building Envelope Failures in the Coastal Climate of British Columbia. It undertook a study of 37 "problem" buildings which were defined as those in which a moisture problem within the walls, decks or exterior framing had resulted in damage requiring $10,000 or more to repair and incorporated a variety of materials in exterior wall components. Nine "control" buildings were also studied, those being defined as buildings which had not experienced moisture problems for at least five years. The recommendations, several of which would be echoed in later reports, included greater clarity in design strategies, improvement in details, envelope quality management protocol, training of trades in building envelope construction, use of rainscreen systems, and guidance for maintaining exterior wall systems.

=== Barrett Commission 1998 ===
In April 1998 a Commission of Inquiry into the quality of condominium construction in the Province of British Columbia (commonly referred to as the Barrett Commission after Commission Chair Dave Barrett) was established. The commission's mandate was to inquire into then decade-old crisis of leaking condominiums. The Commission held public hearings from April 28 to May 20, 1998, which included presentations from condominium owners and representatives from different sectors of the residential construction industry and over 700 written submissions. The report was issued June 16, 1998.

In total 82 specific recommendations were made, including changes to zoning regulations, building codes, provincial law, federal law, financing, contractor licensing, and requirements of design professionals; and establishment of a Compensation Fund for reconstruction and a provincial Homeowner Protection Office.

=== Barrett Commission 1999-2000 ===
In 1999 a (second) Commission of Inquiry into the Quality of Condominium Construction part II was established following collapse of the construction industry-run and financed New Home Warranty of British Columbia Inc. (NHWBC), the largest provider of new-home warranty coverage in B.C.. The commission had a mandate to:

- determine the harm caused by the collapse of NHWBC to individual condo owners and the resulting financial and economic impact on B.C. consumers, the housing market and the economy;
- review existing financial support programs for B.C. homeowners to see if they are adequate and if changes should be made;
- examine the role of Canada Mortgage and Housing Corporation’s programs in mortgage loan insurance and their relationship to financial institutions.

The commission's findings were published in two volumes in January and March 2000. Among its recommendations was 100% compensation up to $25,000 per unit for repairs, with costs to be shared equally between the provincial and federal governments and the B.C. condominium construction industry.

== Aftermath ==
In the aftermath of the major revelations of the crisis, both before and after the Barrett Commissions' reports, the B.C. provincial government and Lower Mainland municipalities responded in a variety of ways.

=== Homeowner protection ===
At the height of the crisis in April 1999 the New Home Warranty of British Columbia & Yukon, the main source of warrantees against construction defects for BC home buyers, collapsed. It was a voluntary warranty program created by the provincial residential construction industry in 1975. NHW had a monopoly in B.C. until National Home Warranty of Alberta entered the B.C. market in the late 1990s. Neither program was subject to provincial regulations beyond the Corporations Act. In 1998 approximately 60% of all new housing units were carrying warranty protection.

In 1998 B.C. implemented the Homeowner Protection Act. It was designed to protect homebuyers from and improve the quality of residential construction and established the Homeowner Protection Office (HPO), a provincial Crown corporation responsible for:

- licensing builders and monitoring the provision of compulsory third party home warranty insurance which includes five year insurance against water penetration.
- mandatory registration of residential contractors with an approved warranty insurance provider
- administering a no-interest repair loan programme available to some owners of leaky homes
- operating a research and education program

By 2000 the HPO was involved with approximately 500 condominium buildings containing nearly 32,000 residential units.

In 2010, the HPO merged with BC Housing. HPO later became known by its current name: Licensing and Consumer Services. Under the Homeowner Protection Act, a new home warranty is mandatory. Every new home has a warranty for a period of 1 year for fit and finish, 2 years for mechanical components, 5 years for building envelope, and 10 years for structural components.

=== Building Codes & By-Laws ===
The City of Vancouver and other B.C. municipalities began to implement their own prescriptive requirements for building envelope design and construction in multi-unit residential buildings, even before the Barrett Commission's 1998 report was issued and the provincial government amended the B.C. Building Code. The two most significant items were requirements for rainscreen construction of exterior walls and professional certification of the design and implementation of the design in the construction.

==== Rainscreen construction ====
A rainscreen is the weather-facing surface of an exterior wall that stands off from the moisture-resistant surface of the main wall. There is a gap or cavity between the outermost layer, or rainscreen, and the main wall which prevents infiltration of moisture into the main wall assembly and allows air to circulate between. By 1997 Vancouver and neighboring Richmond and New Westminster enacted requirements for this construction technology in residential construction. (Masonry veneer walls typically have a similar type cavity but these are not limited to residential buildings). The Vancouver Building By-Law included this requirement in its 1996 edition and the BC Building Code in 2006 for coastal climates. A 5-year scientific study on residential building envelopes in Vancouver was undertaken between 2001 and 2006. Its conclusions reported on the benefits of rainscreens in exterior wall assemblies.

==== Building Envelope Professionals ====
One of the key recommendations of the Barrett Commission was to require that "Any architect or engineer involved in Letters of Assurance and the field review process must have the qualifications, or sub-contract the building envelope design and review to a qualified Building Envelope Specialist".

In 1995 (before the Barrett Commission), the City of Vancouver established a list of "Building Envelope Specialists" (BES), comprising architectural and engineering firms deemed qualified to provide independent inspection and review of building envelope components, based on the city's perception of the firm's qualifications and experience in the Lower Mainland. These professionals were required to be retained by the owner/developer to provide the Letters of Assurance. Other municipalities in the region soon followed Vancouver's lead. It was recognized that the city's BES list was a temporary measure until a more permanent process was established.

In 1997 the Architectural Institute of British Columbia (AIBC) launched its own specialty course Building Envelope Education Program for its members.

In 1999 a joint committee of the professional governing bodies for architects and engineers in the province (the AIBC and the Association of Professional Engineers and Geoscientists of British Columbia) developed a formal designation: the Building Envelope Professional (BEP). A joint accreditation process and procedures manual for BEPs was created and the municipalities' lists of BES were discarded as they transferred recognition to the BEP list.

=== Financial assistance ===
In 1998 the B.C. government initiated an interest-free loan program to assist homeowners with building envelope repairs. It was administered through the Homeowner Protection Office and approved more than $670 million in loans from during its decade of operation. The loans were financed through a levy on new residential projects and in 2009 Rich Coleman, the minister responsible for housing at the time, stated the program was no longer raising sufficient funds during the economic downturn to continue the program. In 1999 the B.C. government announced a provincial grant and tax relief program to assist homeowners affected by the crisis.

=== Political effects ===
The enormity of the crisis has been felt at all levels of government. Locally, the large tarps over buildings being repaired came to be known as "B.C. flags". In 1999 B.C. Premier Glen Clark called on the federal government to offer tax relief on repairs. In 2005 and 2006 the Prime Minister of Canada made a commitment to provide financial aid to homeowners affected by the crisis. To date no financial assistance has been provided by the federal government. Former federal cabinet minister Simma Holt waged a publicly vocal seven-year legal action in the 2000s seeking compensation for repairs for her own leaking condominium.

=== "Smoking gun" and lawsuit ===
In 2005, Member of Parliament John Cummins alleged that the federal government was complicit, and attempted to cover up its complicity, in creating the crisis through the National Energy Program's energy conservation measures. On August 27, 1981, then CMHC president Ray Hession had written to the committee responsible for the National Building Code, warning of the "emergency" matter of moisture damage that is "potentially serious, possibly widespread and ... concerns matters of structural safety and public health." Hession wrote in a September 1981 letter to federal Deputy Minister of Energy, Mines, and Resources M.A. (Mickey) Cohen: "Nevertheless, I feel it equally important for us to collectively face up to the reality that construction practices associated with energy conservation measures do, in fact, increase the hazard of moisture-induced structural damage."

In 2005, a class action lawsuit was filed in B.C. Supreme Court against the CMHC (a Crown corporation), seeking damages. (In 2007, the court refused to certify the suit.) In July 2006, federal Human Resources Minister Diane Finley wrote that the government couldn't even "consider" a review while the government was being sued by some owners.

== See also ==
- New Zealand's leaky homes crisis
- Architecture of Vancouver
- Canadian property bubble
- Surfside condominium collapse
