= Building science =

Scientific study of buildings

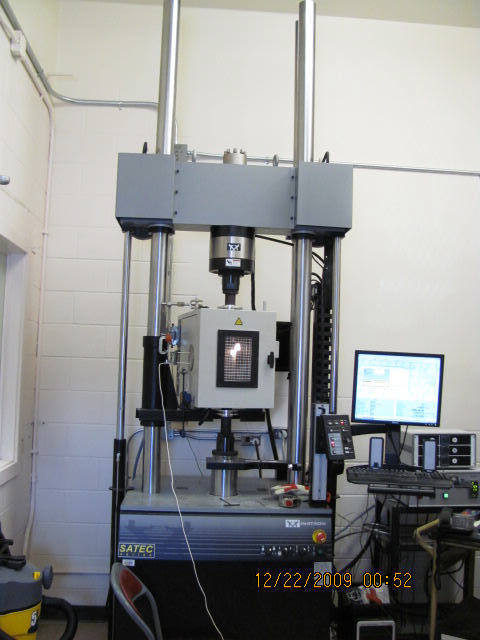
Small furnace capable of 600°C and of applying a static load for testing building materials

Building science is the science and technology-driven collection of knowledge to provide better indoor environmental quality (IEQ), energy-efficient built environments, and occupant comfort and satisfaction. Building physics, architectural science, and applied physics are terms used for the knowledge domain that overlaps with building science. In building science, the methods used in natural and hard sciences are widely applied, which may include controlled and quasi-experiments, randomized control, physical measurements, remote sensing, and simulations. On the other hand, methods from social and soft sciences, such as case study, interviews & focus group, observational method, surveys, and experience sampling, are also widely used in building science to understand occupant satisfaction, comfort, and experiences by acquiring qualitative data. One of the recent trends in building science is a combination of the two different methods. For instance, it is widely known that occupants' thermal sensation and comfort may vary depending on their sex, age, emotion, experiences, etc. even in the same indoor environment. Despite the advancement in data extraction and collection technology in building science, objective measurements alone can hardly represent occupants' state of mind such as comfort and preference. Therefore, researchers are trying to measure both physical contexts and understand human responses to figure out complex interrelationships.

Building science traditionally includes the study of indoor thermal environment, indoor acoustic environment, indoor light environment, indoor air quality, durability, moisture damage, and building resource use, including energy and building material use. These areas are studied in terms of physical principles, relationship to building occupant health, comfort, and productivity, and how they can be controlled by the building envelope and electrical and mechanical systems. The National Institute of Building Sciences (NIBS) additionally includes the areas of building information modeling, building commissioning, fire protection engineering, seismic design and resilient design within its scope.

One of the applications of building science is to provide predictive capability to optimize the building performance and sustainability of new and existing buildings, understand or prevent building failures, and guide the design of new techniques and technologies.

== Applications ==
During the architectural design process, building science knowledge is used to inform design decisions to optimize building performance. Design decisions can be made based on knowledge of building science principles and established guidelines, such as the NIBS Whole Building Design Guide (WBDG) and the collection of ASHRAE Standards related to building science.

Computational tools can be used during design to simulate building performance based on input information about the designed building envelope, lighting system, and mechanical system. Models can be used to predict operational energy use, solar heat and radiation distribution, air flow, and other physical phenomena within the building. These tools are valuable for evaluating a design and ensuring it will perform within an acceptable range before construction begins. Many of the available computational tools analyze building performance goals and perform design optimization. The accuracy of the models is influenced by the modeler's knowledge of building science principles and by the amount of validation performed for the specific program.

When existing buildings are being evaluated, measurements and computational tools can be used to evaluate performance based on measured existing conditions. An array of in-field testing equipment can be used to measure temperature, moisture, sound levels, air pollutants, or other criteria. Standardized procedures for taking these measurements are provided in the Performance Measurement Protocols for Commercial Buildings. For example, thermal infrared (IR) imaging devices can be used to measure temperatures of building components while the building is in use. These measurements can be used to evaluate how the mechanical system is operating and if there are areas of anomalous heat gain or heat loss through the building envelope.

Measurements of conditions in existing buildings are used as part of post occupancy evaluations. Post occupancy evaluations may also include surveys of building occupants to gather data on occupant satisfaction and well-being and to gather qualitative data on building performance that may not have been captured by measurement devices.

Many aspects of building science are the responsibility of the architect (in Canada, many architectural firms employ an architectural technologist for this purpose), often in collaboration with the engineering disciplines that have evolved to handle 'non-building envelope' building science concerns: Civil engineering, Structural engineering, Earthquake engineering, Geotechnical engineering, Mechanical engineering, Electrical engineering, Acoustic engineering, & fire code engineering. Even the interior designer will inevitably generate a few building science issues.

== Topics ==
=== Daylighting and visual comfort ===
Daylighting is the controlled admission of natural light, direct sunlight, and diffused skylight into a building to reduce electric lighting and save energy. A daylighting system does not just consist of daylight apertures, such as skylights and windows, but is coupled with a daylight-responsive lighting control system. Daylight positively impacts the psychological and physiological health of a human being by stimulating the human circadian rhythm, which can lower depression, improve sleep quality, reduce lethargy, and prevent illness.

However, studies do not always lead to a positive correlation between maximizing daylighting availability and human comfort and health. When large windows exist within the buildings, we need to control the quantity and the quality of the visual environment. A lack of attention to visual comfort issues often makes the best daylighting intentions ineffective due to excessive brightness and high contrast luminance ratios within the space which result in glare. Illuminating Engineering Society (IES)'s Lighting Handbook defines glare as the sensation produced by luminance levels in the visual field, sufficiently greater than those that our eyes can adapt to, that causes discomfort or loss in visual performance or visibility. Glare interferes with visual perception caused by an uncomfortably bright light source or reflection. If the occupants experience visual discomfort from excessive sunlight penetration through the windows of the buildings, they may wish to close the shading devices which would decrease the daylight availability and increase the electric lighting energy consumption.

Daylighting and visual comfort is an extensively studied topic in building science that allows for successful harvesting of daylighting and energy savings. It is critical that architects, engineers, and building owners use daylight and glare metrics to evaluate lighting conditions in daylit spaces for occupant health and comfort.

=== Indoor environmental quality (IEQ) ===
Indoor environmental quality (IEQ) refers to the quality of a building's environment in relation to the health and wellbeing of those who occupy space within it. IEQ is determined by many factors, including lighting, air quality, and temperature. Workers are often concerned that they have symptoms or health conditions from exposures to contaminants in the buildings where they work. One reason for this concern is that their symptoms often get better when they are not in the building. While research has shown that some respiratory symptoms and illnesses can be associated with damp buildings, it is still unclear what measurements of indoor contaminants show that workers are at risk for disease. In most instances where a worker and his or her physician suspect that the building environment is causing a specific health condition, the information available from medical tests and tests of the environment is not sufficient to establish which contaminants are responsible. Despite uncertainty about what to measure and how to interpret what is measured, research shows that building-related symptoms are associated with building characteristics, including dampness, cleanliness, and ventilation characteristics.

Indoor environments are highly complex and building occupants may be exposed to a variety of contaminants (in the form of gases and particles) from office machines, cleaning products, construction activities, carpets and furnishings, perfumes, cigarette smoke, water-damaged building materials, microbial growth (fungal, mold, and bacterial), insects, and outdoor pollutants. Other factors such as indoor temperatures, relative humidity, and ventilation levels can also affect how individuals respond to the indoor environment. Understanding the sources of indoor environmental contaminants and controlling them can often help prevent or resolve building-related worker symptoms. Practical guidance for improving and maintaining the indoor environment is available.

Building indoor environment covers the environmental aspects in the design, analysis, and operation of energy-efficient, healthy, and comfortable buildings. Fields of specialization include architecture, HVAC design, thermal comfort, indoor air quality (IAQ), lighting, acoustics, and control systems.

=== HVAC systems ===
The mechanical systems, usually a sub-set of the broader Building Services, used to control the temperature, humidity, pressure and other select aspects of the indoor environment are often described as the Heating, Ventilating, and Air-Conditioning (HVAC) systems. These systems have grown in complexity and importance (often consuming around 20% of the total budget in commercial buildings) as occupants demand tighter control of conditions, buildings become larger, and enclosures and passive measures became less important as a means of providing comfort.

Building science includes the analysis, design and operation of HVAC systems with respect to their physical impacts (e.g., heat distribution, air velocity, relative humidity), their influence on occupant comfort, and their implications for the electric grid. Since occupant comfort, HVAC efficiency, and load flexibility needs are influenced by many factors such as current weather conditions, the need for dynamic HVAC operation to deliver comfort in an energy-efficient and grid-interactive manner will vary across projects. Various HVAC control strategies have been implemented and studied to better contribute to occupants' comfort, energy efficiency and load flexibility. In the U.S., ASHRAE has published standards to help building managers and engineers design and operate the system. In the UK, a similar guideline was published by CIBSE. Apart from industry practice, advanced control strategies (e.g., Model Predictive Control and Reinforcement Learning) are widely discussed in research as well. For example, closed-loop feedback control can compare air temperature set-point with sensor measurements; demand response control can help prevent electric power-grid from having peak load by reducing or shifting their usage based on time-varying rate. With the improvement from computational performance and machine learning algorithms, model prediction on cooling and heating load with optimal control can further improve occupants comfort by pre-operating the HVAC system. It is recognized that advanced control strategies implementation is under the scope of developing Building Automation System (BMS) with integrated smart communication technologies, such as Internet of Things (IoT). However, one of the major obstacles identified by practitioners is the scalability of control logics and building data mapping due to the unique nature of building designs. It was estimated that due to inadequate interoperability, building industry loses $15.8 billion annually in the U.S. Recent research projects like Haystack and Brick intend to address the problem by utilizing metadata schema, which could provide more accurate and convenient ways of capturing data points and connection hierarchies in building mechanical systems. With the support of semantic models, automated configuration can further benefit HVAC control commissioning and software upgrades.

=== Enclosure (envelope) systems ===
The building enclosure is the part of the building that separates the indoors from the outdoors. This includes the wall, roof, windows, slabs on grade, and joints between all of these. The comfort, productivity, and even health of building occupants in areas near the building enclosure (i.e., perimeter zones) are affected by outdoor influences such as noise, temperature, and solar radiation, and by their ability to control these influences. As part of its function, the enclosure must control (not necessarily block or stop) the flow of moisture, heat, air, vapor, solar radiation, insects, or noise, while resisting the loads imposed on the structure (wind, seismic). Daylight transmittance through glazed components of the facade can be analyzed to evaluate the reduced need for electric lighting.

=== Building sustainability ===
Building sustainability, often referred to as sustainable design, integrates strategies to lower building environmental impacts, including lowering both operational carbon, which is the emissions from energy use during a building's life, and embodied carbon, which accounts for the emissions from material production and construction. Building sustainability practices aim to design with consideration for future resources and environmental realities.

Buildings are responsible for approximately 40% of global energy consumption and 13% carbon emissions, primarily related to building HVAC systems operation. Reducing operational carbon is critical to mitigate climate change. To address these emissions, renewable energy sources, such as solar and wind energy, are adopted by the building industry to support electricity generation. However, the electricity demand profile shows imbalance between supply and demand, which is known as the 'duck curve'. This could impact on maintaining grid system stability. Therefore, other strategies such as thermal energy storage systems are developed to achieve higher levels of sustainability by reducing grid peak power.

A push towards zero-energy building also known as Net-Zero Energy Building has been present in the Building Science field. The qualifications for Net Zero Energy Building Certification can be found on the Living Building Challenge website.

==== Embodied Carbon and Decarbonization ====
Embodied carbon refers to the total carbon emissions associated with the entire life cycle of a building material (i.e. material extraction, manufacturing and production, transportation, construction, and end of life). As building performance research has decreased operational carbon, there has been an increase in embodied carbon within the building sector, partly due to the higher material demands of energy-efficient designs. This shift has underscored the need to address embodied carbon alongside operational emissions to achieve holistic decarbonization.

Building decarbonization is most impactful during early-stage design, where materials, systems, and structural choices can be optimized to reduce embodied carbon and improve operational efficiency before moving forward in development stages. Structural materials, such as steel and concrete, contribute significantly to a building's embodied carbon footprint. Strategies to mitigate these impacts include material substitution, incorporating recycled and reused materials, and adopting low-carbon manufacturing processes.

Challenges in addressing embodied carbon include insufficient data, lack of standardization, cost considerations, and regulatory barriers. Reliable databases are often limited, region-specific, and inconsistent, making it difficult to apply universally. Existing standards are often voluntary and vary in scope, making comparisons and benchmarking difficult. Life cycle assessment standards for evaluating building embodied carbon include ISO 14040, ISO 14044, EN 15978, PAS 2050, and ReCiPe. These frameworks provide structured approaches to evaluate and quantify life cycle environmental impacts, such as embodied carbon.

Addressing embodied carbon is a growing aspect of building science, becoming critical for advancing building sustainability efforts and reducing the environmental impact of the built environment.

=== Post-Occupancy Evaluation (POE) ===
POE is a survey-based method to measure the building performance after the built environment was occupied. The occupant responses were collected through structured or open inquiries. Statistical methods and data visualization were often used to suggest which aspects(features) of the building were supportive or problematic to the occupants. The results may become design knowledge for architects to design new buildings or provide a data-basis to improve the current environment.

== Certification ==
Although there are no direct or integrated professional architecture or engineering certifications for building science, there are independent professional credentials associated with the disciplines. Building science is typically a specialization within the broad areas of architecture or engineering practice. However, there are professional organizations offering individual professional credentials in specialized areas. Some of the most prominent green building rating systems are:

- BREEAM (Building Research Establishment Environmental Assessment Method), which is the world's longest established sustainable building assessment system, developed by the Building Research Establishment;
- LEED (Leadership in Energy and Environmental Design), developed by the U.S. Green Building Council;
- Green Star (Australia), which is the main green building rating system in Australia, developed by the Green Building Council of Australia;
- WELL which is delivered by the International WELL Building Institute and administered by the Green Business Certification Inc.;
- CASBEE (Comprehensive Assessment System for Built Environment Efficiency), which is the main green building rating system in Japan;
- Living Building Challenge, developed by the International Living Future Institute;
- Passivhaus (Passive House), developed by the Passive House Institute, which is an internationally recognized, performance-based energy standard in construction.

There are other building sustainability accreditation and certification institutions as well. Also in the US, contractors certified by the Building Performance Institute, an independent organization, advertise that they operate businesses as Building Scientists. This is questionable due to their lack of scientific background and credentials. On the other hand, more formal building science experience is true in Canada for most of the Certified Energy Advisors. Many of these trades and technologists require and receive some training in very specific areas of building science (e.g., air tightness, or thermal insulation).

== List of principal building science journals ==
- Building and Environment: This international journal publishes original research papers and review articles related to building science, urban physics, and human interaction with the indoor and outdoor built environment. The journal's most cited articles cover topics such as occupant behavior in buildings, green building certification systems, and tunnel ventilation systems. Publisher: Elsevier. Impact Factor (2019): 4.971
- Energy and Buildings: This international journal publishes articles with explicit links to energy use in buildings. The aim is to present new research results, and new proven practice aimed at reducing the energy needs of a building and improving indoor air quality. The journal's most cited articles cover topics such as prediction models for building energy consumption, optimization models of HVAC systems, and life cycle assessment. Publisher: Elsevier. Impact Factor (2019): 4.867
- Indoor Air: This international journal publishes papers reflecting the broad categories of interest in the field of indoor environment of non-industrial buildings, including health effects, thermal comfort, monitoring and modelling, source characterization, and ventilation (architecture) and other environmental control techniques. The journal's most cited articles cover topics such as the impact of indoor air pollutants and thermal conditions on occupant performance, the movement of droplets in indoor environments, and the effects of ventilation rates on occupant health. Publisher: John Wiley & Sons. Impact Factor (2019): 4.739
- Architectural Science Review: Founded at the University of Sydney, Australia in 1958, this journal aims to promote the development, accumulation, and application of scientific knowledge on a wide range of environmental topics. According to the journal description, the topics may include but not limited to building science and technology, environmental sustainability, structures and materials, audio and acoustics, illumination, thermal systems, building physics, building services, building climatology, building economics, ergonomics, history and theory of architectural science, the social sciences of architecture. Publisher: Taylor & Francis Group
- Building Research and Information: This journal focuses on buildings, building stocks and their supporting systems. Unique to BRI is a holistic and transdisciplinary approach to buildings, which acknowledges the complexity of the built environment and other systems over their life. Published articles utilize conceptual and evidence-based approaches which reflect the complexity and linkages between culture, environment, economy, society, organizations, quality of life, health, well-being, design and engineering of the built environment. The journal's most cited articles cover topics such as the gap between performance and actual energy consumption, barriers and drivers for sustainable building, and the politics of resilient cities. Publisher: Taylor & Francis Group. Impact Factor (2019): 3.887
- Journal of Building Performance Simulation: This international, peer-reviewed journal publishes high quality research and state of the art "integrated" papers to promote scientifically thorough advancement of all the areas of non-structural performance of a building and particularly in heat transfer, air, moisture transfer. The journal's most cited articles cover topics such as co-simulation of building energy and control systems, the Buildings library, and the impact of occupant's behavior on building energy demand. Publisher: Taylor & Francis Group. Impact Factor (2019): 3.458
- LEUKOS: This journal publishes engineering developments, scientific discoveries, and experimental results related to light applications. Topics of interest include optical radiation, light generation, light control, light measurement, lighting design, daylighting, energy management, energy economics, and sustainability. The journal's most cited articles cover topics such as lighting design metrics, psychological processes influencing lighting quality, and the effects of lighting quality and energy-efficiency on task performance, mood, health, satisfaction, and comfort. Publisher: Taylor & Francis Group. Impact Factor (2019): 2.667
- Building Simulation: This international journal publishes original, high quality, peer-reviewed research papers and review articles dealing with modeling and simulation of buildings including their systems. The goal is to promote the field of building science and technology to such a level that modeling will eventually be used in every aspect of building construction as a routine instead of an exception. Of particular interest are papers that reflect recent developments and applications of modeling tools and their impact on advances of building science and technology. Publisher: Springer Nature. Impact Factor (2019): 2.472
- Applied Acoustics: This journal covers research findings related to practical applications of acoustics in engineering and science. The journal's most cited articles related to building science cover topics such as the prediction of the sound absorption of natural materials, the implementation of low-cost urban acoustic monitoring devices, and sound absorption of natural kenaf fibers. Publisher: Elsevier. Impact Factor (2019): 2.440
- Lighting Research & Technology: This journal covers all aspects of light and lighting, including the human response to light, light generation, light control, light measurement, lighting design equipment, daylighting, energy efficiency of lighting design, and sustainability. The journal's most cited articles cover topics such as light as a circadian stimulus for architectural lighting, human perceptions of color rendition, and the influence of color gamut size and shape on color preference. Publisher: SAGE Publishing. Impact Factor (2019): 2.226

== See also ==
- Architectural engineering
- Architectural Institute of Japan
- Architecture
- ASHRAE
- Building enclosure commissioning
- Central Building Research Institute, India
- Galvanic corrosion
- Indoor air quality
- Kansas Building Science Institute
- National Institute of Building Sciences
- Passive House
- Seismic analysis
- Sustainable refurbishment
- Vapor barrier
