= Qingyan Chen =

Qingyan Chen, also called Chen Qingyan (陳清焰, surname first) or shortly Yan Chen, is a Fellow of the Royal Society, Chair Professor and the Director of the PolyU Academy for Interdisciplinary Research (PAIR) at the Hong Kong Polytechnic University. He is also professor emeritus of Mechanical Engineering at Purdue University in the United States, and former editor-in-chief of the academic journal Building and Environment (2006–2024).

He is an expert on air flow in closed spaces, and has, for example, developed mathematical models for coughing. During the COVID-19 pandemic he used his research on how to track the spread of air particles in passenger vehicles to develop mathematical models for the spread of the virus in cruise ships, aeroplanes and other vehicles.

== Academic career ==
Chen received his bachelor's degree in 1983 from Tsinghua University in China, and his master's degree (1985) and Ph.D. (1988) from Delft University of Technology in the Netherlands. From 1989 to 1991, he was a Research Scientist at the Swiss Federal Institute of Technology (ETH-Zurich). He then worked as a Project Manager for the Netherlands Organization for Applied Scientific Research, before moving to the United States, where he served as an Assistant and associate professor at the Massachusetts Institute of Technology from 1992 to 2002. From 2002 to 2021, he served as a professor of mechanical engineering at Purdue University.

In 2021, Professor Chen moved to Hong Kong to take a chair professorship in the Hong Kong Polytechnic University. The Hong Kong government awarded him the International STEM Professor. Currently, Chen is

- Chair professor of the Hong Kong Polytechnic University;
- Director of PolyU Academy for Interdisciplinary Research;
- Emeritus professor of Purdue University.
- New Millennium Yuelu Outstanding Visiting professor of Hunan University

== Awards ==
Chen was elected as a Fellow of the Hong Kong Academy of Engineering in 2022, and a Fellow of the Royal Society in 2026.

In 1996, Chen won the CAREER Award, given to outstanding junior faculty. In 2007, Chen was honored with the Willis J. Whitfield Award "for significant contributions to the field of contamination control through numerous published papers, studies, and reports" In 2011, the Scandinavian Association of Heating, Air and Health Authorities in the United States, Finland, Iceland, Norway and Sweden (SCANVAC) awarded him the John Rydberg Gold Medal for his “outstanding contribution to the advancement of air conditioning and storage performance”.

== Research interests ==
Professor Chen's current research interests include (a) Computer Simulations and Experiment Measurements of Built Environments, and (b) Energy-efficient, Healthy and Sustainable Buildings. He has published nearly 300 SCI-indexed academic journal papers, and is a former editor-in-chief of the journal Building and Environment (2006–2024).

== See also ==
- Building science
- Hong Kong Polytechnic University
- Royal Society
