= Morton v Douglas Homes Ltd =

New Zealand High Court case

- Court: Christchurch High Court
- Decided: 24 May 1983
- Citation: [1984] 2 NZLR 548

Court membership
- Judge sitting: Hardie Boys J

Keywords
- Negligence, Piercing the corporate veil, Directors' liabilities, Corporate personality, Corporate law,

Morton v Douglas Homes Ltd has become an important case in New Zealand, as a result of the leaky homes crisis. The salience of the case comes from the fact that Justice Hardie Boys held the directors of a building company personally liable for damage caused by defective foundations. The case has been described in the Court of Appeal as one that, "certainly provides some authority for the view that the directors of a building company with actual control of particular building operations owe a duty of care, associated with that control."

== Background ==
Between 1976 and 1977, Douglas Homes Ltd built four flats in a residential subdivision in Waimairi County, Canterbury over the top of an old shingle pit. Before construction, "the directors had been advised by an engineer on the work necessary for the laying of foundations for two flats. One of the directors did not ensure that the engineer’s advice was adhered to in the construction of the foundations of one flat. The other director specifically took charge of the works on the other, and failed to ensure the engineer’s advice was followed."

== Judgment ==
Hardie Boys J reasoned that the directors of Douglas Homes Ltd could be held liable for their negligence as, "The principle of limited liability protects shareholders and not directors, and a director is as responsible for his own torts as any other servant or agent."

Hardie Boys J held that in establishing whether a director owed a duty of care the test was to be that established in Anns v Merton London Borough Council [1978] AC 728 and that a duty of care was founded upon the control a director exercised over the operations of a company.

The relevance of the degree of control which a director has over the operations of the company is that it provides a test of whether or not his personal carelessness may be likely to cause damage to a third party, so that he becomes subject to a duty of care. It is not the fact that he is a director that creates the control, but rather that the fact of control, however derived, may create the duty. There is therefore no essential difference in this respect between a director and a general manager or indeed a more humble employee of the company. Each is under a duty of care, both to those with whom he deals on the company's behalf and to those with whom the company deals in so far as that dealing is subject to his control.

— Hardie Boys J, Morton v Douglas Homes Ltd'

== Significance ==
The ratio has not yet been overturned and as such remains a precedent for holding directors liable for defects in construction that was under their control. In 2006 in Dicks v Hobson Swan Construction Limited (in liquidation), Justice Baragwanath applied the ratio of the case to hold a director personally liable for a leaky building constructed by his company. In a 2010 appeal from the Weathertight Homes Tribunal Justice Wylie noted the correct approach to searching for directorial liability lay through the test articulated in Morton v Douglas Homes Ltd;

...it should have asked itself whether the elements of the tort of negligence were made out against each of [the directors]. In doing so, it should have borne in mind the presumption against the imposition of personal responsibility where the director was simply acting on behalf of the company. It should have asked itself whether the director assumed personal liability for the relevant conduct. The degree of control test articulated by Hardie Boys J in Morton is likely to be of considerable help in answering that question.

— Wylie J, Chee v Stareast Investment Limited'
