= Building and Environment =

- Language: English
- Edited by: Chao-Hsin Lin, Xudong Yang

Publication details
- Former name: Building Science
- History: 1965–present
- Publisher: Elsevier
- Frequency: Semimonthly
- Open access: Hybrid
- Impact factor: 7.1 (2023)

Standard abbreviations
- ISO 4: Build. Environ.

Indexing
- ISSN: 0360-1323 (print); 1873-684X (web)
- LCCN: 78649044
- OCLC no.: 38871233

Links
- Journal homepage; Online archive

Building and Environment is a semimonthly peer-reviewed scientific journal which focuses on building science, human interaction with built environment, as well as their applications to building design and operation. It was established in 1965 as Building Science, changing to the current name in 1976. It is published by Elsevier and the editors-in-chief are Chao-Hsin Lin (Boeing) and Xudong Yang (Tsinghua University). Qingyan Chen was editor-in-chief 2006-2024.

== Abstracting and indexing ==
The journal is abstracted and indexed in:

- Current Contents/Engineering, Computing & Technology
- EBSCO databases
- GEOBASE
- Science Citation Index Expanded
- Scopus

According to the Journal Citation Reports, the journal has a 2023 impact factor of 7.1.
