= Rainscreen =

Form of exterior wall cladding

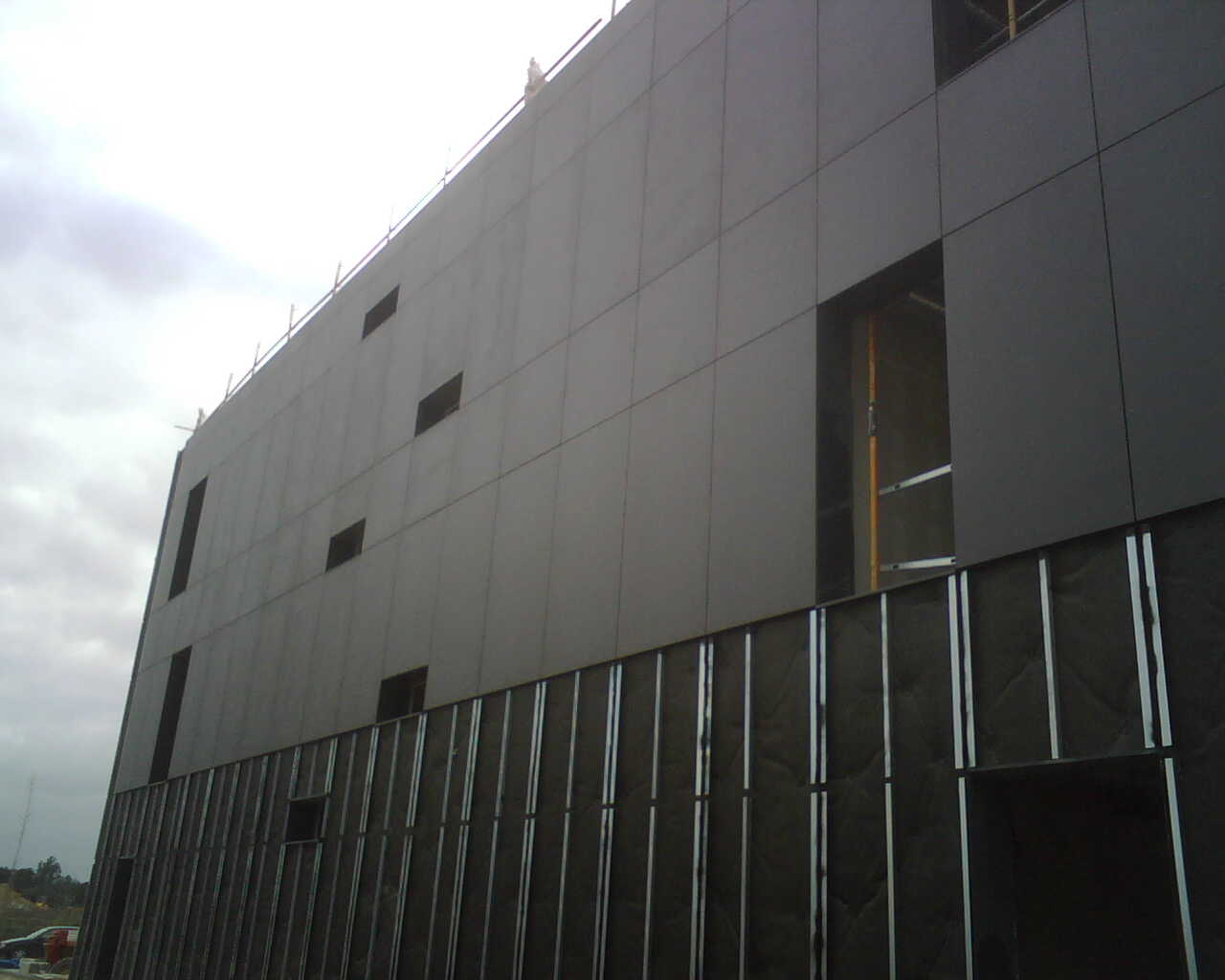
Rainscreen cladding

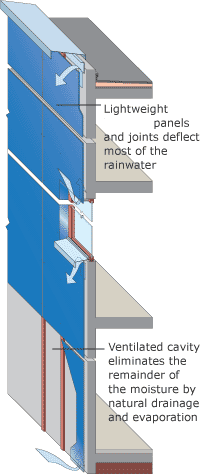
Rainscreen cladding principle

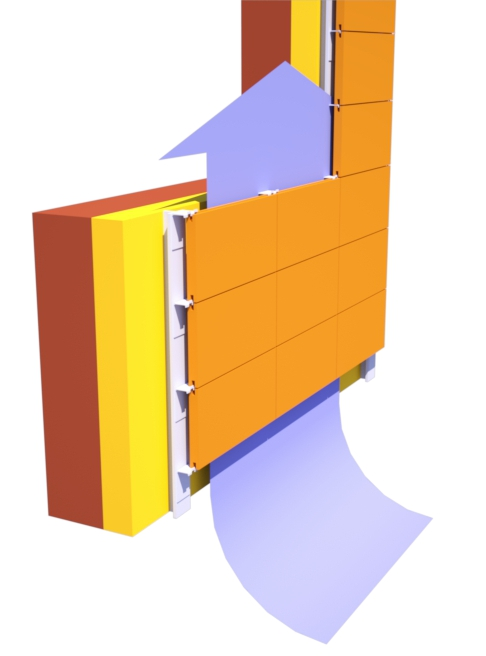
Air circulating scheme

A rainscreen is an exterior wall detail where the siding (wall cladding) stands off from the moisture-resistant surface of an air/water barrier applied to the sheathing to create a capillary break and to allow drainage and evaporation. The rainscreen is the cladding or siding itself but the term rainscreen implies a system of building. Ideally the rainscreen prevents the wall air/water barrier from getting wet but because of cladding attachments and penetrations (such as windows and doors) water is likely to reach this point, and hence materials are selected to be moisture tolerant and integrated with flashing. In some cases a rainscreen wall is called a pressure-equalized rainscreen wall where the ventilation openings are large enough for the air pressure to nearly equalize on both sides of the rain screen, but this name has been criticized as being redundant and is only useful to scientists and engineers.

Rainscreen cladding is a kind of double-wall construction that utilizes a surface to help keep the rain out, as well as an inner layer to offer thermal insulation, prevent excessive air leakage and carry wind loading. The surface breathes just like a skin as the inner layer reduces energy losses.

== Definitions ==
A screen in general terms is a barrier. The rainscreen in a wall is sometimes defined as the first layer of material on the wall, the siding itself. Also, rainscreen is defined as the entire system of the siding, drainage plane and a moisture/air barrier. A veneer that does not stand off from the wall sheathing to create a cavity is not a rainscreen. However, a masonry veneer can be a rainscreen wall if it is ventilated.

Many terms have been applied to rain screen walls including basic, open, conventional, pressure-equalized, pressure-moderated rainscreen systems or assemblies. These terms have caused confusion as to what a rain screen is but all reflect the rainscreen principle of a primary and secondary line of defense. One technical difference is between a plane (a gap of 3/8 inch (9.5 mm) or less) and a channel (a gap of more than 3/8 inch (9.5 mm)).

In general terms a rainscreen wall may be called a cavity or drained wall. The two other basic types of exterior walls in terms of water resistance are barrier walls which rely on the one exterior surface to prevent ingress and mass walls which allow but absorb some leakage.

== History ==
In the early 1960s research was conducted in Norway on rain penetration of windows and walls, and Øivind Birkeland published a treatise referring to a "rain barrier". In 1963 the Canadian National Research Council published a pamphlet titled "Rain Penetration and its Control" using the term "open rain screen".

== The rainscreen system ==
For water to enter a wall first the water must get onto the wall and the wall must have openings. Water can then enter the wall by capillary action, gravity, momentum, and air pressure (wind). The rainscreen system provides for two lines of defense against the water intrusion into the walls: The rainscreen and a means to dissipate leakage often referred to as a channel. In a rainscreen the air gap allows the circulation of air on the moisture barrier. (These may or may not serve as a vapour barrier, which can be installed on the interior or exterior side of the insulation depending on the climate). This helps direct water away from the main exterior wall which in many climates is insulated. Keeping the insulation dry helps prevent problems such as mold formation and water leakage. The vapour-permeable air/weather barrier prevents water molecules from entering the insulated cavity but allows the passage of vapour, thus reducing the trapping of moisture within the main wall assembly.

The air gap (or cavity) can be created in several ways. One method is to use furring (battens, strapping) fastened vertically to the wall. Ventilation openings are made at the bottom and top of the wall so air can naturally rise through the cavity. Wall penetrations including windows and doors require special care to maintain the ventilation. In the pressure-equalized system the ventilation openings must be large enough to allow air-flow to equalize the pressure on both sides of the cladding. A ratio of 10:1 cladding leakage area to ventilation area has been suggested.

A water/air resistant membrane is placed between the furring and the sheathing to prevent rain water from entering the wall structure. The membrane directs water away and toward special drip edge flashings which protect other parts of the building.

Insulation may be provided beneath the membrane. The thickness of insulation is determined by building code requirements as well as performance requirements set out by the architect.

The system is a form of double-wall construction that uses an outer layer to keep out the rain and an inner layer to provide thermal insulation, prevent excessive air leakage and carry wind loading. The outer layer breathes like a skin while the inner layer reduces energy losses. The structural frame of the building is kept absolutely dry, as water never reaches it or the thermal insulation. Evaporation and drainage in the cavity removes water that penetrates between panel joints. Water droplets are not driven through the panel joints or openings because the rainscreen principle means that wind pressure acting on the outer face of the panel is equalized in the cavity. Therefore, there is no significant pressure differential to drive the rain through joints. During extreme weather, a minimal amount of water may penetrate the outer cladding. This, however, will run as droplets down the back of the cladding sheets and be dissipated through evaporation and drainage.

== The rainscreen drainage plane ==
Typical layers in a wall system with rainscreen drainage plane

A rainscreen drainage plane is an air gap and the water resistant barrier of a rainscreen. Together they provide a predictable, unobstructed path drainage for liquid moisture to drain from a high point of the wall (where it enters) to a low point of the wall (where it exits) the wall detail. The drainage plane must move the water out of the wall system quickly to prevent absorption and consequential rot, mold, and structural degradation.

A drainage plane

is designed to shed bulk rainwater and/or condensation downward and outward in a manner that will prevent uncontrolled water penetration into the conditioned spaces of a building or structure. In a barrier wall system, the exterior cladding also serves as the principal drainage plane and primary line of defense against bulk rainwater penetration. In cavity wall construction, however, the principal drainage plane and primary line of defense against bulk rainwater penetration is located inside the wall cavity, generally on the inboard side of the air space (either directly applied to the outboard surface of the exterior sheathing layer or, in the case of insulated cavity walls, on the outboard surface of the rigid or otherwise moisture-impervious insulation layer).

=== A predictable pressure equalization plane ===
Air pressure difference is one of the forces for driving a rainwater into wall systems but gravity is more often the cause of practical problems. A rainscreen drainage plane that works as a predictable pressure equalization plane creates a separation (an air chamber) between the backside of a rainscreen and the exterior surface of the weather-resistant barrier that is installed on the exterior sheeting of the structural back up wall. This separation allows air contaminated with water vapor from all points in that wall system to exit the interior of the wall system. Moisture laden air that is allowed to pressurize will attempt to move to a lower pressure area that may be deeper into the interior of a wall detail.

=== Technical considerations ===
- To prevent bridging due to capillary action, Building Science Consulting recommends the drainage plane maintain a cavity of ^{3}/_{8}" (9.525 mm) or greater, though smaller cavities with hydrophobic materials can also provide the capillary break. Independently verified testing by manufacturer Masonry Technology Inc. demonstrates that a ^{3}/_{16}" (4.7625 mm) depth is sufficient for drainage and airflow as well.
- Ensure that the drainage plane does not compress when installed so that it maintains an acceptable air space.
- Similarly, ensure that the drainage plane isn't plugged by debris which commonly is present in the form of mortar squeezings or excess stucco. Some mechanical drainage planes include measures to prevent clogging.
- Ensure that the drainage plane creates a compartmentalized pressure equalization plane to prevent pressure driven moisture intrusion.
- Details at top and bottom terminations of a wall system should accommodate moisture drainage (often termed "weeping") and air flow to properly dry out the wall.
- ASTM International Standards include a standard test for drainage plane systems in EIFS Systems under code ASTM E2273 and the International Code Council features a more general "Evaluation guideline for a moisture drainage system used with exterior wall veneers" under code ICC-ES EG356.
- Inappropriate rain screen materials may also introduce a risk of fast-spreading external fires.
- Insects and possibly also rodents (→metal mesh) and bats should be prevented from entering into the airgap at intake or exhaust ventilation openings. Recommended aperture sizes for insect meshes are 3 to 4 millimeters. Effectiveness dwindles rapidly with bigger ones, smaller ones tend to clog quickly.

=== Entrapped moisture risks ===
Once moisture has penetrated deep into a wall system through the weather resistant barrier and into the exterior sheathing, the wall is deep wet. The air flow that exists in most wall systems is a slight draft that will not dry this condition out in a timely manner. The result is a compromised wall system with rot, rust, and mold potential. The structural integrity of the wall is at stake, as is the health of the occupants. The longer the wall remains wet, the greater the risk. 50% percent of homes suffer from mold problems. Billions of dollars are spent annually on litigation involving mold and rot problems stemming from entrapped moisture; this has created an entire industry centered around construction litigation. Such litigation has caused insurance premiums for contractors to increase significantly and has made it difficult for contractors involved in moisture related lawsuits to obtain insurance at all. An effective rainscreen drainage plane system mitigates this risk.

==== Danger levels ====
Wood Moisture Equivalent Graph

Dampness levels in construction are measured in wood moisture equivalent (WME) percentages and is calculated as follows:

${\frac{\text{wet sample weight} - \text{dry sample weight}}{\text{dry sample weight}}} \times 100 = WME$

A normal range is 8–13% WME, with fungal growth beginning at the 16% threshold. A 20% WME is enough to promote wood rot. It logically follows that the more time a part of a wall system exceeds one of these thresholds the greater chance of damage from fungal growth or rot.

== See also ==
- Curtain wall (architecture)
- Double-skin facade
- Interstitial condensation
