= Leaky homes crisis =

Construction and legal crisis in New Zealand

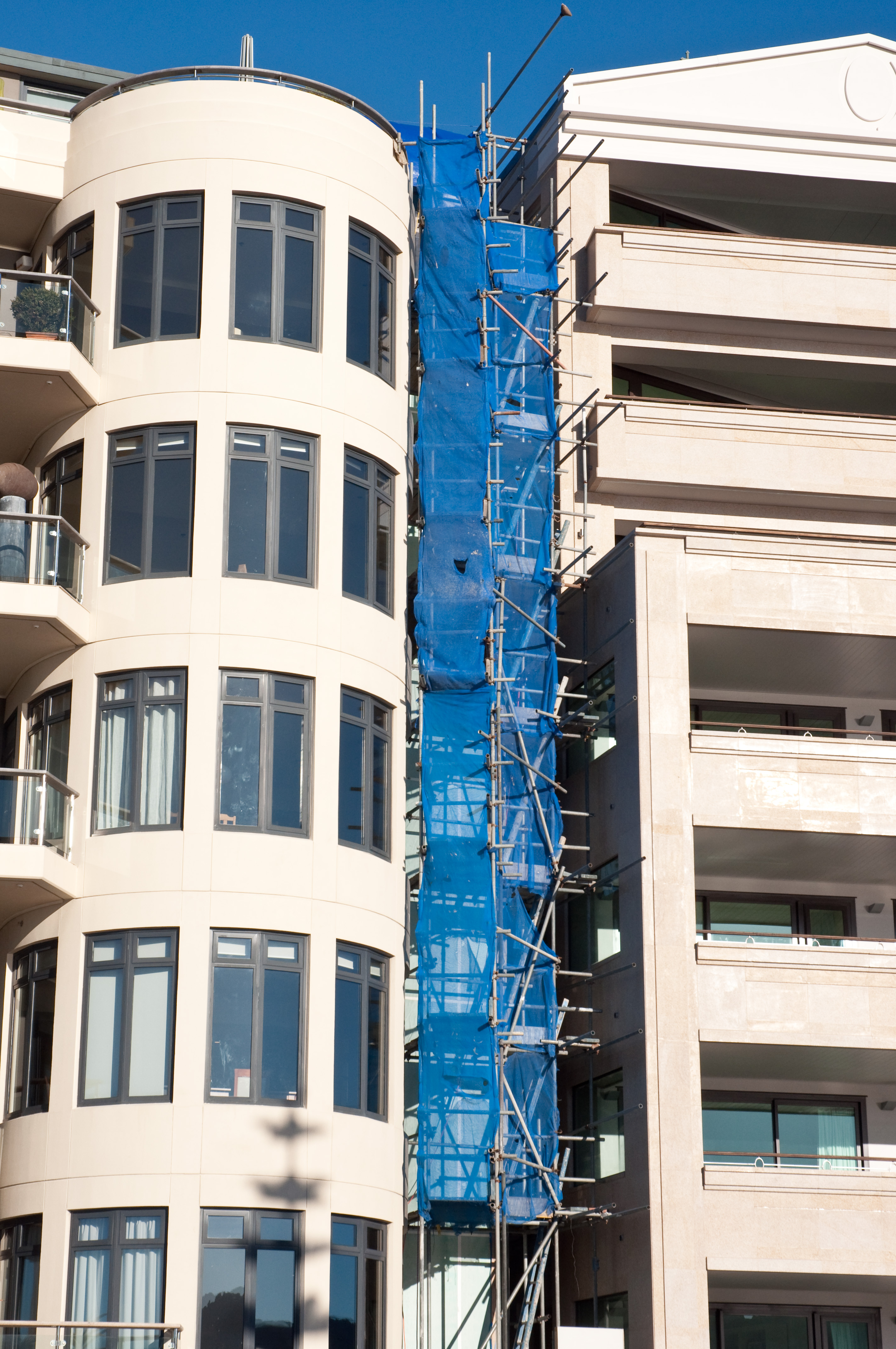
Repair of leaky apartments, Oriental Bay, Wellington in 2010

The leaky homes crisis is an ongoing construction and legal crisis in New Zealand concerning timber-framed homes built from 1988 to 2004 that were not fully weather-tight. The problems often include the decay of timber framing which, in extreme cases, have made buildings structurally unsound. Some buildings have become unhealthy to live in due to moulds and spores developing within the damp timber framing. The repairs and replacement costs that may have been avoided were estimated in 2009 to be approximately NZ$11.3 billion.

== Factors ==
The Building Act 1991, which became law in 1993, changed building controls from a prescriptive system to a more self-regulated regime. In addition, the Government dropped the apprentice training system for builders and the related building trades. Some developers and builders knowingly or carelessly constructed buildings with numerous faults and short-cuts. An architectural design trend towards Mediterranean-style houses with complex roofs, plastered exterior walls, internal decks and small or no eaves also factored in.

Some local authorities were later found to have issued Building Consents based on insufficient documentation, failed to carry out inspection of the work during construction, and issued code compliance certificates for buildings which were later found to have leaking problems. Consequently some councils now share significant financial responsibilities with the builders (which in many cases have closed or otherwise removed themselves from liability) and the owners. Court cases have generally assigned around one third of the financial responsibility to local authorities. A 2013 Supreme Court case involving the Auckland City Council extended the liability of local bodies.

== Causes ==
There are many reasons that some buildings from the late 1980s were leaky.

=== Cladding systems ===
A major one was the increase in the use of cladding systems such as fibre cement sheet (generic name Fibrolite in New Zealand) and EIPS (Externally Insulated Plaster System) that relied on a paint finish as the primary defence against water ingress. This system is very similar to Exterior insulation finishing system (or EIFS). Such cladding systems typically allowed for little construction or thermal movement so that fine cracks that appeared insignificant, and would have been relatively insignificant in traditional claddings such as weatherboard, allowed continuous ingress of moisture into the framing. These causes, combined with the reduced air movement through the prevalence of sheet cladding or sheet insulating materials for the monolithic look cladding, resulted in very damp conditions which are ideal for rot. A further exacerbating factor that resulted in more significant damage from the leaks, was the change to the New Zealand Standard for Timber Treatment in 1995, allowing the use of untreated Pinus radiata (radiata pine) timber for wall framing. As this timber has little natural resistance to rot when wet, damage occurs more quickly.

In many cases claddings were not used within their specifications or not installed correctly. Many buildings built in the "Mediterranean" style used these types of cladding and had features such as recessed windows, flat roofs, minimal eaves, multiple storeys, complex roofs, solid balustrades, balconies and penetrations of the exterior cladding that increased the likelihood of water infiltrating the structure.

=== Drawings ===
Lack of detailed drawings for buildings was also a contributing factor. Some builders were unable to make a weathertight structure without proper guidance. This has partially been blamed on the breakdown of the apprenticeship system and unqualified builders in the marketplace. Council staff carrying out building inspections had neither the required construction expertise to ensure weathertightness nor the intuition to look for it.

=== Juvenile sapwood ===
A likely major contributing factor was the exhaustion of New Zealand's "First Rotation" (50-60 year old) radiata pine crop in the late 1980s, and the change to using short rotation 25-30 year old radiata pine at the same time. Overseas studies of similar short-rotation produced juvenile sapwood had concluded it was so different from "normal" wood that it would be wise to treat it as though it were a completely different species. New methodologies to utilise the wood would have to be developed.

A crash research-project by the New Zealand Forest Research Institute to, amongst other objectives, attempt to identify how the new crop Radiata could safely be used in construction took place between 1995 and 1998. That project gave rise to many of the innovations and regulatory measures later implemented to attempt to allow for safe construction using juvenile sapwood including, notably, the rise of LVL and other laminated structural products.

== Aftermath ==
The Building Act 1991 was replaced by the Building Act 2004, which introduced a licensing scheme for building designers, builders and related trades. Councils were required to be registered with a central authority and were to be subject to regular quality control procedure checks. Council building inspectors remain unlicensed.

The Government dissolved the BIA (Building Industry Authority, the Government department which was responsible for the oversight and administration of the building sector) on 30 November 2004 and replaced it with DBH (Department of Building and Housing).

Some of the Acceptable Solutions to the Building Code were re-written, most notably E2/AS1 External Moisture which covers the detailing of roofs and walls was greatly expanded.

The Standard covering durability of timber framing was amended in late 2003 with the publication of NZS 3602: 2003 Timber and Wood-based Products for Use in Building. This revision required a return to the use of treated radiata framing in external walls.

The Overview Group on the Weathertightness of Buildings that was appointed by the Building Industry Authority ("the BIA") to investigate the causes of the leaky building crisis did receive several submissions (including from the New Zealand Institute of Forestry, but not apparently from the New Zealand Forest Research Institute) suggesting that the reduced rotation age of the then current Radiata Crop might be a causal factor in the leaky building crisis.

In its final 2002 report the Overview Group recommended to the BIA that research be conducted as to whether there were any "issues regarding the structural strength and durability with respect to the maturity of timber". The outcome of that recommendation is currently unknown, with the Ministry of Business, Innovation and Employment advising in July 2019 that it had been unable to locate any records at all relating to any research or consultation having been undertaken in response to the Overview Group's recommendation.

=== Housing affected ===
Several thousands of homes throughout the country are still awaiting renovation, with a total cost that has been estimated by a Price Waterhouse Coopers report to the Government in 2008 as being around NZ$11.3 billion for a "consensus estimate" of 42,000 buildings. Other building experts estimate the true cost at $23 billion for 89,000 buildings, and accused government of reducing the figure of affected buildings to 42,000 buildings because they were allegedly "unhappy" with the expert prediction.

=== Other buildings ===
The majority of affected buildings are homes or apartments, but in 2011 the twenty-year-old Ronald McDonald House for children with cancer and their families at Wellington Hospital was demolished as leaky and replaced.

=== Schools affected ===
The Minister of Education said in 2009 that at least 73 schools were affected, and in 2011 that 157 schools still needed repairs, at an estimated cost of at least $1.5 billion As of 2013 the Ministry of Education was taking action against architects and builders involved with 87 of the 309 schools which have "leakiness" problems. One school in Wellington, Seatoun School, built at a cost of $5.3 million and opened in 2002 is costing $4.5 million to repair.

=== Financial liabilities ===
As of mid-2009, plans for an up to NZ$6 billion bailout package shared between government and local authorities are in doubt because the amount could affect New Zealand's international credit rating. In November 2009, the National government decided not to offer a more substantial sharing of costs, and it is now estimated that in most cases, around 64% would have to be borne by the owners, 26% by Councils, and only 10% by government funds, while also forcing homeowners to sign away their rights to sue for more.

Prime Minister John Key noted that while claimants did not have to accept the settlement, legal costs for bringing suit could eat up any further money awarded to them. Some claimants have taken negligence claims against company directors of construction companies, relying on the decision in Morton v Douglas Homes Ltd [1984] 2 NZLR 548. There have also been accusations that parts of the legal and inspection professions are profiting substantially from disputes around the cases, and that significant money was diverted into these channels rather than into fixing the buildings. The government's position was assailed by mayors of affected Councils and by pundits, who noted that by paying only 10%, and then receiving 12.5% back in goods and services tax, the government was actually making money from the crisis. Another report commissioned by North Shore City Council estimated a potential gain by government of up to $2 billion. Further, National was also criticised that as an opposition party, they had constantly asked for the then Labour-led government to assist homeowners financially.

The government has also imposed a 10-year limit (after construction) on claims, even though some building experts believe many cases will only become apparent during coming years, as building rot becomes advanced enough. They also warned that houses in drier parts of New Zealand were now starting to show problems, which had simply developed at a slower pace – and that despite Building Act reforms in 2004, there were still houses being built that leaked badly due to shoddy workmanship. Timber needs a sustained period of wetting to form mould and subsequently rot. In laymens terms, the timber has to be wet longer than it is dry. In drier areas of the country it is unlikely the timber will remain wet long enough to instigate mould formation.

In February 2010, New Zealand's Building and Construction Minister Maurice Williamson, National, warned that the size of the issue, at least $11 billion, was so gianormous [sic] that even a government with budget surpluses would struggle. He noted that: "...a Government who's [sic] running deficits - and has a forecast track of deficits for many years out - has to just sit there with its head in its hands, saying, 'Well, I just don't how to do this'." He also warned that it was necessary to come up with a solution so money could be spent on fixing houses, rather than paying lawyers, and that there was a risk of significant rates rises in the major centres like Auckland, Tauranga, Wellington and Christchurch, of a scale that would "make eyes water".

In May 2010 the New Zealand Government launched the Financial Assistance Package (FAP) for leaky homes, which expired in 2016. Under the scheme, the home owner shared the agreed cost of repairing their home with the government and the local council, if the council approved the original work and was participating in the scheme. The government and the council each contributed 25% of the repair cost with the owner paying the remaining 50%. Despite the FAP offering to give the homeowners the certainty of financial contribution and to help get leaky homes fixed faster, by November 2012 only 12 victims had received final payouts under the government scheme.

In 2009 it was estimated between 22,000 and 89,000 properties were affected, but the government's scheme would cover around 3,500 at the most.

=== Rates impact ===
Councils and politicians have indicated that the crisis could increase rates bills. From mid-2011, council must take leaky home syndrome into account when re-valuing homes, even if the home has not leaked. This takes into account that such homes face widespread stigma and are harder to sell. The lower values meant some owners paid 5% to 20% less for their rates, but other ratepayers had to pay more to make up the difference.

=== Effect on liable firms ===
The placing into liquidation of Mainzeal Construction and Property, New Zealand’s third largest construction company, in February 2013 was blamed on both a slowdown in commercial construction work and liability for several leaky apartment buildings in Auckland and Wellington where other parties had gone out of existence.

== Similarities to British Columbia ==
A similar problem arose in the early 1980s, some 10 years before New Zealand and for similar reasons, in the Canadian province of British Columbia. It is commonly known in Canada as the leaky condo crisis and has been an ongoing issue that is estimated to have caused $4 billion in damage since the 1980s.

== See also ==
- Housing in New Zealand
