= Lighting Research & Technology =

- Discipline: Engineering
- Language: English
- Edited by: Steve Fotios

Publication details
- Former names: International Journal of Lighting Research and Technology, Transactions of the Illuminating Engineering Society
- History: 1969-present
- Publisher: SAGE Publications
- Frequency: Quarterly
- Open access: Hybrid
- Impact factor: 2.2 (2023)

Standard abbreviations
- ISO 4: Light. Res. Technol.

Indexing
- CODEN: LRTEA9
- ISSN: 1477-1535 (print); 1477-0938 (web)
- LCCN: 2001252688
- OCLC no.: 516681060

Links
- Journal homepage; Online access; Online archive

Lighting Research & Technology is a peer-reviewed scientific journal covering all aspects of light and lighting. Its editor-in-chief is Steve Fotios (University of Sheffield). It was established in 1969 and is published by SAGE Publications on behalf of the Society of Light and Lighting (part of the Chartered Institution of Building Services Engineers). Before 1969, when the SLL was known by another name, it published Transactions of the Illuminating Engineering Society. Notably, the historical IES based in London is not to be confused with the Illuminating Engineering Society based in New York.

== Abstracting and indexing ==
The journal is abstracted and indexed in Scopus and the Science Citation Index Expanded. According to the Journal Citation Reports, its 2023 impact factor is 2.2.
