= Building enclosure commissioning =

Building Enclosure Commissioning (BECx) (sometimes 'envelope' is used instead of 'enclosure') is a quality-focused process wherein the energy performance of a facility, system or assembly is evaluated and verified against defined objectives and criteria.

The process itself is carried out by a commissioning team which uses reliable and accurate measures to verify that the project is meeting specific quality requirements outlined by the owner of the project. The commissioning process begins at project inception and runs through different construction phases, which include a pre-design phase, pre-construction phase and construction phase. Once the construction is finished, the commissioning process continues and becomes an ongoing routine in the life of the facility. Specific information regarding the commissioning process is outlined in the ASHRAE Guideline 0-2005: The Commissioning Process. This and several other technical support guidelines to the Guideline 0-2005 document provide specific information related to the commissioning process.

== See also ==
- Building envelope – Concept in architectural and engineering practice
- Building services engineering – Professional engineering discipline
- National Institute of Building Sciences

== Bibliography ==
- ASTM E2813, Standard Practice for Building Enclosure Commissioning;
- ASTM E2947, Standard Guide for Building Enclosure Commissioning (Not yet published. This standard is scheduled to replace NIBS Guideline 3-2006 and 2012 upon publication);
- ASHRAE Standard 202, Commissioning Process for Buildings and Systems
