= Climate of London =

London, United Kingdom

Climate chart (precipitation, max. and min. temperature)
J	F	M	A	M	J	J	A	S	O	N	D
59 8 3	45 9 3	39 12 4	42 15 6	46 18 9	47 22 12	46 24 14	53 23 14	50 20 12	65 16 9	67 11 5	57 9 3
- █ Average max. and min. temperatures in °C
- █ Precipitation totals in mm
Imperial conversion
J	F	M	A	M	J	J	A	S	O	N	D
2.3 47 37	1.8 48 37	1.5 53 39	1.7 59 43	1.8 65 48	1.9 71 54	1.8 75 58	2.1 74 57	2 68 53	2.6 60 48	2.6 53 41	2.2 48 38
- █ Average max. and min. temperatures in °F
- █ Precipitation totals in inches

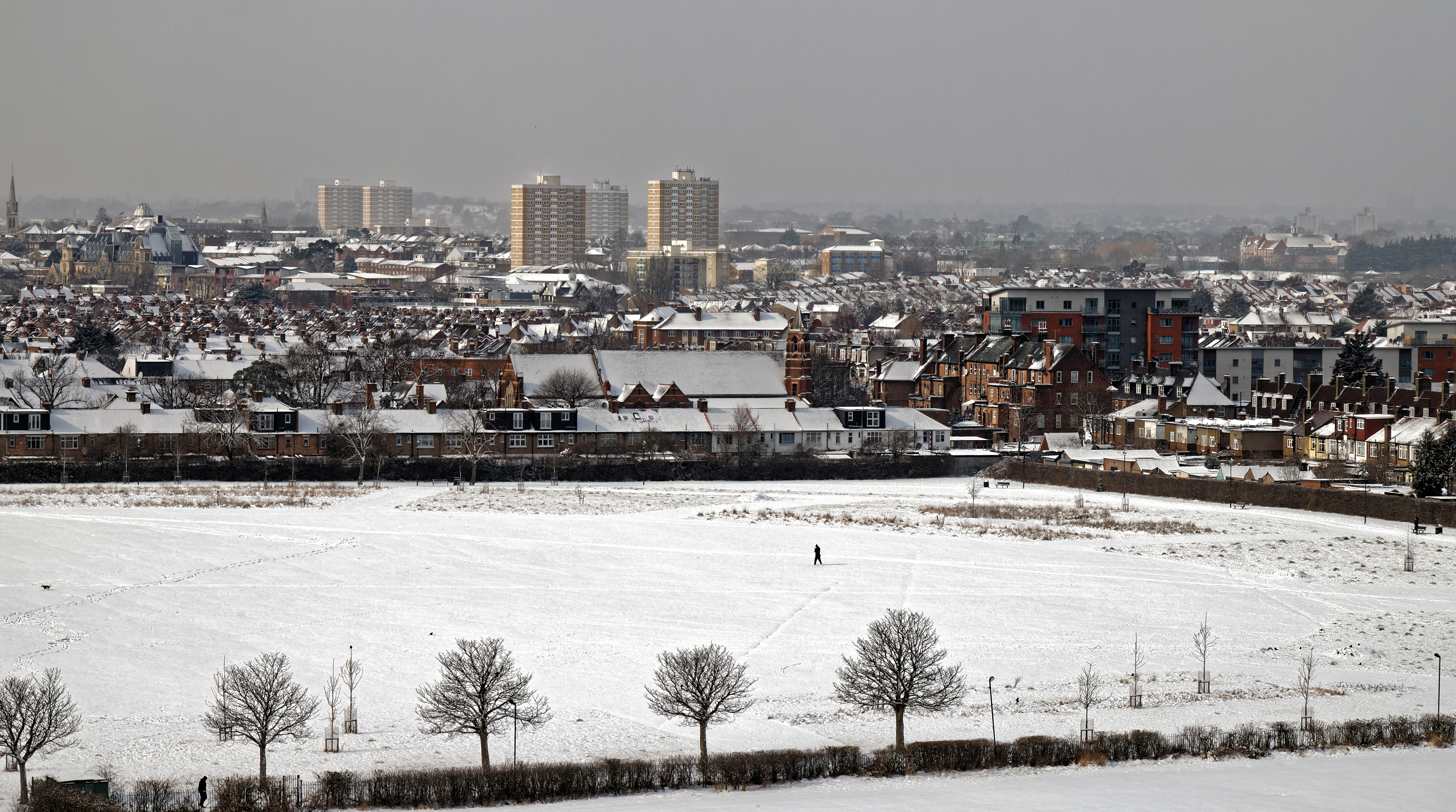
London on a snowy day in 2018

According to the Köppen climate classification, London has a temperate oceanic climate (Cfb). This type of climate features cool winters with frequent cloudy skies and rain showers (and on occasion snow), and warm summers. Precipitation is fairly evenly distributed all year round.

London has a long history of meteorological observations, with precipitation records beginning as early as January 1697 at Kew Gardens. Irregular observations were made at multiple locations in the ensuing years. An observing station has been located at Greenwich since 1841, giving London its longest continuous reliable temperature series. Other stations include Heathrow, beginning in 1948, Hampstead, beginning in 1910, Northolt, beginning in 1948, and St James's Park, beginning in 1910.

The highest temperature ever observed in London is 40.2 °C (104.4 °F) recorded at both Heathrow Airport and St James's Park on 19 July 2022 and the lowest is −17.4 °C (0.7 °F) at Northolt on 13 December 1981. The lowest daily maximum temperature is −8.3 °C (17.1 °F) occurring on 3 occasions: 8 January 1841, 4 January 1867 and 12 January 1987. The highest daily minimum temperature recorded is 25.8 °C (78.4 °F), recorded in Kenley on 19 July 2022. In addition to this, London holds multiple national records, including the record maximum for the months of February, April, May and June.

The city can sometimes experience extremes. Snowfall is an infrequent occurrence in winter, falling on an average of 16 days per year, though infrequently heavy. Thunderstorms are a similarly occurring feature, occurring on average up to 16 days per year. London rarely experiences tornadoes, although an F2 struck Kensal Green on 7 December 2006. Severe weather and extremes in temperature are uncommon.

London is vulnerable to climate change in the United Kingdom, and there is increasing concern among hydrological experts that London households may run out of water before 2050.

== Classifications ==
London Climate according to major climate systems
Climatic scheme	Initials	Description
Köppen system	Cfb	Oceanic climate (Note: Also called marine west coast.)
Trewartha system	Do	Temperate oceanic climate
Alisov system	—N/a	Temperate climate (Note: Mid-latitude temperate maritime climate)
Strahler system	—N/a	Marine west-coast
Thornthwaite system	C2 B'1	Moist subhumid and mesothermal
Neef system	—N/a	West side/maritime climate

== Climate data tables ==
=== London Weather Centre ===
Climate data for London Weather Centre, 2001–2009 seminormals
Month	Jan	Feb	Mar	Apr	May	Jun	Jul	Aug	Sep	Oct	Nov	Dec	Year
Mean daily maximum °C (°F)	8.5 (47.3)	8.9 (48.0)	11.7 (53.1)	15.7 (60.3)	18.5 (65.3)	22.4 (72.3)	23.6 (74.5)	23.2 (73.8)	20.8 (69.4)	16.1 (61.0)	11.9 (53.4)	8.6 (47.5)	15.8 (60.5)
Mean daily minimum °C (°F)	5.0 (41.0)	4.7 (40.5)	5.8 (42.4)	8.2 (46.8)	10.9 (51.6)	14.1 (57.4)	15.5 (59.9)	15.5 (59.9)	13.7 (56.7)	10.9 (51.6)	8.0 (46.4)	5.4 (41.7)	9.8 (49.7)
Source 1: Weather Online
Source 2: Tutiempo

=== St James's Park - Weather Station near the centre of London ===
Climate data for St James's Park WMO ID: 03770; coordinates 51°30′18″N 0°07′52″W; elevation: 5 m (16 ft); extremes 1912–present
Month	Jan	Feb	Mar	Apr	May	Jun	Jul	Aug	Sep	Oct	Nov	Dec	Year
Record high °C (°F)	16.3 (61.3)	19.7 (67.5)	24.3 (75.7)	29.1 (84.4)	31.7 (89.1)	34.6 (94.3)	40.2 (104.4)	36.1 (97.0)	32.5 (90.5)	29.1 (84.4)	20.6 (69.1)	16.9 (62.4)	40.2 (104.4)
Record low °C (°F)	−9.4 (15.1)	−10.0 (14.0)	−5.6 (21.9)	−3.3 (26.1)	−0.6 (30.9)	3.3 (37.9)	7.2 (45.0)	4.4 (39.9)	1.1 (34.0)	−3.3 (26.1)	−3.9 (25.0)	−7.0 (19.4)	−10.0 (14.0)
Source: Starlings Roost Weather

=== Kew Gardens - Weather Station in South West London on the banks of the River Thames ===
Climate data for Kew Gardens WMO ID: 99095; coordinates 51°28′55″N 0°17′40″W; elevation: 6 m (20 ft); 1991–2020 normals, extremes 1881–present
Month	Jan	Feb	Mar	Apr	May	Jun	Jul	Aug	Sep	Oct	Nov	Dec	Year
Record high °C (°F)	16.5 (61.7)	21.2 (70.2)	24.5 (76.1)	28.4 (83.1)	35.1 (95.2)	34.6 (94.3)	40.1 (104.2)	38.1 (100.6)	33.2 (91.8)	29.2 (84.6)	19.4 (66.9)	16.8 (62.2)	40.1 (104.2)
Mean daily maximum °C (°F)	8.6 (47.5)	9.2 (48.6)	11.9 (53.4)	15.1 (59.2)	18.4 (65.1)	21.4 (70.5)	23.8 (74.8)	23.4 (74.1)	20.3 (68.5)	16.0 (60.8)	11.6 (52.9)	8.9 (48.0)	15.7 (60.3)
Daily mean °C (°F)	5.3 (41.5)	5.6 (42.1)	7.7 (45.9)	10.1 (50.2)	13.3 (55.9)	16.2 (61.2)	18.5 (65.3)	18.2 (64.8)	15.4 (59.7)	11.9 (53.4)	8.0 (46.4)	5.6 (42.1)	11.3 (52.3)
Mean daily minimum °C (°F)	2.0 (35.6)	2.0 (35.6)	3.5 (38.3)	5.1 (41.2)	8.2 (46.8)	11.0 (51.8)	13.2 (55.8)	13.0 (55.4)	10.5 (50.9)	7.8 (46.0)	4.3 (39.7)	2.3 (36.1)	6.9 (44.4)
Record low °C (°F)	−12.6 (9.3)	−11.8 (10.8)	−8.3 (17.1)	−4.2 (24.4)	−1.5 (29.3)	1.5 (34.7)	5.3 (41.5)	4.3 (39.7)	−1.6 (29.1)	−5.4 (22.3)	−6.6 (20.1)	−12.0 (10.4)	−12.6 (9.3)
Average precipitation mm (inches)	59.9 (2.36)	45.4 (1.79)	39.0 (1.54)	43.6 (1.72)	44.6 (1.76)	49.7 (1.96)	45.2 (1.78)	55.1 (2.17)	51.9 (2.04)	67.9 (2.67)	66.0 (2.60)	59.2 (2.33)	627.5 (24.70)
Average precipitation days (≥ 1.0 mm)	11.8	9.9	8.9	8.6	8.3	8.5	7.6	8.4	8.4	10.9	11.3	11.2	113.8
Mean monthly sunshine hours	60.2	80.7	128.0	181.0	213.4	209.8	221.9	206.5	152.0	117.4	69.7	52.7	1,693.2
Source 1: Met Office
Source 2: Starlings Roost Weather

=== Hampstead - Weather Station in North London ===
The weather station enclosure is the most elevated of any in the London area, and as a result daytime temperatures are typically one degree lower than Heathrow, Kew, Northolt and Greenwich.

Climate data for Hampstead WMO ID: 99139; coordinates 51°33′38″N 0°10′48″W; elevation: 137 m (449 ft); 1991–2020 normals, extremes 1910–2016
Month	Jan	Feb	Mar	Apr	May	Jun	Jul	Aug	Sep	Oct	Nov	Dec	Year
Record high °C (°F)	15.7 (60.3)	18.3 (64.9)	22.8 (73.0)	27.2 (81.0)	30.0 (86.0)	33.7 (92.7)	34.4 (93.9)	37.4 (99.3)	33.9 (93.0)	28.9 (84.0)	20.0 (68.0)	15.6 (60.1)	37.4 (99.3)
Mean daily maximum °C (°F)	7.5 (45.5)	8.1 (46.6)	10.9 (51.6)	14.1 (57.4)	17.3 (63.1)	20.4 (68.7)	22.7 (72.9)	22.3 (72.1)	19.1 (66.4)	14.8 (58.6)	10.6 (51.1)	7.8 (46.0)	14.7 (58.5)
Daily mean °C (°F)	4.9 (40.8)	5.2 (41.4)	7.3 (45.1)	9.8 (49.6)	12.8 (55.0)	15.8 (60.4)	18.0 (64.4)	17.8 (64.0)	15.1 (59.2)	11.6 (52.9)	7.8 (46.0)	5.3 (41.5)	10.9 (51.6)
Mean daily minimum °C (°F)	2.3 (36.1)	2.3 (36.1)	3.7 (38.7)	5.5 (41.9)	8.3 (46.9)	11.2 (52.2)	13.3 (55.9)	13.4 (56.1)	11.1 (52.0)	8.3 (46.9)	5.0 (41.0)	2.7 (36.9)	7.3 (45.1)
Record low °C (°F)	−12.2 (10.0)	−12.8 (9.0)	−8.9 (16.0)	−5.6 (21.9)	−1.7 (28.9)	1.7 (35.1)	4.2 (39.6)	4.5 (40.1)	0.6 (33.1)	−3.3 (26.1)	−6.1 (21.0)	−8.4 (16.9)	−12.8 (9.0)
Average precipitation mm (inches)	69.5 (2.74)	51.4 (2.02)	42.8 (1.69)	49.6 (1.95)	50.5 (1.99)	58.5 (2.30)	50.5 (1.99)	67.7 (2.67)	59.1 (2.33)	78.6 (3.09)	75.7 (2.98)	68.3 (2.69)	722.1 (28.43)
Average precipitation days (≥ 1.0 mm)	12.1	10.7	9.1	9.1	8.5	8.7	8.4	9.3	9.0	11.0	11.9	11.9	119.6
Mean monthly sunshine hours	60.0	76.1	114.2	155.2	199.2	193.7	199.8	188.3	145.5	106.3	67.2	54.0	1,559.4
Source 1: Met Office
Source 2: KNMI, Starlings Roost Weather

=== Northolt - Airfield Weather Station in the North West of London ===
Temperature extremes range from 40.0 °C (104.0 °F) in July 2022, down to −16.1 °C (3.0 °F) in January 1962.

Climate data for RAF Northolt WMO ID: 03672; coordinates 51°32′55″N 0°25′01″W; elevation: 40 m (131 ft); 1991–2020 normals, extremes 1948–present
Month	Jan	Feb	Mar	Apr	May	Jun	Jul	Aug	Sep	Oct	Nov	Dec	Year
Record high °C (°F)	16.2 (61.2)	20.8 (69.4)	24.1 (75.4)	28.9 (84.0)	34.4 (93.9)	35.0 (95.0)	40.0 (104.0)	37.7 (99.9)	32.7 (90.9)	29.0 (84.2)	18.8 (65.8)	16.8 (62.2)	40.0 (104.0)
Mean daily maximum °C (°F)	8.2 (46.8)	8.8 (47.8)	11.6 (52.9)	14.8 (58.6)	18.1 (64.6)	21.2 (70.2)	23.5 (74.3)	23.1 (73.6)	20.0 (68.0)	15.6 (60.1)	11.3 (52.3)	8.6 (47.5)	15.4 (59.7)
Daily mean °C (°F)	5.1 (41.2)	5.4 (41.7)	7.6 (45.7)	10.0 (50.0)	13.2 (55.8)	16.2 (61.2)	18.4 (65.1)	18.1 (64.6)	15.3 (59.5)	11.8 (53.2)	7.9 (46.2)	5.5 (41.9)	11.2 (52.2)
Mean daily minimum °C (°F)	2.0 (35.6)	2.0 (35.6)	3.5 (38.3)	5.2 (41.4)	8.3 (46.9)	11.3 (52.3)	13.4 (56.1)	13.2 (55.8)	10.6 (51.1)	7.9 (46.2)	4.5 (40.1)	2.3 (36.1)	7.0 (44.6)
Record low °C (°F)	−16.1 (3.0)	−13.9 (7.0)	−8.0 (17.6)	−4.7 (23.5)	−2.7 (27.1)	0.0 (32.0)	4.4 (39.9)	3.0 (37.4)	0.0 (32.0)	−5.5 (22.1)	−7.5 (18.5)	−17.4 (0.7)	−17.4 (0.7)
Average precipitation mm (inches)	62.9 (2.48)	49.1 (1.93)	42.4 (1.67)	45.6 (1.80)	51.8 (2.04)	50.2 (1.98)	48.6 (1.91)	56.6 (2.23)	51.4 (2.02)	70.2 (2.76)	71.4 (2.81)	63.1 (2.48)	663.3 (26.11)
Average precipitation days (≥ 1.0 mm)	11.6	10.1	9.1	9.4	8.6	8.6	8.1	9.4	8.5	10.7	11.6	11.3	117.0
Source 1: Met Office
Source 2: Starlings Roost Weather

=== Greenwich - Weather Station in South East London near the river Thames ===
Climate data for Greenwich Park, elevation: 47 m (154 ft), 1991–2020 normals, extremes 1948–2004
Month	Jan	Feb	Mar	Apr	May	Jun	Jul	Aug	Sep	Oct	Nov	Dec	Year
Record high °C (°F)	16.8 (62.2)	19.7 (67.5)	23.3 (73.9)	25.3 (77.5)	29.0 (84.2)	34.5 (94.1)	35.3 (95.5)	37.5 (99.5)	30.2 (86.4)	26.1 (79.0)	18.9 (66.0)	16.4 (61.5)	37.5 (99.5)
Mean daily maximum °C (°F)	8.5 (47.3)	9.2 (48.6)	12.1 (53.8)	15.4 (59.7)	18.6 (65.5)	21.4 (70.5)	23.8 (74.8)	23.3 (73.9)	20.3 (68.5)	15.8 (60.4)	11.6 (52.9)	8.9 (48.0)	15.8 (60.4)
Daily mean °C (°F)	5.9 (42.6)	6.2 (43.2)	8.4 (47.1)	10.7 (51.3)	13.8 (56.8)	16.7 (62.1)	18.8 (65.8)	18.7 (65.7)	15.9 (60.6)	12.4 (54.3)	8.8 (47.8)	6.3 (43.3)	11.9 (53.4)
Mean daily minimum °C (°F)	3.4 (38.1)	3.2 (37.8)	4.7 (40.5)	6.0 (42.8)	9.1 (48.4)	12.0 (53.6)	13.9 (57.0)	14.1 (57.4)	11.6 (52.9)	9.0 (48.2)	6.1 (43.0)	3.8 (38.8)	8.1 (46.6)
Record low °C (°F)	−12.7 (9.1)	−9.4 (15.1)	−6.7 (19.9)	−4.8 (23.4)	−1.0 (30.2)	1.1 (34.0)	5.0 (41.0)	5.3 (41.5)	1.1 (34.0)	−2.1 (28.2)	−8.0 (17.6)	−10.5 (13.1)	−12.7 (9.1)
Average precipitation mm (inches)	43.9 (1.73)	39.9 (1.57)	36.5 (1.44)	38.6 (1.52)	44.0 (1.73)	49.3 (1.94)	36.3 (1.43)	53.0 (2.09)	52.4 (2.06)	58.3 (2.30)	59.9 (2.36)	50.7 (2.00)	562.9 (22.16)
Average precipitation days (≥ 1.0 mm)	10.5	9.2	7.9	8.1	7.9	7.8	7.1	8.2	7.9	10.3	10.6	10.2	105.6
Mean monthly sunshine hours	44.4	66.1	109.7	152.9	198.7	198.6	209.2	198.0	140.6	99.7	58.5	50.1	1,526.4
Source 1: Met Office
Source 2: Starlings Roost Weather

=== Gatwick ===
Climate data for London-Gatwick (1961–1990)
Month	Jan	Feb	Mar	Apr	May	Jun	Jul	Aug	Sep	Oct	Nov	Dec	Year
Daily mean °C (°F)	3.5 (38.3)	3.8 (38.8)	5.7 (42.3)	8.0 (46.4)	11.3 (52.3)	14.4 (57.9)	16.5 (61.7)	16.1 (61.0)	13.8 (56.8)	10.7 (51.3)	6.4 (43.5)	4.5 (40.1)	9.6 (49.3)
Average precipitation mm (inches)	78 (3.1)	51 (2.0)	61 (2.4)	54 (2.1)	55 (2.2)	57 (2.2)	45 (1.8)	56 (2.2)	68 (2.7)	73 (2.9)	77 (3.0)	79 (3.1)	754 (29.7)
Mean monthly sunshine hours	52.4	71.3	113.4	153.0	204.3	204.3	204.5	195.3	148.1	110.5	69.3	47.8	1,574.2
Source: NOAA

=== Average UV index ===
Ultraviolet index
Jan	Feb	Mar	Apr	May	Jun	Jul	Aug	Sep	Oct	Nov	Dec	Year
1	1	2	4	5	6	6	5	4	2	1	0	3.4

== See also ==
- River Thames frost fairs
- Climate of the United Kingdom
