= Occupant-centric building controls =

Building energy management system

Occupant-centric building controls or Occupant-centric controls (OCC) is a control strategy for the indoor environment, that specifically focuses on meeting the current needs of building occupants while decreasing building energy consumption. OCC can be used to control lighting and appliances, but is most commonly used to control heating, ventilation, and air conditioning (HVAC). OCC use real-time data collected on indoor environmental conditions, occupant presence and occupant preferences as inputs to energy system control strategies. By responding to real-time inputs, OCC is able to flexibly provide the proper level of energy services, such as heating and cooling, when and where it is needed by occupants. Ensuring that building energy services are provided in the right quantity is intended to improve occupant comfort while providing these services only at the right time and in the right location is intended to reduce overall energy use.

In contrast to OCC, conventional building control strategies, known as Building Energy Management Systems (BEMS), typically use predetermined temperature setpoints and setback schedules. These temperatures and temperature schedules are often determined by industry standards with no input from the building occupants. Conventional BEMS typically have static operation parameters that give minimal flexibility to meet the changing needs of building occupants throughout the day, the changing needs of new building tenants, or the diverse thermal needs of any given group of building occupants.

The American Society for Heating, Refrigeration and Air-conditioning Engineers has outlined that thermal comfort of occupants is influenced both by environmental conditions such as radiative heat, humidity, air speed and season as well as personal factors such as physiology, clothing worn and activity level. This dynamic and personalized nature of thermal comfort has traditionally made it complex it integrate into HVAC controls but an increase in sensing and computing capabilities along with a decrease in sensing and computing costs has made it possible for OCC to be an effective and scalable means of controlling building energy systems. With buildings consuming over 33% of global energy, and producing almost 40% of CO_{2} emissions, OCC could play a significant role in reducing global energy consumption and CO_{2} emissions.

== Background ==
=== Occupant-Centric Control Inputs ===
OCC relies on real-time occupancy and occupant preference data as inputs to the control algorithm. This data must be continually collected by various methods and can be collected on various scales including whole-building, floor, room, and sub-room. Often, it is most useful to collect data on a scale that matches the thermal zoning of the building. A thermal zone is a section of a building that is all conditioned under the same temperature setpoint.

Data on occupant presence (occupied or unoccupied) and occupancy levels (number of occupants) can be collected with either explicit or implicit sensors. Explicit sensors directly measure occupancy and can include passive infrared sensors, ultrasonic motion detectors, and entranceway counting cameras. Implicit sensors measure a parameter that can be correlated to occupancy through some calibrated relationship. Examples of implicit occupancy sensors includes CO_{2} sensors and Wi-Fi-connected device count. The selection of occupancy sensing devices depends on the size of the space being monitored, the budget for sensors, the desired accuracy, the goal of the sensor (detecting occupant presence or count), and security considerations.

Unlike occupant presence data, acquiring occupant preference data requires direct feedback from building occupants. This feedback can be solicited or unsolicited. Unsolicited occupant preference data can include the time and magnitude of a manual thermostat setpoint change. While this can be a good indicator of occupant thermal dissatisfaction, thermostat setpoint changes can be infrequent creating a barrier to integrating occupant preference into OCC. Solicited occupant preference information is often used as a means of acquiring more occupant preference information and takes the form of just-in-time surveys or Ecological Momentary Assessments (EMA). These surveys, typically deployed to computers, smart phones, or smart watches, can ask participants about their thermal sensation, thermal satisfaction or any other factor that reflects their comfort in the space. Implementing occupant preference information into OCC is still in its early stages and its practical application is still being studied in the academic environment.

=== Predictive Controls ===
OCC can be categorized as either reactive control or predictive control. Reactive control uses the real-time occupant preference and presents feedback to immediately alter the conditions of the space. While this approach is useful for controlling systems with fast response times such as lighting systems, reactive OCC is not ideal for systems with slow response times such as HVAC. For these slow response systems, predictive control allows building services, such as heating, to be provided at the right time without a lag between the time a service is needed and the time when the service is provided.

Unlike reactive controls, predictive controls use real-time occupant preference and presence data to inform and train predictive control algorithms rather than directly impact the system operation. Predictive controls have a 'prediction horizon' which is the amount of time ahead that an OCC will need to change a setpoint or ventilation rate to achieve a certain temperature or indoor air quality level. The needed prediction horizon for an OCC will vary depending on the response time of the building. Building attributes that contribute to the need for a longer prediction horizon when controlling HVAC systems include large open rooms, high thermal mass, and spaces with rapid changes in occupancy levels.

For commercial HVAC OCC, predictive algorithms will be informed by the six information grades (IGs) outlined by ASHRAE. These IGs are occupant presence, occupant count, and occupant preference, each considered at the building and thermal zone level. From occupant presence data, an OCC may predict the earliest occupant arrival time and latest departure time. From occupant count, an OCC may predict the maximum expected number of building occupants and when. From occupant preference data, an OCC may predict the desired temperature and humidity of the space throughout the day. With this information, an OCC could predict when it would need to change temperature setpoints and ventilation rates to achieve a desired temperature, and air quality level at a specific time. Predictive algorithms needs a sufficient amount of data as well as relatively regular occupant preference and presence patterns to develop accurate control predictions.

=== Occupant-Centric Control Development ===
The development of OCC is currently being supported by the International Energy Agency (IEA) Energy in Buildings and Community (EBC) Annex 79. Annex 79, which will run from 2018 to 2023, is an international collaborative initiative focused on developing and deploying technology, data collection methods, simulation methods, control algorithms, implementation policies, and application strategies aimed at occupant-centric building design and controls. This collaborative is focused on applying the knowledge gained from the previous Annex 66 which ran from 2013 to 2018. Annex 66 worked to understand how occupant behavior relates to building energy consumption as well as how building operation and design influence occupant thermal comfort. This was done primarily by collecting occupant behavior data and developing occupant simulation methods.

Additional groups working to develop OCC include the ASHRAE Multidisciplinary Task Group on Occupant Behavior in Buildings (MGT.OBB), and the National Science Foundation Future of Work Center for Intelligent Environments.

=== Occupant-Centric Control Algorithms ===
OCC is still in development where the creation and evaluation of various control algorithms are the main focus of study. Algorithms that have been studied for OCC include, but are not limited to, iterative data fusion methods, unsupervised machine learning, and reinforcement learning. Each of these algorithms has varying levels of computational complexity, needed inputs, and energy reduction potential.

Iterative data fusion methods are an example of reactive OCC controls and are a means of combining data from two or more sources. For this method, preference data from multiple occupants and data on indoor environmental conditions is used to balance the two optimization goals of average occupant satisfaction and energy savings. To balance these goals, each time new data is put into the system, the algorithm will determine if any control action is needed, such as changing the temperature setpoint, based on a set of control rules that determine how well the optimization goals are being met

Unsupervised machine learning can be used to cluster occupants based on their 'thermal personalities'. These clusters can then be used to inform reactive or predictive controls by understanding the thermal preferences of the specific occupants in the space. For this method, solicited occupant preference information is fed into an unsupervised machine algorithm that will group occupants based on how similar their thermal preferences are. The number and size of the groups depends on the type of unsupervised algorithm used as well as the data being analyzed.

Reinforcement machine learning can be used as a predictive control algorithm with the goal of optimizing occupant satisfaction and energy savings. For this method, the algorithm accepts occupant presence and preference data and uses it to learn occupant preferences without the need to train the algorithm on previous data. The algorithm will evaluate each control decision it makes in order to maximize its reward which is based on its ability to optimize occupant satisfaction and energy savings. This algorithm is capable of making continual adjustments based on new information it receives.
