= Exterior insulation finishing system =

Non-load bearing building cladding

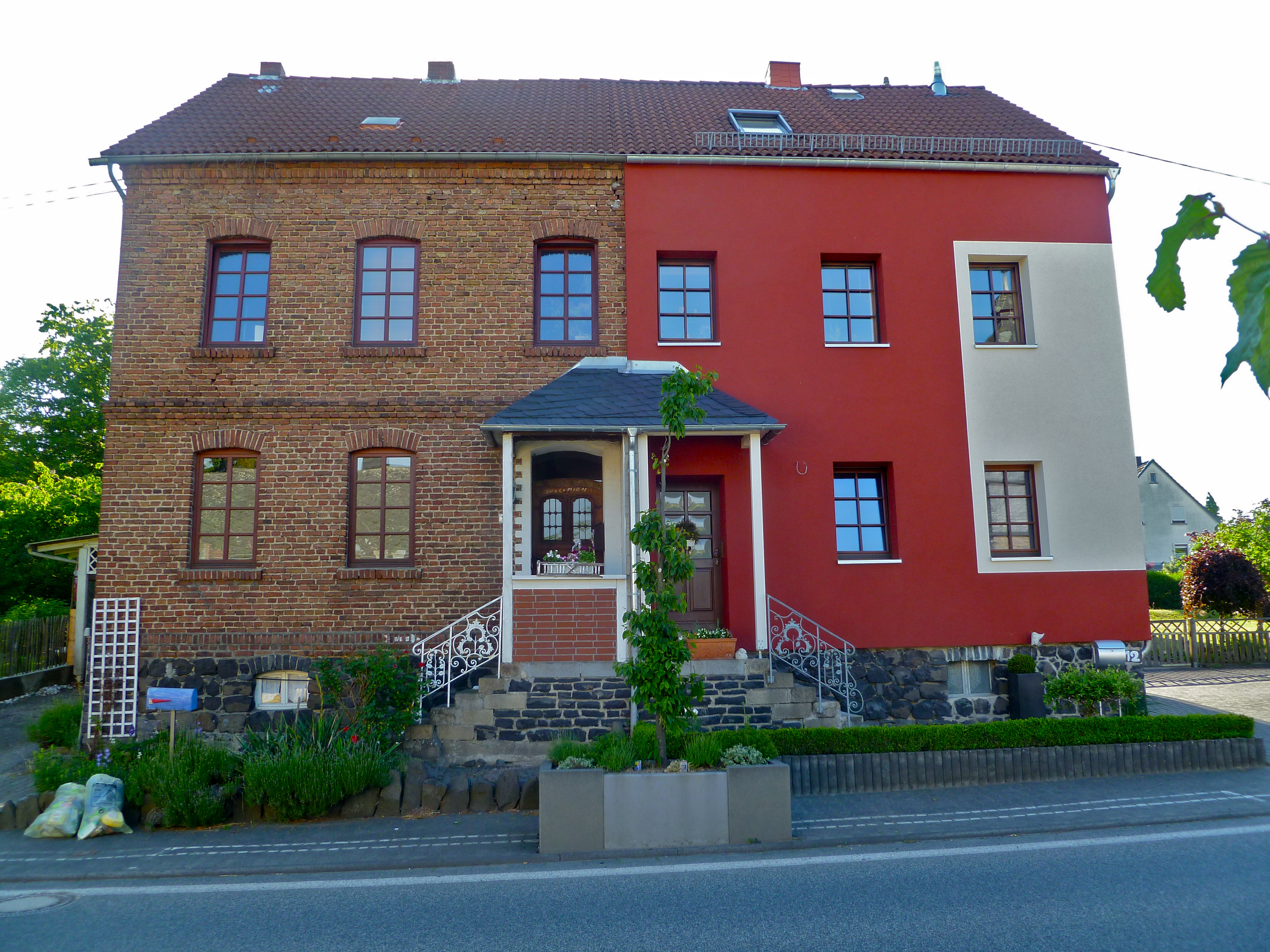
A historic brick building in Germany covered with EIFS on the right side.

Exterior insulation and finish system (EIFS) is a general class of non-load bearing building cladding systems that provides exterior walls with an insulated, water-resistant, finished surface in an integrated composite material system.

EIFS has been in use since the 1960s in North America and was first used on masonry buildings. Since the 1990s, the majority of wood-framed buildings have used EIFS.

== History of EIFS ==
EIFS was developed in Europe after World War II and was initially used to retrofit masonry walls. EIFS started to be used in North America in the 1960s, at first on commercial masonry buildings. EIFS became popular in the mid-1970s due to the oil embargo and the resultant surge in interest in insulating wall systems that conserve energy used for heating and cooling.

In the late 1980s problems started developing due to water leakage in EIFS-clad buildings. This led to international controversy and lawsuits. EIFS installation was found to be a contributing factor in the multibillion-dollar problem known as the "Leaky condo crisis" in southwestern British Columbia and the "Leaky homes" issue in New Zealand that emerged separately in the 1980s and 1990s.

Critics argue that, while not inherently more prone to water penetration than other exterior finishes, barrier-type EIFS systems (non-water-managed systems) do not allow water that does penetrate the building to escape. The EIFS industry has consistently maintained that poor craftsmanship and bad architectural detailing at the perimeter of the EIFS was the problem. As a result, building codes began mandating a drainage system for EIFS systems on wood-frame buildings and additional on-site inspection.

Though there are some cases where insurance companies may not offer coverage for EIFS, several companies do. EIFS systems installed at lower building levels are subject to vandalism, as the material is soft and can be chipped or carved resulting in significant damage. In these cases, heavier ounce reinforcing mesh can drastically increase the durability of the EIFS system.

EIFS is now used all over North America, and in other areas around the world, especially in Europe and the Pacific Rim. The use of EIFS over stud-and-sheathing framing instead of over solid walls is a technique used primarily in North America. As of 1997 EIFS accounted for about 4% of the residential siding market and 12% of the commercial siding market.

== Terminology ==
In the United States, the International Building Code and ASTM International define Exterior Insulation and Finish System (EIFS) as a non-load-bearing exterior wall cladding system that consists of an insulation board attached either adhesively, mechanically, or both, to the substrate; an integrally reinforced base coat; and a textured protective finish coat.

The predominant method of EIFS applied today is EIFS with Drainage, which provides a way for moisture accumulated in the wall cavity to evacuate.

EIFS is not stucco despite often called "synthetic stucco". Traditional stucco is a 20 -40 mm centuries-old, hard, dense, thick, non-insulating material which consists of aggregate, a binder, and water. EIFS is a lightweight synthetic wall cladding that includes foam plastic insulation and thin synthetic coatings. There are also specialty stuccos that use synthetic materials but no insulation, and these are also not EIFS. A common example is one-coat stucco, which is a thick, synthetic stucco applied in a single layer (traditional stucco is applied in 3 layers).

EIFS are proprietary systems of a particular EIFS manufacturer and consist of specific components. EIFS are not generic products made from common separate materials. The materials and installation methods specified by different EIFS manufacturers are not all compatible and should not be used interchangeably in new construction or repair work.

The technical definition of an EIFS does not include wall framing, sheathing, flashings, caulking, water barriers, windows, doors, and other wall components. However, some architects have begun specifying flashings, sealants, and wiring fasteners as being a part of the EIFS scope of work. Many of the EIFS manufacturers have their own standard details showing typical building conditions for window and door flashings, control joints, inside/outside corners, penetrations, and joints at dissimilar materials which should be followed for that manufacturer's warranty.

== EIFS installation ==
EIFS are typically attached to the outside face of exterior walls with an adhesive (cementitious or acrylic based) or mechanical fasteners. Adhesives are commonly used to attach EIFS to gypsum board, cement board, or concrete substrates. EIFS are attached with mechanical fasteners (specially designed for this application) when installed over house wraps (sheet-good weather barriers) such as are commonly used over wood sheathings.

== EIFS since year 2000 ==
Research, conducted by the Oak Ridge National Laboratory and supported by the Department of Energy, has affirmed that EIFS are the "best performing cladding" in relation to thermal and moisture control when compared to brick, stucco, and cementitious fiberboard siding. EIFS are in compliance with modern building codes that emphasize energy conservation through the use of CI (continuous insulation) and a continuous air barrier.

EIFS before 2000 were barrier systems, meaning that the EIFS itself was the weather barrier. After 2000, the EIFS industry introduced the air/moisture barrier that resides behind the foam. In a study done by the Department Of Energy's Office of Science - Oak Ridge National Laboratory, it was found that the best air/moisture barrier was a fluid barrier. The Oak Ridge National Laboratory, ATLANTA, Oct. 28, 2006 — EIFS "outperformed all other walls in terms of moisture while maintaining superior thermal performance." The National Institute of Standards and Technology (NIST) has evaluated the five life cycle stages of the environmental impact of EIFS alongside brick, aluminum, stucco, vinyl, and cedar. Depending on a variety of site and project specific conditions, EIFS have the potential to save money in construction costs and contribute toward energy efficient operations and environmental responsibility when correctly designed and executed.

Some types of EIFS have passed some fire tests that range from resistance to ignitability, that include: ASTM E 119, NFPA 268, NFPA 285. However, some types and thicknesses of EIFS have been involved in large uncontrolled exterior building fires, such as the 2008 Monte Carlo Hotel Casino fire.

== Composition & types of EIFS ==
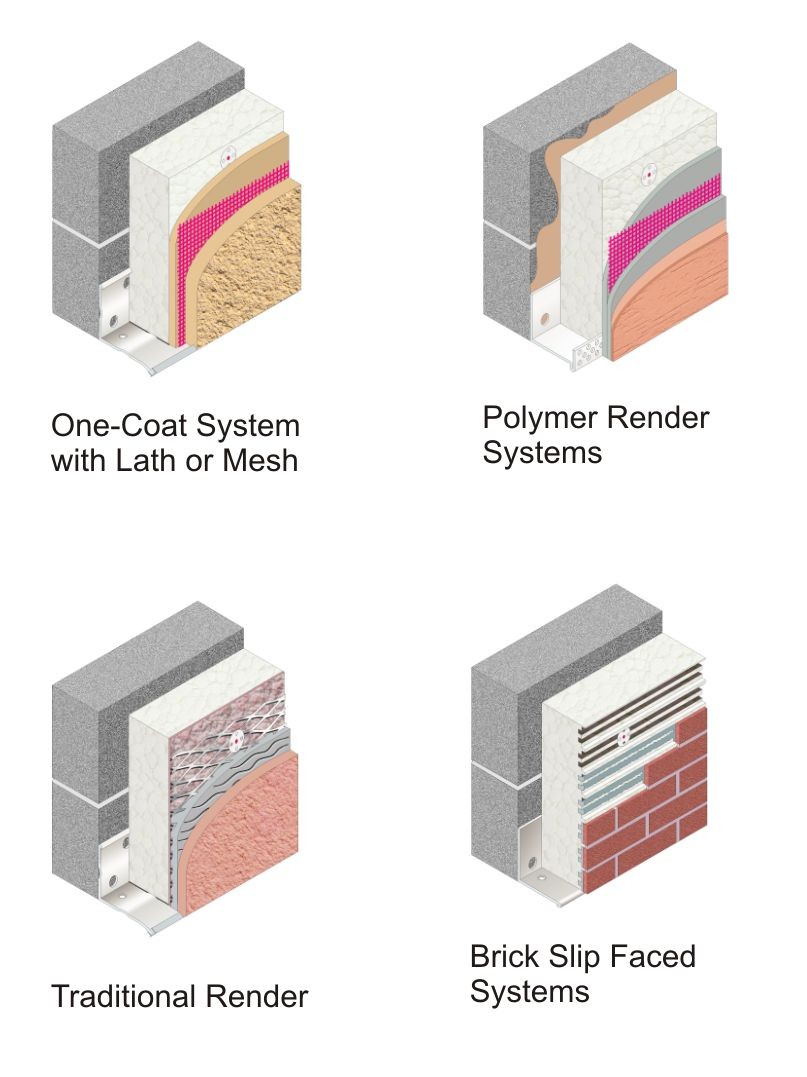
Types of External Wall Insulation Systems (EWIS)

Types of EIFS are defined by their materials and the existence/absence of a drainage plane. The EIFS Industry Members Association (EIMA) defines two classes of EIFS: Class PB (polymer based) identified as PB EIFS, and Class PM (polymer modified) identified as PM EIFS.

PB EIFS is the most common type in North America. It uses expanded polystyrene (EPS) insulation adhered to the wall substrate. Fiberglass reinforcing mesh is applied to the exterior face of the EPS, embedded in a nominal 1/16 inch (1.6 mm) base coat. This assembly can receive additional layers of mesh for stronger impact resistance. Other types of insulation board can include polyisocyanurate.

PM EIFS use extruded polystyrene insulation (XEPS) adhered to the wall substrate. Fiberglass reinforcing mesh is mechanically attached to the exterior face of the XEPS and covered with a thick, cementitious base coat and a finish coats as desired. The system has joints similar to traditional stucco. PM EIFS have evolved to include different insulation materials and base coats.

The most common type of EIFS used today is the system that includes a drainage cavity, which allows any and all moisture to exit the wall. EIFS with drainage typically consists of the following components:

- An optional water-resistive barrier (WRB) that covers the substrate.
- A drainage plane between the WRB and the insulation board that is most commonly achieved with vertical ribbons of adhesive applied over the WRB.
- Insulation board typically made of expanded polystyrene (EPS) which is secured with an adhesive or mechanically to the substrate.
- Glass-fiber reinforcing mesh embedded in the base coat
- A water-resistant base coat that is applied on top of the insulation to serve as a weather barrier.
- A finish coat that typically uses colorfast and crack-resistant acrylic co-polymer technology.

If an EIFS with Drainage, or water-managed EIFS is installed, a water resistive barrier (aka a WRB) is first installed over the substrate (generally glass faced exterior-grade gypsum sheathing, oriented strand board (OSB) or plywood). The moisture barrier is applied to the entire wall surface with a mesh tape over joints and a liquid-applied membrane or a protective wrap like tyvek or felt paper. Then a drainage cavity is created and the other 3 layers, described above, are added. This type of EIFS is required by many building codes areas on wood-frame construction and is intended to provide a path for incidental water that may get behind the EIFS with a safe route back to the outside. The purpose is to preclude water from damaging the supporting wall.

Adhesives and finishes are water-based, and thus must be installed at temperatures well above freezing. Two types of adhesives used contain Portland cement ("cementitious"), or do not have any Portland cement ("cementless"). Adhesives that contain Portland cement harden by the chemical reaction of the cement with water. Adhesives and finishes that are cementless harden by the evaporation of water. Adhesives come in two forms: The most common is in a plastic pail as a paste, to which Portland cement is added and as dry powders in sacks, to which water is added. Finishes come in a plastic pail, ready to use, like paint. EIFS insulation comes in individual pieces, usually 2' x 4', in large bags. The pieces are trimmed to fit the wall at the construction site.

== Legal issues ==
EIFS systems have been the subject of several lawsuits in the United States, mostly related to the installation process and failure of the system causing moisture buildups and subsequent mold growth. The most notable case concerned the former San Martin, California courthouse. This case was settled for $12 million.

The basic underlying problem behind EIFS litigation was that EIFS was marketed as a cost-effective replacement for stucco. Stucco is expensive to install because it must be carefully applied by skilled craftsmen. General contractors switched to EIFS because they were supposed to be easy to install with unskilled or semi-skilled labor and would not crack like traditional stucco. Although EIFS if properly installed according to the manufacturer's directions should not have water intrusion problems, many installers cut corners by using insufficiently trained labor and also failed to supervise their work adequately. In turn, thousands of EIFS installations were noncompliant and suffered severe water intrusion and mold as a result. While the EIFS industry has consistently tried to shift the blame to installing contractors, the construction industry has retorted that using journeymen carpenters in turn eliminates the cost advantage of EIFS over stucco, and that the EIFS industry should have anticipated this issue and engineered its products from the beginning to be installed by unskilled labor or semi-skilled labor (that is, it should have been a fault-tolerant design).

== Marketing of EIFS & the EIFS industry ==
EIFS account for about 10% of the US commercial wall cladding market. There are several dozen EIFS manufacturers in North America. Some sell nationwide, and some are regional in their area of business operations. The top five EIFS producers account for about 90% of the US market. These producers include Dryvit Systems, STO Corp., Sika (including Senergy, Parex and LaHabra brands), and Master Wall.

== EIFS architectural details ==
EIFS offer the option of adding architectural details that are composed of the same materials. These mouldings come in a variety of shapes and sizes. They are widely used on residential and commercial projects in North America and are gaining popularity worldwide.
