= Kansas Building Science Institute =

Vocational school in Manhattan, Kansas

Coordinates: 39°10′28″N 96°32′34″W

The Kansas Building Science Institute is a vocational school located in Manhattan, Kansas. The Institute conducts week-long Home Energy Rater Trainings (HERS) as well as Building Performance Index (BPI) and Weatherization (WX) Trainings, among others.

== Training center ==
The Institute conducts trainings in a 3,000-square-foot (280 m^{2}) multi-purpose classroom and training center in Manhattan. The campus also includes a furnace lab, a mobile home for Weatherization Trainings, and an attached house to perform test ratings and inspections on. Other houses around Manhattan are also used for this purpose.
