= Building information modeling in green building =

Building information modeling (BIM) in green buildings aims at enabling sustainable designs and in turn allows architects and engineers to integrate and analyze building performance. It quantifies the environmental impacts of systems and materials to support the decisions needed to produce sustainable buildings, using information about sustainable materials that are stored in the database and interoperability between design and analysis tools. Such data can be useful for building life cycle assessments.

== Services ==
BIM services, including conceptual modeling and topographic modeling, offer an approach to green building.

=== Conceptual energy analysis ===
Conceptual energy analysis allows designers and BIM service providers to transfer conceptual modeling into analytical energy models through exporting mass to gbXML. Possible information that can be transferred includes climate data, graphical energy analysis results, and design contrast options.

=== Solar and shadow analysis ===
Software tools can aid designers and BIM service providers in envisaging or quantifying solar and shadow effects.

=== Sustainability analysis ===
BIM tools and workflow have two phases: inherent BIM features and BIM-based analysis tools.

Inherent BIM features include functions such as 3D Model, visualization clash, and detection, which help integrated project delivery and design optimization.

BIM-based analysis tools are used to analyze energy, solar, thermal, etc. The benefits of those tools are to enable better communication and cooperation, as well as higher accuracy and efficiency.

The following tabulation compares BIM-based software used for green analyses.

BIM-based software used for green analyses
BIM software	Green analyses E CE NV SD A W						Users	Users
AECOsim	v	v		v			E/C/D	De
Autodesk Green Building Studio	v	v	v	v		v	A/D	De/OM
Bentley Hevacomp	v	v	v				D/E/C	De
DesignBuilder Simulation	v	v	v	v			C/E/A	De
DOE2	v		v	v			A/E/C/U/G	De
EnergyPlus	v	v		v		v	E/A	De
eQUEST	v		v	v			A/E/C	De/C/OM
FloVENT			v				E	De
HEED	v	v					O/A/D/C	De
Integrated Environmental Solutions Virtual Environment	v	v	v	v		v	A/D/E/O	De
ODEON Room Acoustics Software					v		A/E	De
TRNSYS	v		v	v			A/E	De
E for energy, CE for carbon emissions, NV for natural ventilation, SD for solar and daylight, A for acoustic, W for water A for architects, D for a designer, E for engineers, O for consultants, U for utility companies, G for the government. De for design, C for construction, OM for operation and maintenance.

=== Industry Foundation Classes data model ===
Industry Foundation Classes (IFC) or COBie is a standard exchange protocol to be used in data exchange between BIM software and rating systems.

== Construction ==
BIM aids in four main areas— land, water, energy and materials.

=== Land ===
BIM and GIS are integrated for site planning. BIM simulations can estimate the progress of construction.

=== Water ===
BIM is utilized in large scale schemes as well as across the industry. It helps decrease unnecessary loss and effectively saves water. BIM improves the design process of building water supply and drainage.

=== Energy ===
BIM can be used to simulate energy consumption. It integrates and analyzes information at the construction stage to calculate the thermal environment that could shorten the construction period.

=== Material ===
BIM tracks material consumption, calculates material requirements, and manages material information uniformly.

== Rating systems ==
Sustainable rating systems are used to evaluate the environmental performance of buildings. These systems have common criteria and are similar in their evaluation of energy consumption, indoor environmental quality, water efficiency, and material. Three rating systems that can integrate with BIM are LEED, BREEAM, and Green Star.

The framework of integrating BIM-based with sustainable rating systems includes "design assistance" and "certification management" modules. The design assistance module assists designers with efficient and sustainable knowledge that is built into the BIM tool to ensure the design-oriented through BIM tool's application programming interface (API). The certification management module is a web-based application used to manage project information, sustainable documentation and submissions for certification purposes.

== See also ==
- List of BIM software
