= Xeokit =

Open-source 3D Web Graphics SDK

xeokit

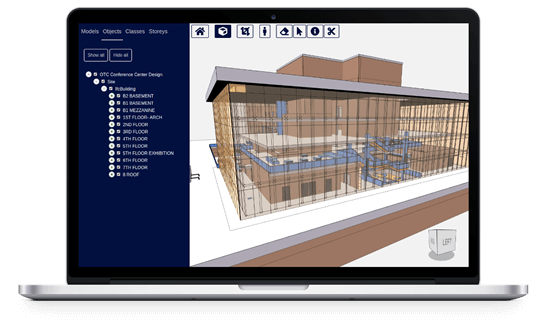
- Bundled sample xeokit BIM Viewer
- Original author: Lindsay Kay.
- Developers: Creoox AG, Lindsay Kay
- Release: 21 January 2019; 7 years ago
- Stable release: v2.6.91 / October 6, 2025; 12 months ago
- Written in: JavaScript
- Engine: WebGL
- Operating system: Cross-platform
- Predecessor: xeogl, SceneJS
- Type: 3D Web Graphics SDK, BIM, CAD, Web3D, Computer Graphics
- License: AGPL-3.0 or proprietary
- Website: xeokit.io
- Repository: xeokit-sdk on GitHub

xeokit SDK is an open-source JavaScript software development kit (SDK) for rendering 3D graphics in web browsers with focus on 3D Building Information Models (BIM). Developed by Creoox AG and originally authored by Lindsay Kay, the software was released in 2019 as a successor to earlier projects such as SceneJS and xeogl.

xeokit is a standard open-source library for having a BIM viewer without a vendor lock-in. It is designed to support the visualization of large-scale BIM models and has been referenced in academic publications, technical books, and professional use cases related to digital twins, smart buildings, and infrastructure monitoring. It has been featured in presentations at events organized by the Khronos Group and OSArch and has been used in prototypes recognized at international AEC Hackathons.

== History ==
xeokit SDK was created as a successor to earlier WebGL-based 3D visualization libraries developed by Lindsay Kay, also known as Xeolabs. The lineage of the SDK begins with SceneJS, a general-purpose 3D engine initially launched as a research project. SceneJS offered features such as support for OBJ and Collada models and level of detail (LOD) rendering. It included an interactive "playroom" on its website, allowing users to modify examples in real time. The library was noted for its optimized core and steady development. SceneJS existed already around the time of the official WebGL release in 2011.

Following SceneJS, Kay developed xeogl, a WebGL library focused on real-time 3D rendering of large number of elements in the browser. The focus of the project shifted more clearly towards CAD, BIM and the AEC industry in general.

Building on the experience from these earlier projects, xeokit SDK was introduced in 2019 with a dedicated focus on high-performance, rendering large 3D (BIM) models in the browser with double precision. Additional background on the development of SceneJS, xeogl, and the xeokit SDK is discussed by Lindsay Kay in a Tech Talk presented at the AEC Hackathon Wrocław Edition 2024.

== Presentations and appearances ==
xeokit SDK was presented by its creator, Lindsay Kay, at the Virtual WebGL Meetup in 2020, an industry event hosted by the Khronos Group that also featured speakers from organizations such as Google, Sketchfab, and Microsoft. Another early public presentation was given during the OSArch Monthly Meetup in July 2021, where xeokit was introduced as a toolkit for AEC graphics applications in the browser.

In addition to industry meetups, xeokit SDK has been featured in AEC-focused hackathons. At the 2024 and 2025 AEC Hackathons in Zurich, xeokit was presented during a series of TechTalks and is listed on the independent platform opensource.construction as a "graduated" open-source project. In 2024, during the AEC Hackathon in Wrocław, xeokit SDK was presented by its creator, Lindsay Kay, and was used by several participating teams. One of the projects, developed by the team IFC Data Miners, was awarded the top prize for "Best Overall Project." The prototype application utilized artificial intelligence and a natural-language user interface to enhance BIM model navigation using xeokit SDK.

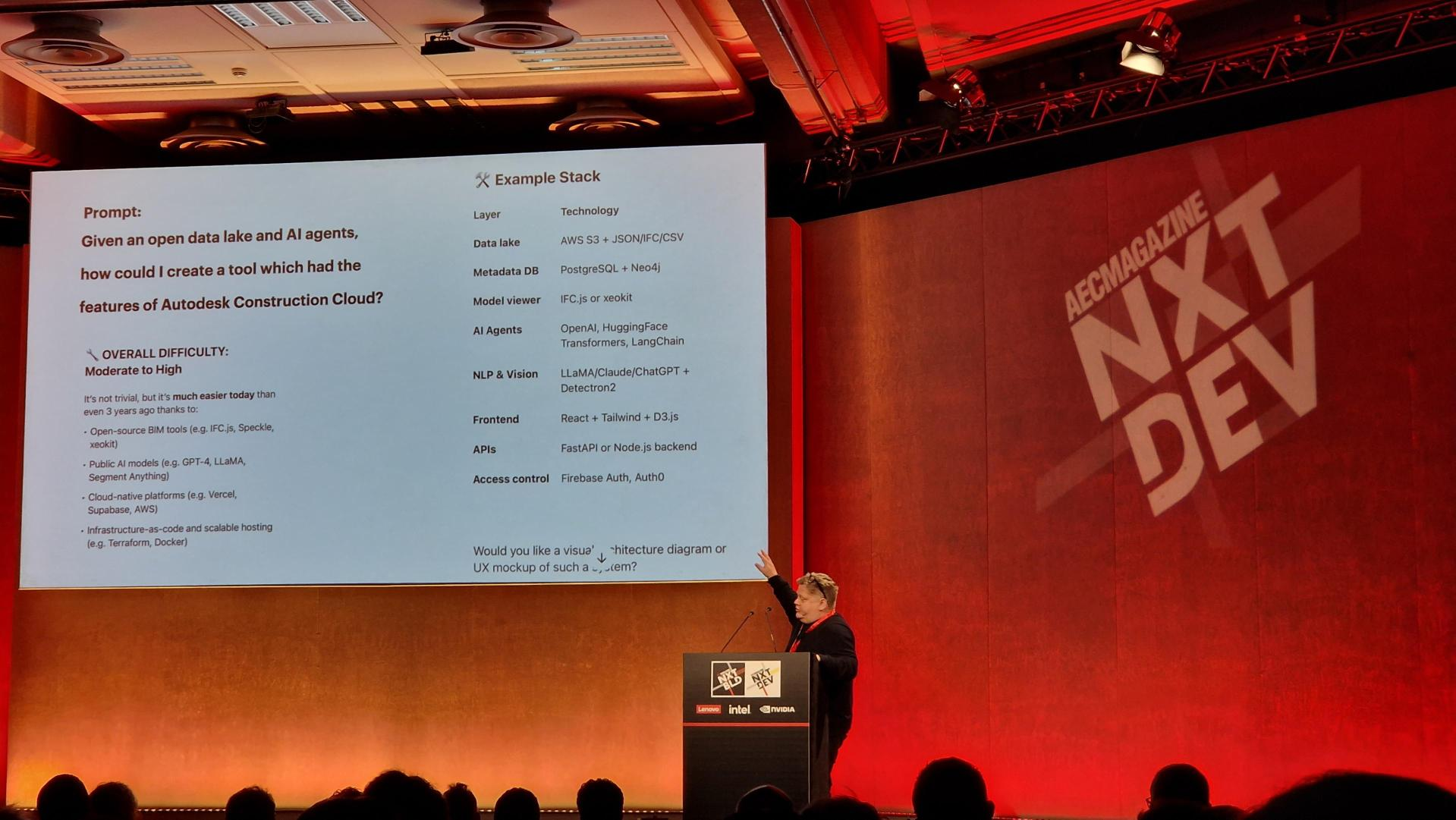
"Kill BIM" presentation at NXT DEV 2025

At NXT DEV 2025, Martyn Day, AEC Magazine's co-founder and consulting editor, gave a presentation titled "Kill BIM" that explored possible future scenarios for the AEC industry, including to explore the use of open data lakes, AI agents and open source tools to build tailored software solutions. His presentation included a suggested technology stack from ChatGPT featuring xeokit as the model viewer.

== Applications and adoption ==
xeokit SDK has been publicly adopted in several commercial and open-source web-based platforms for BIM visualization. For instance, OpenProject, an open-source project management software, integrated xeokit in its IFC model viewer to support digital construction workflows. Other examples include Campo, Fonn, bimspot, CMDBuild

xeokit SDK enables the visualization of 3D BIM models in standard web browsers without requiring proprietary software, facilitating vendor-neutral workflows helping avoid vendor lock-in. Typical application domains include Common Data Environments (CDEs), digital twin platforms, IoT-integrated systems for smart buildings, facility management, Building Management Systems, and Asset management platform in the built environment.

The SDK has been applied in digital twin systems to visualize 3D BIM models alongside Unity and CesiumJS with integration of live data sources and GIS data, in particular also for large infrastructure objects like bridges. Other GIS-related applications include the use of the xeokit SDK as the integrated BIM viewer within Masterportal, the open-source geoportal, as well as within DIPAS, the digital system for citizen participation. A related implementation demonstrated within the Connected Urban Twins project includes a BIM-based coordination platform for major events and automated BIM modelling based on data from Hamburg’s geospatial digital twin.

== Features ==
The xeokit SDK offers features for developing interactive BIM visualization applications in web environments:

- Support for multiple 3D formats and model federation, including IFC (via conversion to XKT), BCF, glTF, GLB, OBJ, STL, 3DXML, dotBIM (.bim), CityJSON, and LAS/LAZ (point clouds).
- XKT binary format, optimized for fast loading and low memory usage while preserving geometry and IFC metadata. In one documented case, an IFCv4 model was reduced from 186 MB to a 12 MB XKT file, representing a compression ratio of approximately 95%.
- Double-precision rendering of large 3D models
- Typical BIM-related features such as support for BIM Collaboration Format (BCF) issues, IFC metadata properties, annotations, measurement tools, element selection and filtering by type or custom property.
