= BIM Task Group =

The Building Information Modelling (BIM) Task Group was a UK Government-funded group, managed through the Cabinet Office, created in 2011, and superseded in 2017 by the Centre for Digital Built Britain.

== History ==
Holding its first meeting in May 2011 and chaired by Mark Bew, the BIM Task Group was founded to "drive adoption of BIM across government" in support of the Government Construction Strategy. It aimed to strengthen the public sector's capabilities in BIM implementation to that all central government departments could adopt, as a minimum, collaborative 'Level 2' BIM by 2016.

The core BIM task force, to which companies seconded employees, identified four work streams, each led by a core team member: stakeholder and media engagement, delivery and productivity, commercial and legal, and training and academia. Working parties were established to focus on particular areas including: training and education, COBie data set requirements, Plan of Works, software vendors (the BIM Technologies Alliance), contractors (UK Contractors Group, now superseded by Build UK), and materials and products suppliers (Construction Products Association).

In early 2014, it was announced that the BIM Task Group would be wound down during 2015, with a "managed handover" during 2015 to a newly created "legacy group", though there was speculation that the group's life might be extended to help achieve a new BIM 'Level 3' target.

In October 2016, an updated BIM Task Group delivering the February 2015 Digital Built Britain strategy was announced at the Institution of Civil Engineers BIM 2016 Conference in a keynote speech by Mark Bew. The work of the BIM Task Group then continued under the stewardship of the Cambridge-based Centre for Digital Built Britain (CDBB), announced in December 2017 and formally launched in early 2018.

Since 2016, industry adoption of BIM has been led by the UK BIM Alliance, (Note: In October 2022, the UK BIM Alliance rebranded as 'nima'.) formed to champion and enable the implementation of BIM, and to connect and represent organisations, groups and individuals working towards digital transformation of the UK's built environment industry. The former BIM Technologies Alliance was reconstituted as a group managed by the UK BIM Alliance. In October 2019, CDBB, the UK BIM Alliance and the BSI Group launched the UK BIM Framework. Superseding the BIM levels approach, the framework describes an overarching approach to implementing BIM in the UK, integrating the international ISO 19650 series of standards into UK processes and practice.
