= AecXML =

aecXML (architecture, engineering and construction extensible markup language) is a specific XML markup language which uses Industry Foundation Classes to create a vendor-neutral means to access data generated by building information modeling, BIM. It is being developed for use in the architecture, engineering, construction and facility management industries, in conjunction with BIM software, and is trademarked by the buildingSMART (the former International Alliance for Interoperability), a council of the National Institute of Building Sciences.

Specific subsets are being developed, namely:

- Common Object Schema
- Infrastructure
- Structural
- Facility management
- Procurement
- Project Management
- Plant Operations
- Building Environmental Performance

== See also ==
- Industry Foundation Classes
- BuildingSMART
- BIM Collaboration Format
