= Centre for Digital Built Britain =

UK university/government partnership

Centre for Digital Built Britain logo

The Centre for Digital Built Britain (CDBB) was a partnership between the University of Cambridge and UK's Department for Business, Energy and Industry Strategy. The CDBB was established in 2017 to support the transformation of the UK built environment using digital technologies to better design, build, maintain and integrate assets. Prior to its closure in March 2022, it was the home of the UK BIM programme, begun by the UK BIM Task Group (2011-2017), and the National Digital Twin programme.

== History ==
In May 2011, UK Government Chief Construction Adviser Paul Morrell called for adoption of Building Information Modelling (BIM) on UK government construction projects. The UK BIM Task Group was a UK Government-funded group, managed through the Cabinet Office, and created in 2011. Chaired by Mark Bew, it was founded to "drive adoption of BIM across government" in support of the Government Construction Strategy. It led the government's BIM programme and requirements, including a free-to-use set of UK standards and tools that defined 'level 2 BIM'. The BIM Task Group later took responsibility for delivering the Digital Built Britain strategy, published in February 2015.

The work of the BIM Task Group continued under the stewardship of the Cambridge-based Centre for Digital Built Britain, announced by the Department for Business, Innovation and Skills in December 2017 and formally launched in early 2018. Its role was to support the transformation of the UK's construction sector using digital technologies to better plan, build, maintain and use infrastructure.

In October 2019, the CDBB, the UK BIM Alliance (renamed 'nima' in 2022) and the BSI Group launched the UK BIM Framework. Superseding the BIM levels approach, the framework describes an overarching approach to implementing BIM in the UK, integrating the international ISO 19650 series of standards into UK processes and practice.

In March 2022, the CDBB completed its mission, passing the Digital Twin Hub, International Programme, and Climate Resilience Demonstrator to the Connected Places Catapult. The final research projects within the Construction Innovation Hub Programme will complete by September 2022.

== Structure and work ==
The CDBB was led by Professor Andy Neely, building on the work of the Cambridge Centre for Smart Infrastructure and Construction (CSIC), Cambridge Big Data, the Distributed Information and Automation Lab, the Cambridge Service Alliance and the Institute for Manufacturing. The CDBB was based in the CSIC's facility, the Maxwell Centre, in West Cambridge.

The CDBB was a member of the Construction Innovation Hub, alongside the Building Research Establishment and the Manufacturing Technology Centre, and collaborated with other partners in the Transforming Construction Sector Deal.

The Digital Built Britain strategy expanded the remit beyond BIM to include other digital processes and technologies, including new contractual frameworks, open data standards, data analytics and big data. For example, in November 2018, the CDBB published The Gemini Principles, a framework to guide the development of the National Digital Twin - an ecosystem of connected digital twins. The National Digital Twin was first recommended in the National Infrastructure Commission's December 2017 Data for the Public Good report. Mott MacDonald CTO Mark Enzer, Head of the National Digital Twin programme, was awarded OBE in October 2020.
