= Homer Hurst =

American architecture academic

Homer Theodore Hurst
- Born: October 25, 1919; Ozarks, Arkansas
- Died: October 31, 2011 (aged 92)
- Citizenship: United States
- Education: Ohio State University
- Occupation: Research Professor
- Years active: 1955-1990 (35 years)
- Employer: Virginia Tech
- Known for: Building technology research

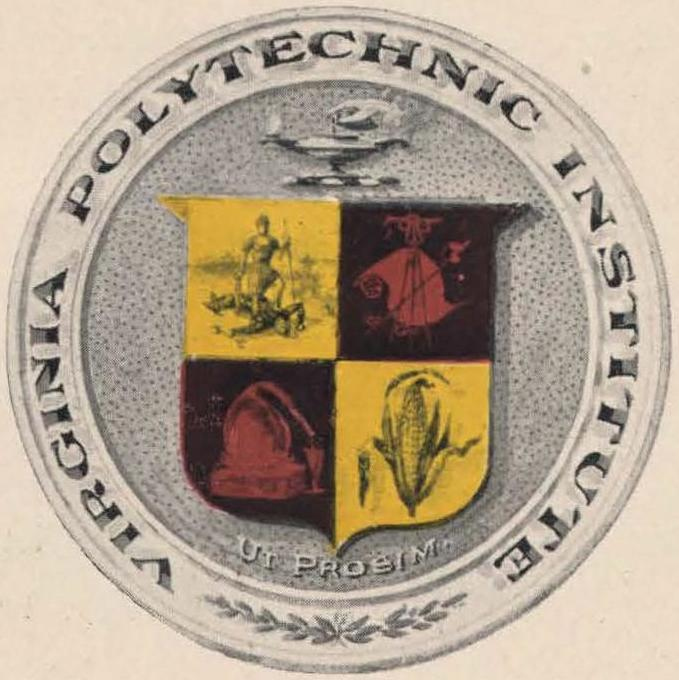

Homer Theodore Hurst (1919–2011) was a building industry innovator, award-winning professor, World War II veteran, and a founding member of the National Institute of Building Sciences.

== Early life and military ==
Homer Hurst was born on October 25, 1919, in the Ozark Mountains of Arkansas as one of nine children born to Theodore and Elva Harvey Hurst. Homer enlisted in the United States Navy in 1942, and served as a pilot in the South Pacific during World War II. Hurst married Beverly Arnold in 1944 and they had four children: Ted, Hyla, JaNan and Rhoda. Hurst continued in the Naval Reserves as a pilot for 20 years after the war, and flying became a lifelong passion.

== Education and career ==
Following his military service, Hurst graduated from Ohio State University with multiple engineering degrees in 1955 and became an agricultural engineering and architecture research professor at Virginia Tech. Hurst spent the next 35 years at Virginia Tech and was a charter member of the National Institute of Building Sciences in 1974. He retired in 1990 at the age of 70.

== Research projects ==
As an architecture research professor, Hurst received multiple awards from the U.S. Department of Housing and Urban Development (HUD) for his research project and publications.

=== "The Solar House" ===
Hurst's most notable research project is "The Solar House", a passive solar housing research project in Blacksburg, Virginia in 1980. The project demonstrated energy conservation methods based on passive solar principles and innovative wood framing techniques. Beyond its inventive passive solar design, a remarkable aspect of the project was its use of just one third of the typical amount of building materials of a traditional wood-framed home. This accounted for savings of more than 25% of overall construction costs and 44% of energy costs by using solar power. Hurst's design was selected as one of 19 finalist out of over 200 entries in HUD's "Building Value into Housing" competition in 1980. He and Jerry Smith presented the project in an article titled "The Hillside Fourplex Housing" in 1981. Construction of the prototype was completed in the summer of 1982. Since then, the quadruplex has been leased to Virginia Tech students. It is located at 500 Harrell St in Blacksburg, VA and is commonly referred to as "The Solar House".

=== Other published works and projects ===
Hurst published a number of his research projects in books, journals and magazines, including:

- Structurally balanced roof frames, (1963): Co-authored with JPH Mason
- Tilt-up timber rigid frame buildings, (1964): Co-authored with N.F. Meador, and E.L. Townsend, published by Virginia Tech.
- The wood frame house as a structural unit, (1965): Part I, Floor deflection as influenced by various stages of construction, published by Virginia Tech.
- The wood frame house as a structural unit, (1966): 29 pages, published by Virginia Tech.
- Pole-type, tilt-up economy house design: the first generation prototype, (1973): Published by Virginia Tech.
- Engineered housing reduces initial cost/accommodates solar heating, (1976): With Sandra J. Zettersten, for presentation at the annual meeting American Society of Agricultural Engineers
- Economical underground house structures, (1979): For presentation at the winter meeting American Society of Agricultural Engineers
- Structural Development and Evaluation of a Modular House, (1983): parts I&II: A study of A 12'x44' modular house, built with less than half the amount of lumber typically used to build the same sized house.
- Pole-Type Tilt-Up Design and Construction, (1984): co-authored with R.L Price III
- Who is responsible for the high cost of housing?, (1985): Article, Vol 19 (5) (September–October 1985)

Hurst's housing designs were often perceived by his peers as radical for their sparse, experimental and extremely economical utilization of building materials. However, by being both a materials and building code expert, Hurst was fully aware of a building's constructability in terms of the material's limitation and overall safety.

Hurst was a proponent of affordable housing, evident in his strong support for Habitat for Humanity. He also served on a governor appointed committee, formed to update Virginia's dated building codes. Being a veteran inspired Hurst with his efforts to improve military housing. In 1986, Mortimer M. Marshall, Jr., FAIA, fellow founding member of the National Institute of Building Sciences said, "Homer’s research at Virginia Tech was a great help in our efforts to improve the quality and performance of military housing throughout the world. His research results will continue to have an everlasting effect on the housing industry."

== Retirement and death ==
In 1990, after retiring from teaching, Homer T. Hurst remained in Blacksburg, VA and spent most of his time managing his rental properties during his retirement. Hurst died on October 31, 2011, shortly after his wife, Beverly's death on August 11 of the same year.
