= Mark Bew =

English engineer

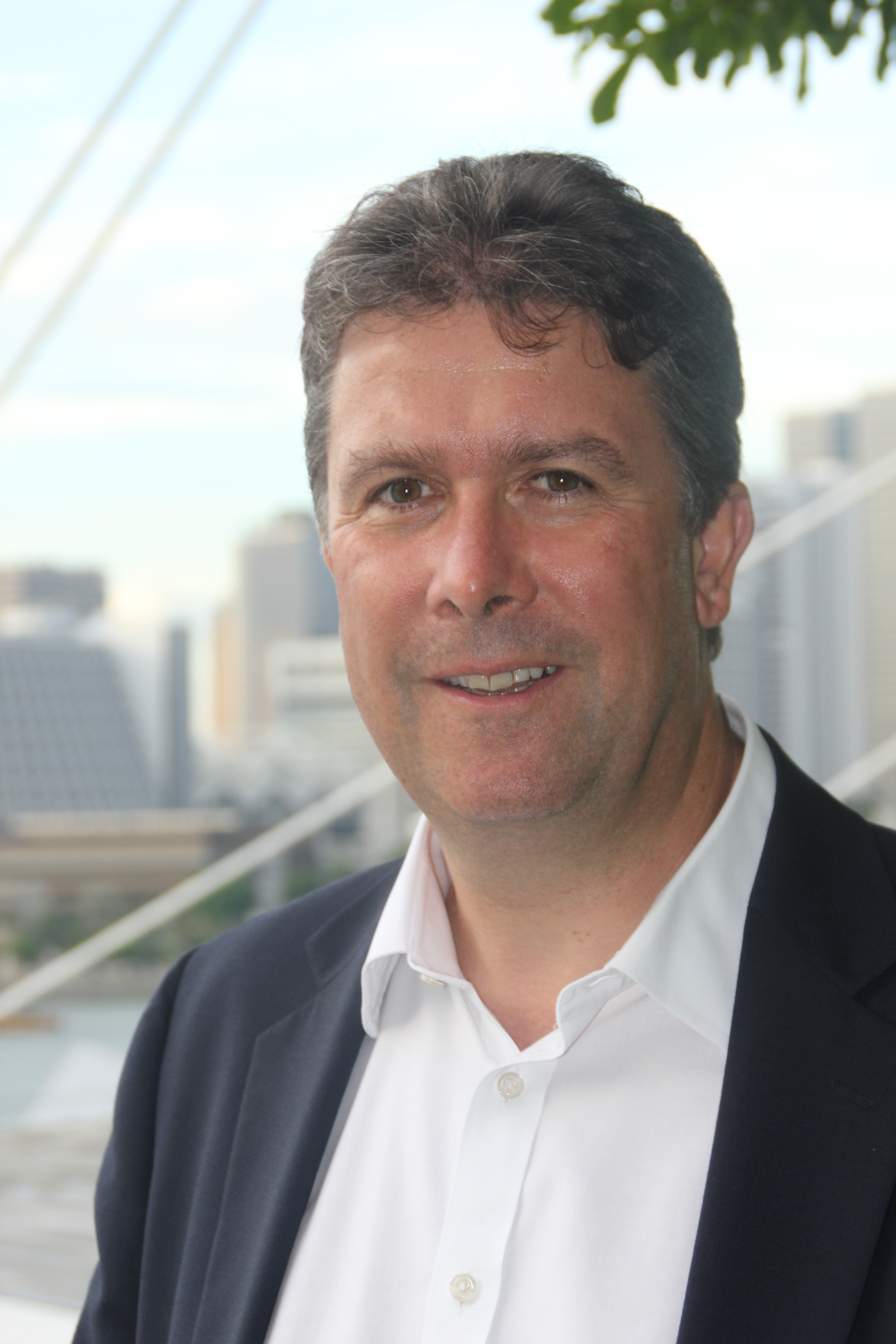
- Mark Bew in Singapore, October 2017
- Born: United Kingdom
- Occupation: Chairman of the Government BIM Task Group.
- Years active: 1983-present
- Mark Bew's voice recorded 11 October 2017

Mark Bew MBE (born 5 March 1967) is an English engineer and chairman of the PCSG consultancy business, formerly ECS. Until January 2015, he was also chairman of BuildingSMART's UK chapter, and, from 2011 to 2016, was chair of the UK Government's BIM Task Group, a body created to drive implementation of building information modelling (BIM) across UK public sector construction projects.

Mark Bew worked at John Laing Construction, was business systems director with Costain, and then director of business information systems at URS Scott Wilson, before founding his own company, Engineering Construction Strategies (now a division of PCSG), to focus on the UK BIM strategy. In January 2012, he was recognised in the New Year Honours with an MBE for services to the construction sector.
