= BCF =

BCF may refer to:

== Organizations ==
- Bangladesh Chess Federation, governing body for chess in Bangladesh
- Balkan Communist Federation, a left-wing movement
- Baptist College of Florida, private college in Graceville, Florida
- Bendheim Center for Finance, an interdisciplinary research center of Princeton University
- Belgian Cricket Federation
- Boating Camping and Fishing, an Australian retail shop
- Border City Firm, a hooligan firm associated with Carlisle United Football Club
- British Chess Federation, former name of the English Chess Federation
- BC Ferries, British Columbia, Canada
- British Cycling Federation, former name British Cycling, the national governing body for cycle racing in Great Britain
- Burlington Coat Factory, an American national department store retailer for clothes and shoes

== Science and technology ==
- Base station control function, a part of the base station subsystem in a cellular telephone network
- Billion cubic feet, a unit of measurement
- Blake canonical form, a class of logical expressions
- Bioconcentration factor, the accumulation of a chemical in or on an organism when the source of the chemical is solely water
- Bromochlorodifluoromethane, used in fire extinguishers
- Buffy coat fusion, a therapy used in the field of bone marrow transplantation
- Bulked Continuous Filament, heatset artificial fibre
- Tris(pentafluorophenyl)borane, a chemical compound
- BIM Collaboration Format, a building information model file format

== Other uses ==
- Bamu language, spoken in Papua New Guinea (ISO 639-3 code: bcf)
- Beaconsfield railway station (England), Buckinghamshire, England (National Rail station code: BCF)
- Boeing Converted Freighter, a type of Cargo aircraft
