= Whole Building Design Guide =

The Whole Building Design Guide or WBDG is a web-based platform that provides comprehensive access to building guidance, federal facility criteria, tools, and workforce development resources from a "whole building" approach. The WBDG serves government and industry practitioners by offering centralized, authoritative technical guidance and standards for the planning, design, construction, and operation of high-performing buildings. The WBDG is managed by the National Institute of Building Sciences. The WBDG's tagline is that it is "the only online portal providing architects, engineers, and building owners with comprehensive guidance, and federal criteria for high-performance whole-building design".

== History and Development ==
=== Origins ===
The WBDG has served as a federal-industry resource for the building community for more than 25 years. It was initially designed to serve U.S. Department of Defense (DOD) construction programs. A 2003 DOD memorandum named WBDG the “sole portal to design and construction criteria produced by the U.S. Army Corps of Engineers (USACE), Naval Facilities Engineering Command (NAVFAC), and U.S. Air Force.” Since then, WBDG has expanded to serve all building industry professionals. The majority of its 500,000 monthly users are from the private sector.

=== Institutional Context ===
The WBDG operates under the stewardship of the National Institute of Building Sciences (NIBS), a congressionally chartered, non-governmental non-profit organization. The US Government established legislation to create NIBS in 1974 to serve as a bridge between government and the private sector on matters related to building science, technology, and standards. The WBDG fulfills key aspects that mission by providing an open, accessible repository of technical knowledge and best practices that informs through best practices and standards building design, procurement, construction, operation, maintenance, commissioning, and retirement.

=== Mission of the Whole Building Design Guide ===
"To promote and protect the national interests in both the public and private sectors by facilitating acceptance and adoption of standards, innovation, and practice at the federal, state, and local level. The WBDG specifically supports the assembly, storage, and dissemination of nationally recognized performance criteria, standards, and best practices."

== Development ==
Development of the WBDG is a collaborative effort among federal agencies, private sector companies, non-profit organizations and educational institutions. The WBDG web site maintained by the National Institute of Building Sciences through funding support from the DOD, the NAVFAC Engineering Innovation and Criteria Office, U.S. Army Corps of Engineers, the U.S. Air Force, the U.S. General Services Administration (GSA), the U.S. Department of Veterans Affairs, the National Aeronautics and Space Administration (NASA), and the U.S. Department of Energy (DOE), and the assistance of the Sustainable Buildings Industry Council (SBIC). A Board of Direction and an Advisory Committee consisting of representatives from over 25 participating federal agencies guide the development of the WBDG.

A significant amount of the Whole Building Design Guide content is organized by three categories: Design Guidance, Project Management, and Operations and Maintenance. It is structured to provide WBDG visitors first a broad understanding then increasingly specific information more targeted towards building industry professionals. The WBDG is the resource that federal agencies look to for policy and technical guidance on Federal High Performance and Sustainable Buildings In addition, the WBDG contains online tools, the original Construction Criteria Base, Building Information Modeling guides and libraries, a database of select case studies, federal mandates and other resources. The WBDG also provides over 70 online continuing education courses for architects and other building professionals, free of charge.
