= System information modelling =

System information modelling (SIM) is the process of modelling complex connected systems. System information models are digital representations of connected systems, such as electrical instrumentation and control, power, and communication systems. The objects modelled in a SIM have a 1:1 relationship with the objects in the physical system. Components, connections and functions are defined and linked as they would be in the real world.

== Origins ==
The concept of SIM has existed since the mid-1990s. It was first proposed in 1994 by an Australian instrument, electrical and control system engineering company – I&E Systems Pty Ltd. Like many technological innovations the idea for SIM was born out of necessity. Since the mid-nineties, the complexity of power, control and Information and Communication Technology (ICT) systems has been growing exponentially due to rapid advances in technology; this has rendered the traditional paper-based methodologies and applications used for system design to become obsolete.

The cost of design related activities can be up to 70% of the total project expenditure in an electrical instrumentation and control system (EICS) engineering project. Analyses revealed that the limited nature of paper-based methods/workflows had significant contributions to the high design cost which required duplication of information on multiple documents resulting in design errors and omissions and therefore increasing the cost of labour. With this in mind, the company realized there is a need to shift away from the traditional paper-based methods to a more efficient systematic digital modelling approach.

The term 'System Information Modelling' was first published in a technical report in 2012 by Peter E.D. Love and Jingyang Zhou. The report presented empirical evidence to demonstrate that the use of a SIM could potentially improve productivity and reduce the cost to produce EICS documentation. The research examined a set of electrical engineering drawings of an Iron Ore Stacker Conveyor system; errors and omissions identified from the drawings have been classified and quantified. The report concluded that the use of traditional Computer-Aided-Design (CAD) methods to produce electrical engineering design is ineffective, inefficient and costly.

Since 2013, a number of scholarly research papers have been published that have demonstrated the effectiveness and efficiency of using a SIM instead of CAD to design and document EICS in a variety of projects (e.g., iron ore processing plant, FPSO safety control system, copper smelter plant, oil refinery, and a geothermal power plant).

== Definition ==
System Information Modelling can be defined as the process of digitally modelling a complex connected system. A System Information Model is a shared information resource of a system forming a reliable basis of knowledge during its life-cycle.

== Throughout the life-cycle ==
A SIM containing all the project information can be applied throughout the entire life-cycle of the project.

=== Design ===
Engineering design and documentation can be undertaken simultaneously when using a SIM. A SIM can be created as the design of an EICS progresses. Draftsman and modellers are no longer required. When a SIM is applied to the design of a connected system, all physical equipment and the associated connections to be constructed can be modelled in a relational database. Components are classified according to 'Type' and 'Location' attributes. The 'Type' attribute is used to define equipment functionalities. The 'Location' attribute is used to describe the physical position of equipment. Connections between equipment are modelled as 'connectors'. To facilitate the design, attributes, such as a device module, specifications and vendor manuals can be assigned and attached to each individual object.

When the design process is complete, a read only copy of the model is created, exported and made available to other project team members. The users can access all or part of the design information within the SIM regarding to their respective authorization levels. Private user data can be established and attached to the model.

=== Procurement and construction ===
When the design is approved for construction, a SIM, which is a digital realization of the design, can be issued to different parties such as the procurement team and construction contractors. Information management can be achieved digitally and the role of paper drawings is eliminated. The procurement plan and construction schedule can be created for each individual object in the SIM. Construction activities can be assigned to objects or work-packs with weighting factors defined. This enables the managers to be able to track the progresses of the procurement and construction detailed to individual object level and make informed decisions.

=== Asset management ===
A SIM is specifically useful for asset managers, as it enables information to be stored in a single digital model. In a traditional CAD-based environment paper drawings are typically handed over to the asset owner in the form of 'As Built' drawings, which reflect, in theory, the actual construction of every system, component and connection of a project. If an asset manager wants to maintain, repair or upgrade any portion of the asset, then the 'As Built' drawings need to be used. However, recovering information contained on an array of drawings is a tedious and time-consuming task. Any error or omission contained within the drawings will potentially hinder the interpretation of the design.

When engineering is undertaken using a SIM it can be stored in a digital format whereby a 1:1 mapping is undertaken. Operations such as test, calibration, inspection, repair, minor change and isolation can be defined and scheduled within the SIM. The SIM data can also be conveniently exported and input into other third party asset management applications to comply with the owners' asset management strategy. In addition, the SIM can act as a training tool, which can be used regularly to assist operators to become familiar with the design.

== Software ==
A commercial proprietary software package, Digital Asset Delivery (DAD), has been developed based on the concept of System Information Modelling (SIM) by I&E Systems Pty Ltd.

The initial version of DAD was released in 1997 which was primarily a modelling tool used to design and document the electrical engineering system. Since it was born, DAD has been tested and applied to many projects including but not limited to greenfield and brownfield, power, control and ICT systems. The DAD software has been continuously maintained and upgraded to cater for complex and rapid changing EICS projects. The latest release of DAD is version 13. DAD provides several facilities to capture the complexities of today's systems including: LAYERS (e.g. Assembly (Physical): How is it built?, Control (Functional): How does it work? etc.), RELATIONSHIPS - links between components on different layers, GROUPS - components and connectors with common features. DAD works closely with its partner application ActivityExchange which builds upon the power of the digital model to allow users to define, organise, track and exchange work to be done on any project. Once completed, each distinct record of work can be appended in to the digital model for future reference and historical continuity. ActivityExchange manages real-time workflows of all human interaction with system components including design review, procurement, construction, commissioning and finally maintenance.

== International development ==
The concept of SIM has been applied and verified in a number of international projects.

=== Australia ===
There are a number of Australian-based organisations in various industry sectors benefitting from SIM technology. A few examples:

Fortescue based in Western Australia has adopted SIM for all their projects built since 2010. These projects include the large scale Solomon Iron Ore project, the expansion of their export port facility and the North Star magnetite project. Fortescue acknowledges that using SIM on these projects resulted in large savings and more efficient project execution and that it continues to provide benefits for the operation of these facilities.

Opticomm builds, owns and operates a large fibre optic communications network which connects tens of thousands of residential and commercial properties. Their network is totally modelled using SIM and all their construction and operations activities are based on the information in their SIM based information model.

In 2016, Perth Airport adopted the SIM and they had its power distribution network modelled using this technology. The electrical components and cable objects in their SIM are linked to the objects in their geographic information system (GIS). This seamlessly provides full system technical and geographical information about all their electrical system components and cables. Perth Airport has plans to expand the use of SIM to their other connected systems like runway lighting systems, and communication networks.

=== China ===
SIM has been applied to model and manage the electrical and communication systems of the Wuhan Metro Stations in China in 2014. In 2016, a SIM model was created to digitize the distributed control system (DCS) of the Wuhan International Expo Centre. Since 2014, a number of research projects have been undertaken by the BIM Centre of Huazhong University of Science and Technology including SIM application, linking SIM to BIM and linking SIM to Engineering Information Modelling (EIM).

=== Saudi Arabia ===
In 2015, SIM was applied by a large Japanese Engineering and Construction company to model the electrical and instrumentation systems on a very large new oil refinery project in Saudi Arabia. The SIM was used as the basis for management of all procurement and construction activities through Procurement and Construction Portals.

=== Europe ===
In 2018, SIM was applied by a large logistics company in Ireland to model their entire ICT Infrastructure in advance of a significant hardware and software refresh. SIM was used to map the high level business processes of the organisation down to the specific and individual records held in each system by the organisation, assuring migration success to a new ERP as well as providing compliance and assurance on GDPR requirements. The SIM was used as the Configuration Management Database (CMDB) to facilitate the ongoing project activities required to upgrade the organisations technologies and will become an inherent part of their IT operations.

== SIM and BIM ==
System information modelling is different from building information modeling, though both focus on sharing knowledge and information. The process of BIM has been defined as:

Building information modeling (BIM) is a digital representation of physical and functional characteristics of a facility. A BIM is a shared knowledge resource for information about a facility forming a reliable basis for decisions during its life-cycle; defined as existing from earliest conception to demolition.

A SIM is akin to BIM; 'Building' is replaced with 'System' to represent the process of modeling complex connected systems, such as electrical control, power and communications, which do not possess geometry. Essentially, a SIM takes a discipline specific perspective to model complex connected systems, but can be integrated with a building information model when a single point of truth is formed.

The traditional way of documenting the design of the connected system is to use 2D drawings that are created by draftsmen and consist of various views that must be used jointly to form an integrated design. As the drawings are created manually and the information for a component could be represented on several different drawings, the propensity for errors, omission, conflicts and duplications to materialize significantly increases. Since the mid-1970s, there has been a trend to replace the traditional manually drafted drawings with computer aided digital drawings. Though efficiencies in creating drawings has been improved since the introduction of CAD, there remains an over reliance on the production of paper based documentation despite the emergence of 'digital' engineering. With the introduction of SIM, productivity benefits can be achieved, particularly during the operations and maintenance of assets for EICS.

SIM is not restricted to the EICS, power and communication systems. It can be used to model a variety of connected systems such as network topology, causal loop and interactions between people and organizations. The application scope of SIM is beyond the 'physical facility' that has been defined for BIM, which enables the SIM to be applicable to model both the physical and virtual networks of the connected systems.

== Extended applications ==
A SIM can be linked to Geographical Information Systems to support the management of spatial information. For example, a SIM model with components assigned by coordinates can be linked to Google Earth to show the real physical locations of the components. A SIM can also be linked to third party 3D models, using applications such as Autodesk Navisworks, to gain spatial support and also provide detailed system data to the third parties. Interoperability can be achieved between SIM and a variety of technologies such as image modelling, Google Maps, virtual reality, augmented reality, Quick Response code, and radio-frequency identification.

== See also ==
- Information model
- Building information modeling
- System engineering
- System design
