= Mark Enzer =

British engineer

Mark Enzer OBE FREng
- Citizenship: United Kingdom
- Education: Oxford University
- Occupation: CTO
- Years active: 1990 - present
- Employer: Mott MacDonald
- Title: MSc, MBA
- Awards: OBE

Mark Timothy Jon Enzer, OBE, is a British engineer. He is the CTO of consultancy Mott MacDonald and former head of the National Digital Twin Programme at the Centre for Digital Built Britain.

== Education ==
In 1987, Enzer graduated from Oxford University (Engineering Science) and in 1992 from Leeds University (Tropical Public Health Engineering). In 2004 he received MBA degree from University of Cambridge.

== Career ==
From November 2009 to March 2012, Enzer was engineering manager at Anglian Water's @one Alliance.

=== Mott MacDonald ===
From April 2012 to July 2013, he was Engineering Director of Mott MacDonald's Water Division. He then served as global water sector leader until December 2016, and was appointed as chief technical officer in January 2017.

=== Centre for Digital Built Britain ===
From April 2020 until April 2022, Enzer was head of the National Digital Twin Programme and chair of CDBB's Digital Framework Task Group.

== Honours ==
In the 2020 Birthday Honours, Enzer was awarded OBE for his services to national infrastructure. In 2021 he was elected a Fellow of the Royal Academy of Engineering.
