= Gable CAD =

- Developer(s): Sheffield University; Gable CAD Systems
- Initial release: 1985
- Platform: UNIX
- Type: computer-aided design
- License: commercial software

Gable CAD, or Gable 4D Series, was a British architectural computer-aided design package initially developed in the early 1980s.

== History ==
Gable CAD was developed at the University of Sheffield in the mid-1980s under the leadership of Professor Bryan Lawson. It was spun out into Gable CAD Systems Limited (incorporated in 1984) and retained links with the university until its demise in 1996 when a court order was made for compulsory winding up.

An early building information modeling application, Gable CAD was an advanced 2D and 3D design package with different modules, and was operated via a Windows-style interface and mouse running on UNIX. It was possible to create detailed 3D models and then generate 2D drawings or rendered visualisations from the data.

The assets of the company were acquired by Auxer in 1997 and aimed to complete the conversion of Gable CAD to Windows NT but this does not appear to have ever been released.
