= Information Delivery Specification =

Information Delivery Specification (IDS) is a description format in the construction industry for specifying information for BIM building model and checking it automatically.

IDS (like IFC) is defined by buildingSMART; version 1.0 was published in June 2024.

== Description ==
An IDS file is a machine-readable document that specifies requirements for a building model. It requires attributes to be supplied, or which attribute values are accepted. For example, it can require that the thermal transmittance of all windows in the building must be within a prescribed range, or that all room names must follow a regular expression such as "Office001".

A typical workflow is:

1. Requirements are described on the client side using an IDS editor (also available free of charge).
2. Requirements are taken into account during planning; BIM software can support the planner.
3. Requirements are checked automatically with the IDS file and the building model as an IFC file.
