= Lori Peek =

American sociologist (born 1975)

Professor Lori Peek
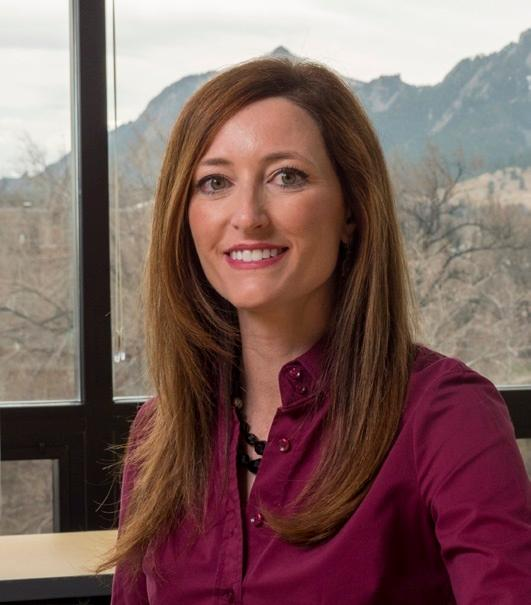
- Citizenship: United States
- Education: PhD Sociology, University of Colorado Boulder; MEd Education, Colorado State University; BA Sociology, Ottawa University
- Occupations: Professor, Department of Sociology, University of Colorado Boulder; Director, Natural Hazards Center, University of Colorado Boulder
- Known for: Sociology of Disaster, Race, Ethnicity, Religion, Sex and Gender, Children and Youth, Qualitative Methods, Environmental Sociology
- Notable work: Behind the Backlash: Muslim Americans after 9/11 (2010)
- Website: Official website

Lori Peek is an American sociologist, academic, and author. She is a professor in the Department of Sociology as well as the director of the Natural Hazards Center in the Institute of Behavioral Science at the University of Colorado Boulder. Furthermore, she is a presidentially-appointed member of the board of directors at the National Institute of Building Sciences.

Peek is most known for her works on the sociology of disaster, children and youth, gender, religion, qualitative methods, and environmental sociology. Among her authored works are her publications in academic journals, including Sociology of Religion, Child Development, and Natural Hazards as well as books such as Behind the Backlash: Muslim Americans After 9/11, Children of Katrina, and The Continuing Storm: Learning from Katrina. Moreover, she has co-edited two volumes including Displaced: Life in the Katrina Diaspora and the Handbook of Environmental Sociology. She served as social science lead and a contributing author to Safer, Stronger, Smarter: A Guide to Improving School Natural Hazard Safety.

== Education ==
Peek earned her Bachelor of Arts in Sociology from Ottawa University in Ottawa, Kansas in 1997, followed by a Master's in Education and Human Resource Studies from Colorado State University in Fort Collins, Colorado in 1999. In 2005, she completed her Doctor of Philosophy in Sociology from the University of Colorado Boulder in Boulder, Colorado.

== Career ==
After receiving her doctorate, she was hired at Colorado State University, where she held the position of assistant professor in the Sociology department from 2005 to 2011. Subsequently, she was promoted to associate professor of Sociology at Colorado State University with an appointment in the Colorado School of Public Health from 2011 to 2016. Additionally, from 2013 to 2020, she held an adjunct research scientist appointment at the National Center for Disaster Preparedness at Columbia University. Since 2017, she has been a professor in the Department of Sociology at the University of Colorado Boulder.

Peek served as president of the Research Committee on Disasters for the International Sociological Association from 2015 to 2018. Notably, she was the first woman to be elected to this role. She also serves on the board of directors at the National Institute of Building Sciences for the term 2021 to 2025, having been appointed by President Joseph R. Biden and approved by the U.S. Senate.

Peek has received awards for her undergraduate and graduate teaching and her mentoring of students and postdoctoral scholars. She was a co-principal Investigator for a National Science Foundation INCLUDES grant focused on Capacity Building in Disaster Research for Scholars from Underrepresented Groups. Since 2014, she has served as a founding board member for the Bill Anderson Fund, which provides mentoring to Black, Latinx, and Indigenous doctoral students in disaster research and hazard mitigation.

== Works ==
In her first book, titled Behind the Backlash: Muslim Americans After 9/11, Peek drew on federal hate crime statistics, bias crime reports, field observations, and 140 in-depth interviews to characterize the discussed post-9/11 experiences of young Muslim Americans. The book explored the breadth of discrimination that Muslims experienced after 9/11, the collective consequences for this group, and the ways that Muslim Americans coped. In a review of the book, Nikkia DeLuz of Lynn University, wrote, "This study is significant because it provides outstanding and relevant insight into the public and political reaction to crisis events and the subsequent marginalization of members of society due to catastrophes beyond their control. Peek's research is also important because the results of her longitudinal and qualitative effort, provides the reader with testimonials that are compelling and invaluable to an understanding of the human and societal components and consequences resulting from crisis events."

In 2012, sociologist Lynn Weber and Peek co-edited Displaced: Life in the Katrina Diaspora, offering an examination of Hurricane Katrina evacuees' challenges, emphasizing the disproportionate impact on low-income African American women and showcasing their resilience in rebuilding lives nationwide. In her review of the book, Kirsten Dellinger from the University of Mississippi said "This gripping edited volume provides an in-depth analysis of the experiences of New Orleanians displaced by Gulf Coast-wrecking Katrina in August 2005." Further, she observes that the work grew out of a long-term collaboration between a collective of social scientists, and wrote that the "result of their dedication to engaged community research is a strong, cohesive, feminist collection with a refreshing focus on women's first-hand accounts, deft analysis of the importance of social context, and a careful and consistent exploration of the hierarchies of race, class, gender, age, and citizenship and the role they played in making this storm a social disaster."

Alice Fothergill and Peek's 2015 book, Children of Katrina, is an ethnography of children after a disaster. Over nearly a decade of research, they explored the recovery trajectories of children and youth, highlighting the impact of Katrina on child well-being, family dynamics, and community connections, and emphasizing the crucial factors that either facilitated or hindered their recovery. In his review of the book, Timothy J. Haney from Mount Royal University said "Children of Katrina serves as an exemplar of committed, dedicated, disaster research done out of an earnest desire to improve the lives of Katrina-affected children."

Peek co-edited the 2021 Handbook of Environmental Sociology. Consisting of 25 chapters, the text offers an overview of the state of the field.

Kai Erikson and Peek's 2022 book, The Continuing Storm: Learning from Katrina, is the last volume in the Katrina Bookshelf series. The book focuses on the human causes and consequences of Katrina and offers an expanded view of the enduring human costs of the catastrophe across time and space. In his review of the book, Ethan Raker of the University of British Columbia said "Erikson and Peek make clear... that many people continue to carry with them the consequences of Katrina, some of whom are suffering due to compounding collective traumas."

== Research ==
Peek's research has primarily centered around the ways in which various forms of social inequality manifest in everyday lives and during times of disaster. Her published work explores vulnerabilities as related to the intersections between race, ethnicity, religion, gender, social class, and age. She has conducted meta-reviews on topics such as poverty, gender, the elderly, and children. She, along with collaborators has published work on ethics in disaster research, qualitative approaches in youth-centered research, interdisciplinary research, and convergent approaches to solving societal problems.

In 2000, Peek collaborated with Dennis Mileti to examine public responses to impending nuclear power plant emergencies, underscoring the importance of effective warning dissemination methods. She delineated the three fundamental components of a warning system, summarized elements of public response, and dispelled popular myths, drawing on recent research.

Moving forward to 2004, Alice Fothergill and Peek's 2004 study shed light on the disproportionate vulnerability of the economically disadvantaged in the United States to natural hazards. Factors such as residential location, building construction, and social exclusion were identified as key contributors to their heightened exposure of those in poverty to disaster susceptibility. This research advocated for a comprehensive approach to disaster risk reduction, acknowledging the need for tailored support mechanisms for the economically challenged. In subsequent research, she advanced a more holistic and child-centered approach to understanding and addressing the impacts of disasters on children, acknowledging their vulnerabilities but also recognizing their potential contributions and the necessity of tailored support mechanisms. Moreover, her collaborative work with Laura M. Stough critically reviewed existing literature on children with disabilities in disaster situations. This research highlighted factors contributing to their vulnerability, such as higher poverty rates and traumatic loss, emphasizing the crucial need for protective measures and swift reestablishment of social networks for positive post-disaster outcomes.

Peek's 2005 study delved into the formation of religious identity in second-generation Muslim Americans. The study identified three developmental stages and emphasized the pivotal role of 9/11 in shaping identity salience for religious minorities. Additionally, her collaborative research with Elaine Enarson and Alice Fothergill emphasized the importance of an international, nuanced approach to gender in disaster social science. This work also underscored the necessity of addressing sex and gender-based inequalities for effective disaster risk reduction, particularly focusing on safeguarding the rights of women and girls in crisis situations. In 2021, she and Mithra Moezzi explored the use of researchers' and practitioners' stories as tools to advance interdisciplinary disaster research, suggesting that integrating such narratives into interdisciplinary teams can foster collaborative learning, provide naturalistic insights often missed by formal theories, and break away from discipline-specific reasoning.

Peek serves as the principal investigator for several research projects including the Clearinghouse on Natural Hazards Applications and the CONVERGE facility. She also is the principal investigator for the Social Science Extreme Events Research (SSEER) and Interdisciplinary Science and Engineering Extreme Events Research (ISEEER) Networks. In 2019, she was awarded funding from the U.S. Geological Survey to launch a study concerning the adoption of earthquake early warning in schools in the Western United States. Prior to that, she led an evaluation effort to understand the readiness of Voluntary Organizations Active in Disaster (VOAD) to protect children in emergencies.

== Awards and honors ==
- 2007 – Best Teacher Award, Colorado State University Alumni Association and the Student Alumni Connection
- 2009 – Early Career Award for Outstanding Contributions to Scholarship, American Sociological Association Section on Children and Youth
- 2010 – Professor of the Year, Colorado State University Greek Life and the Panhellenic Council
- 2012 – President's Award for Volunteer Service, National Hazards Mitigation Association
- 2012 – Distinguished Book Award for Behind the Backlash: Muslim Americans after 9/11, Midwest Sociological Society
- 2013 – Best Book Award for Behind the Backlash: Muslim Americans after 9/11, American Sociological Association Section on Altruism, Morality, and Social Solidarity
- 2015 – Ann Gill Excellence in Teaching Award, College of Liberal Arts, Colorado State University
- 2016 – Board of Governor's Excellence in Undergraduate Teaching Award, Colorado State University System
- 2016 – Outstanding Scholarly Contribution Award for Children of Katrina, American Sociological Association
- 2016 – Betty and Alfred McClung Lee Book Award for Children of Katrina, Association for Humanist Sociology
- 2017 – Outstanding Achievement Award, Ottawa University Alumni Association
- 2019 – Outstanding Postdoc Mentor Award, Office of Postdoctoral Affairs, University of Colorado Boulder
- 2021 – Environmental Sociology Distinguished Contribution Award, Section on Environmental Sociology, American Sociological Association

== Bibliography ==
=== Books ===
- Behind the Backlash: Muslim Americans After 9/11 (2010) ISBN 9781592139835
- Displaced: Life in the Katrina Diaspora (2012) ISBN 9780292737648
- Children of Katrina (2015) ISBN 9781477305461
- Handbook of Environmental Sociology (2021) ISBN 9783030777111
- The Continuing Storm: Learning from Katrina (2022) ISBN 9781477324332

=== Selected articles ===
- Fothergill, A., & Peek, L. A. (2004). Poverty and disasters in the United States: A review of recent sociological findings. Natural Hazards, 32, pages 89–110.
- Peek, L. (2005). Becoming Muslim: The development of a religious identity. Sociology of Religion, 66(3), pages 215–242.
- Peek, L. (2008). Children and disasters: Understanding vulnerability, developing capacities, and promoting resilience—An introduction. Children, Youth, and Environments, 18(1), pages 1–29.
- Enarson, E., Fothergill, A., & Peek, L. (2007). Gender and disaster: Foundations and directions. Handbook of Disaster Research, pages 130–146.
- Mileti, D. S., & Peek, L. (2000). The social psychology of public response to warnings of a nuclear power plant accident. Journal of Hazardous Materials, 75(2–3), pages 181–194.
- Peek, L. & Stough, L.M. (2010). Children with disabilities in the context of disaster: A social vulnerability perspective. Child Development, 81(4), pages 1260–1270.
- Peek L. & Fothergill, A. (2009). Using focus groups: Lessons from studying daycare centers, 9/11, and Hurricane Katrina. Qualitative Research, 9(1), pages 31–59.
