= Digital Building Logbook =

The Digital Building Logbook is a proposal aiming at establishing a common European approach that aggregates all relevant data about a building and ensures that authorised people can access accurate information about the building.

== See also ==
- Energy performance certificate
- Building information modeling
