= COBie =

Specification relating to managed asset information

Construction Operations Building Information Exchange (COBie) is a United States-originated specification relating to managed asset information including space and equipment. It is closely associated with building information modeling (BIM) approaches to design, construction, and management of built assets.

== Purpose ==
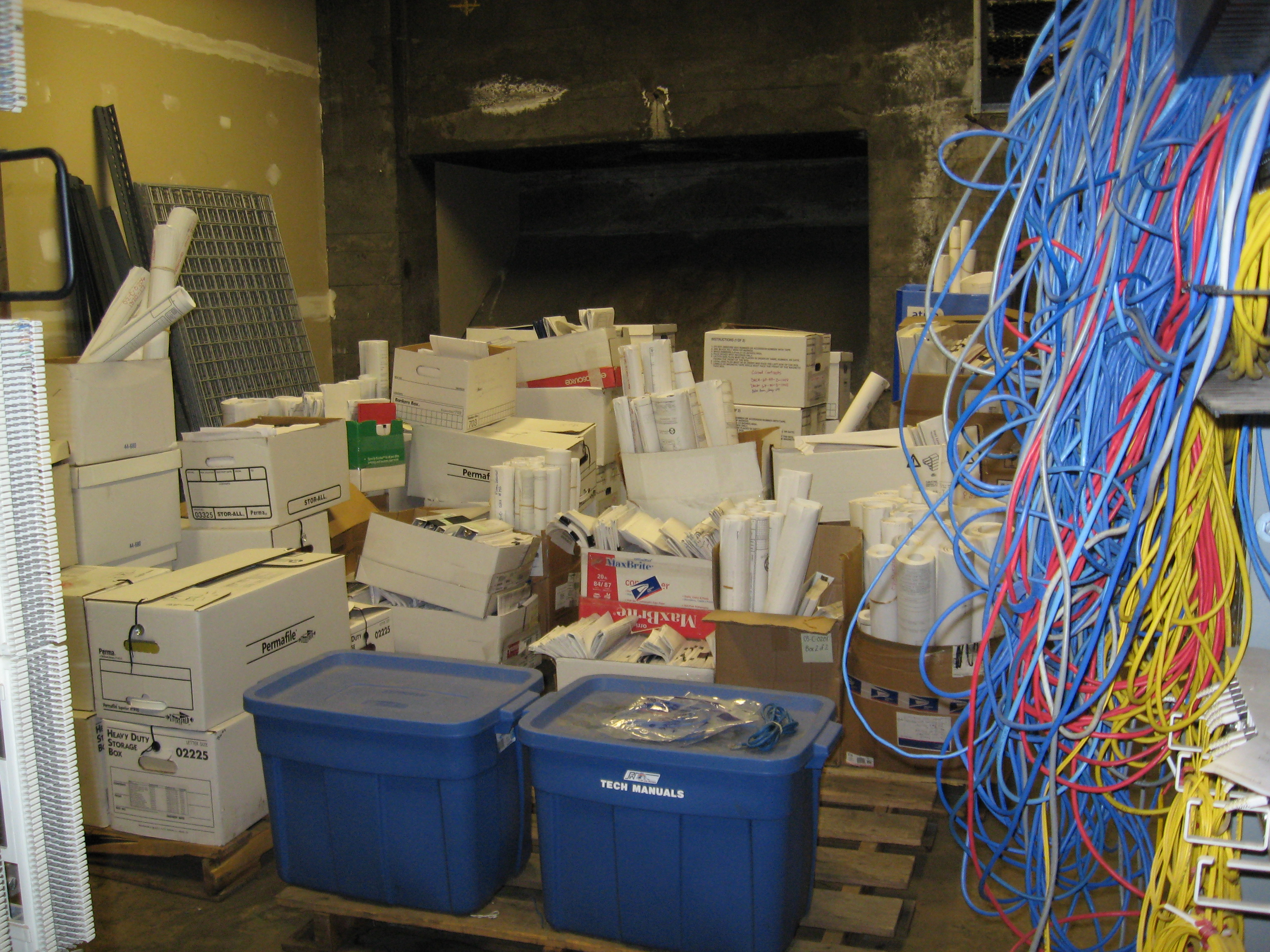
Figure 1. Traditional construction handover documentation

COBie helps organisations to electronically capture and record important project data at the point of origin, including equipment lists, product data sheets, warranties, spare parts lists, and preventive maintenance schedules. This information is essential to support operations, maintenance and asset management once the built asset is in service, replacing reliance on uncoordinated, often paper-based, handover information typically created by people who did not participate in the project and delivered many months after the client has taken occupancy of the building (see figure 1).

COBie has been incorporated into software for planning, design, construction, commissioning, operations, maintenance, and asset management. COBie may take several approved formats include spreadsheet, STEP-Part 21 (also called IFC file format), and ifcXML. The current COBie test data of record was developed by an international team of designers and builders in the US and UK. This information is available under Creative Commons Licence.

== History ==
=== Initial concept (2006-2007 ) ===
COBie was developed by Bill East, of the US Army Corps of Engineers, while at the Construction Engineering Research Laboratory in 2007. The project was funded with an initial grant from the US National Aeronautics and Space Administration (NASA) and the White House Office of Science and Technology Policy (through National Institute of Standards and Technology). Following this introduction, East has led COBie development through buildingSMART International (BSI; formerly the International Alliance for Interoperability) processes.

=== Concept to adoption (2008-2015) ===
From 2008 to 2015, the Construction Engineering Research Lab conducted a series of public events to demonstrate the ability of commercial software to produce and/or consume COBie data (in associated date-related version). In these events, software companies were often arranged at the front of a large conference room in order: planning, design, construction, maintenance management, and asset management. The COBie data flow (COBie is about building equipment only) was demonstrated. Over 90% of those participating delivered information in the COBie spreadsheet format. The other software exported spreadsheet format data from Coordination MVD STEP files so that others could use this data.

In 2009, COBie version 2.26 was published as the buildingSMART International Basic FM Handover Model View Model Definition using the Industry Foundation Class Model 2x3.

In December 2011, COBie 2.26 was approved and included by the US Chapter of buildingSMART International as part of its National Building Information Model (NBIMS-US) standard, version 2. Around this same time, the US buildingSMART alliance was de-listed as an authorized chapter of the buildingSMART International.

In early 2013, buildingSMART was working on a lightweight XML format for COBie, COBieLite, which became available for review in April 2013.

In September 2014, a code of practice regarding COBie was issued as a British Standard: "BS 1192-4:2014 Collaborative production of information Part 4: Fulfilling employer’s information exchange requirements using COBie – Code of practice". This requirement is a one line reference to the National Building Information Modeling Standard - United States (NBIMS-US), Chapter 4.2, the document that eventually published COBie version 2.4.

In March 2015, the buildingSMART USA published COBie version 2.4 in NBIMS-US, Chapter 4.2. This COBie MVD, produced under contract to the Construction Engineering Research Lab, was created by the buildingSMART international Model View Definition support group, and was based on IFC 4. The main standard contains the project's Information Delivery Manual and Model View Definition as well as business case and implementation resources. Annex A defines the mapping from the EXPRESS-based data model to the COBie spreadsheet format. Annex B defines a National Information Exchange Model (NIEM) based XML schema suitable for use to capture transactional COBie data that does not require a full set of building information exchange.

In 2017, the US General Services Administration required COBie as a deliverable in their capital programs in their P-100 document.

=== Certification ===
In 2019, buildingSMART international formed the COBie Certification Subcommittee composed of an international team of COBie experts (from US, UK, Ireland, China and Japan) to offer the COBie Certified Professional(TM) examination. This group published the COBie Educational Curriculum and began offering the COBie Certified Professional exam in 2020. This exam is a two-hour 160 question in-depth exam. To support those interested in sitting for this exam, bSI also introduced a program to evaluate and register educational programs whose courses addressed the content found in the COBie Educational Curriculum.

In 2020, buildingSMART international's COBie Certification Subcommittee prepared an introductory "Foundation" level exam. This exam covers the basic facts about the US COBie specification and is available for any bSI Chapter to implement. Unlike the COBie Certified Professional(TM) exam, bSI does require a completion of an authorized training program and the use of a common COBie "book of knowledge". The bSI authorized COBie book of knowledge was published in English in 2021. Translations to German, Portuguese, and Portuguese (Brazilian) are now underway.

buildingSMART International's COBie Certification Subcommittee considers this certification activities to be a transitional activity allowing bSI to support an increasingly widespread use of the US-specification while a future more widely acceptable and improved ISO-based replacement is produced.

== ISO replacement ==
In 2020, buildingSMART international began a project to replace the US-specification with an international standard. The project began by documenting the many lessons learned from the previous 15 years of use of the US specification and updated the original bSI Basic Facility Management Handover Model View Definition. By July 2020, this project had reached the approved activity proposal stage of the bSI standards process. A video about the purpose and content was also published. in 2021, after a delay of over a year due to a dispute regarding the naming rights of the future ISO, it was determined that bSI would no longer include the acronym COBie in its project.

With bSI no longer reliant on the previous US-specific name, its project has improved clarity, approach and scope. Given wide interest in delivering ISO-standards supporting many types of projects, not just buildings, bSI's strategic approach is to develop a set of ISO 16739 based specifications that will entirely replace the US specification (the project is called Facility Management Handover - Equipment Maintenance). The project goal is to directly support the handover of building equipment maintenance information while addressing references to objects outside of the building domain. For example, a potential future project, FM Handover - Tunnel Maintenance, would simply replace the IFC objects for buildings with those that describe maintainable items in the "Tunnel" domain. This strategy will also provide the ISO core for information uses needed not only for FM Handover but also for FM activities themselves. bSI planned to roll out this strategy in a series of position papers during 2022, and to enroll members in the project.
