= Macro BIM =

Macro BIM (Building Information Model) is a building information model, assembled of higher level building elements, used for macro level analysis including visualization, spatial validation, cost modeling/estimating, phasing/sequencing, energy performance, and risk.

Macro models are intended to be built quickly, facilitating rapid analysis of multiple concepts or ideas prior to launching into a more detailed in depth study of a preferred concept using "Micro BIM" applications.

Macro BIM authoring applications often utilize parametric variables and properties as well as inferencing capabilities to quickly build enough relevant data to facilitate analysis.
