= Cmdbuild =

Open source web enterprise environment

CMDBuild
- Developer: Tecnoteca srl
- Stable release: 4.1.0 / September 26, 2025
- Written in: Java and JavaScript
- Operating system: Cross-platform
- Available in: Multilingual
- Type: Asset management
- License: Affero_General_Public_License
- Website: www.cmdbuild.org/en/

CMDBuild is an open source web enterprise environment to configure custom applications for asset management.

== Usage ==
CMDBuild is a suite for the asset management. It is composed of:

- CMDBuild, a low code platform for the configuration of asset management applications;
- CMDBuild READY2USE, a solution for the IT Asset & Service Management, ITIL compliant;
- openMAINT, a solution for the Property and Facility Management and Maintenance Processes, lets you manage database of assets, like business resources, equipment leased to customers, technological infrastructure and systems.

== Notes and references ==
CMDBuild is an enterprise system: server-side Java, web Ajax GUI, SOA architecture (Service Oriented Architecture), based on webservice and implemented by using the best open source technologies and following the sector standards.

CMDBuild provides native mechanisms for the administrator and generates dynamically a web interface for the operators. It allows to:

- model the database (add new classes of items, new attributes and new relations, define filters, "views" and access permissions limited to rows and columns of every class);
- design workflows;
- design reports;
- configure dashboards;
- implement interoperability solutions with external applications and systems;
- schedule various operations (process starts, e-mail receiving and sending, connector executions), send notifications, start workflows and execute scripts;
- manage documents using the CMIS standard;
- schedule single or recurring deadlines;
- use GIS features to georeference and display assets on a geographical map;
- use BIM features to view 3D models (IFC format)

The system includes a REST webservice, so that CMDBuild users can implement custom interoperability solutions with external systems.

CMDBuild can be downloaded from SourceForge
