= Building information modeling =

Process for digital management of built assets

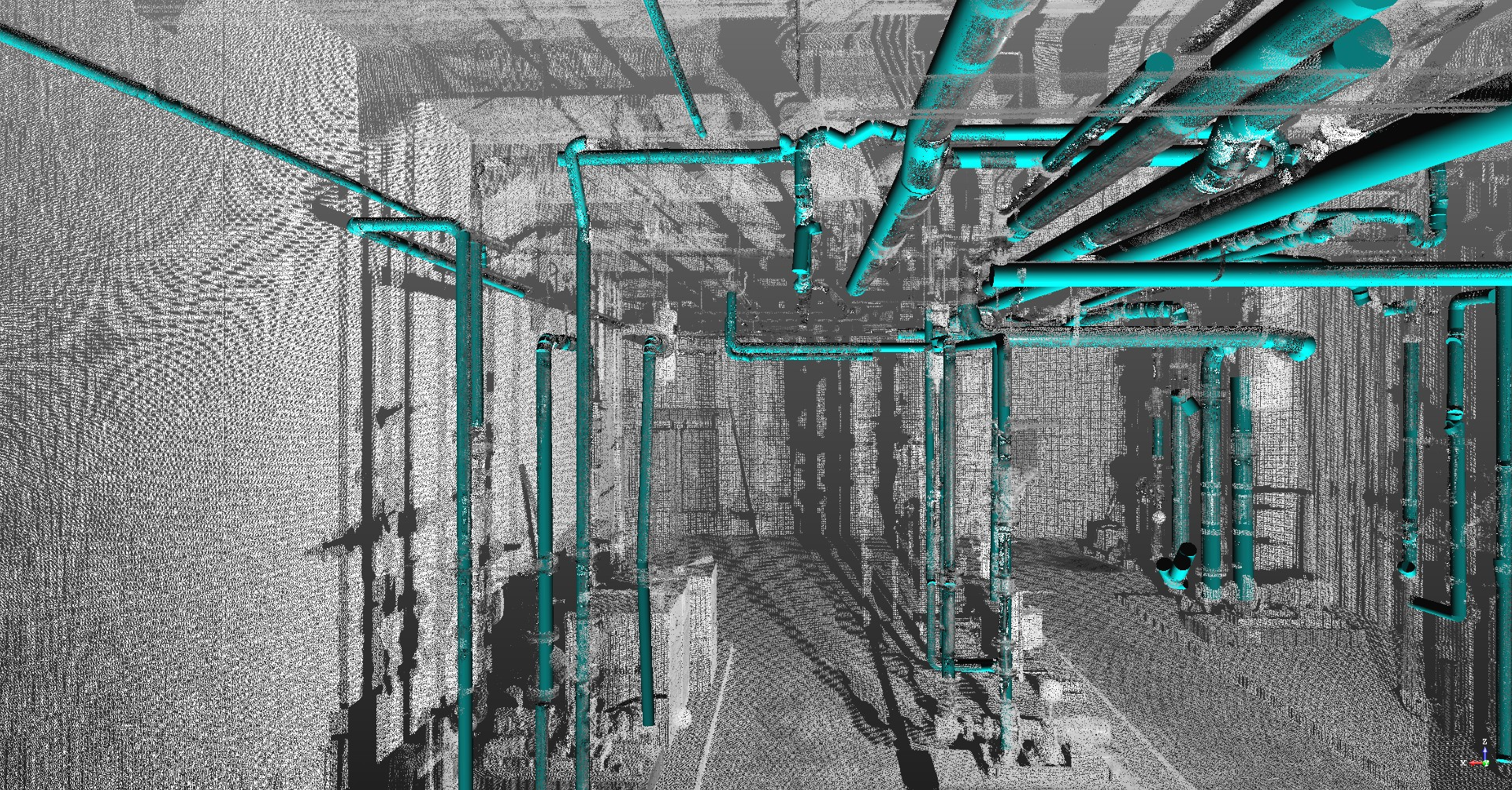
Building information model of a mechanical room developed from lidar data

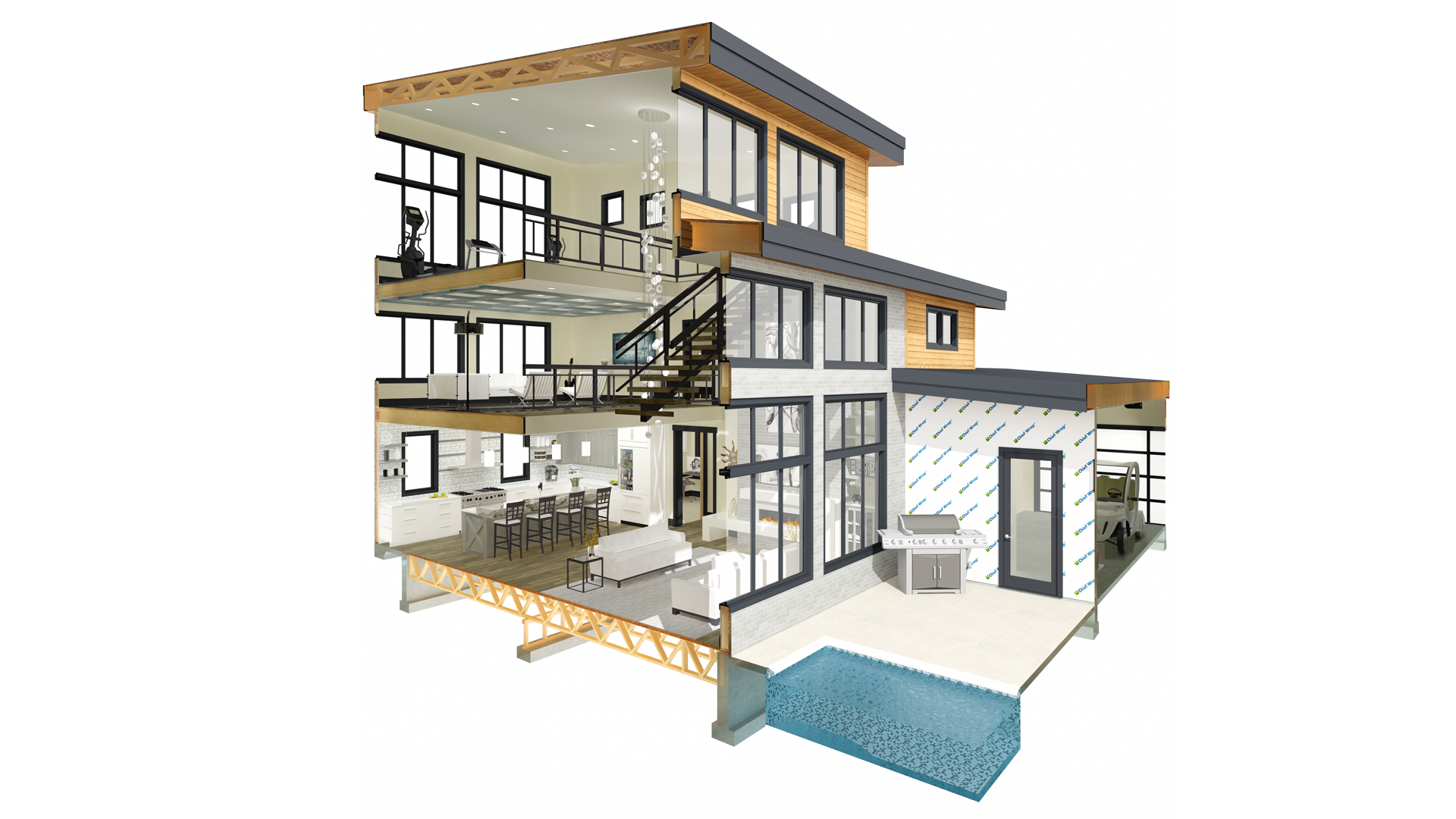
Chief Architect Software doing a section cut rendering

Building information modeling (BIM) is an approach involving the generation and management of digital representations of the physical and functional characteristics of buildings or other physical assets and facilities. BIM is supported by various tools, processes, technologies and contracts. Building information models (BIMs) are computer files (often but not always in proprietary formats and containing proprietary data) which can be extracted, exchanged or networked to support decision-making regarding a built asset. BIM software is used by individuals, businesses and government agencies who plan, design, construct, operate and maintain buildings and diverse physical infrastructures, such as water, refuse, electricity, gas, communication utilities, roads, railways, bridges, ports and tunnels.

The concept of BIM has been in development since the 1970s, but it only became an agreed term in the early 2000s. The development of standards and the adoption of BIM have progressed at different speeds in different countries. Developed by buildingSMART, Industry Foundation Classes (IFCs) data structures for representing information – became an international standard, ISO 16739, in 2013, and BIM process standards developed in the United Kingdom from 2007 onwards formed the basis of an international standard, ISO 19650, launched in December 2018.

== History ==
The first software tools developed for modeling buildings emerged in the late 1970s and early 1980s, and included workstation products such as Chuck Eastman's Building Description System and GLIDE, RUCAPS, Sonata, Reflex and Gable 4D Series. The early applications, and the hardware needed to run them, were expensive, which limited widespread adoption.

The pioneering role of applications such as RUCAPS, Sonata and Reflex has been recognized by Laiserin as well as the UK's Royal Academy of Engineering; former GMW employee Jonathan Ingram worked on all three products. What became known as BIM products differed from architectural drafting tools such as AutoCAD by allowing the addition of further information (time, cost, manufacturers' details, sustainability, and maintenance information, etc.) to the building model.

As Graphisoft had been developing such solutions for longer than its competitors, Laiserin regarded its ArchiCAD application as then "one of the most mature BIM solutions on the market." Following its launch in 1987, ArchiCAD became regarded by some as the first implementation of BIM, as it was the first CAD product on a personal computer able to create both 2D and 3D geometry, as well as the first commercial BIM product for personal computers. However, Graphisoft founder Gábor Bojár has acknowledged to Jonathan Ingram in an open letter, that Sonata "was more advanced in 1986 than ArchiCAD at that time", adding that it "surpassed already the matured definition of 'BIM' specified only about one and a half decade later".

The term 'building model' (in the sense of BIM as used today) was first used in papers in the mid-1980s: in a 1985 paper by Simon Ruffle eventually published in 1986, and later in a 1986 paper by Robert Aish – then at GMW Computers Ltd, developer of RUCAPS software – referring to the software's use at London's Heathrow Airport. The term 'Building Information Model' first appeared in a 1992 paper by G.A. van Nederveen and F. P. Tolman.

However, the terms 'Building Information Model' and 'Building Information Modeling' (including the acronym "BIM") did not become popularly used until some 10 years later. Facilitating exchange and interoperability of information in digital format was variously with differing terminology: by Graphisoft as "Virtual Building" or "Single Building Model", Bentley Systems as "Integrated Project Models", and by Autodesk or Vectorworks as "Building Information Modeling". In 2002, Autodesk released a white paper entitled "Building Information Modeling," and other software vendors also started to assert their involvement in the field. By hosting contributions from Autodesk, Bentley Systems and Graphisoft, plus other industry observers, in 2003, Jerry Laiserin helped popularize and standardize the term as a common name for the digital representation of the building process.

=== Interoperability and BIM standards ===
As some BIM software developers have created proprietary data structures in their software, data and files created by one vendor's applications may not work in other vendor solutions. To achieve interoperability between applications, neutral, non-proprietary or open standards for sharing BIM data among different software applications have been developed.

Poor software interoperability has long been regarded as an obstacle to industry efficiency in general and to BIM adoption in particular. In August 2004 a US National Institute of Standards and Technology (NIST) report conservatively estimated that $15.8 billion was lost annually by the U.S. capital facilities industry due to inadequate interoperability arising from "the highly fragmented nature of the industry, the industry's continued paper-based business practices, a lack of standardization, and inconsistent technology adoption among stakeholders".

An early BIM standard was the CIMSteel Integration Standard, CIS/2, a product model and data exchange file format for structural steel project information (CIMsteel: Computer Integrated Manufacturing of Constructional Steelwork). CIS/2 enables seamless and integrated information exchange during the design and construction of steel framed structures. It was developed by the University of Leeds and the UK's Steel Construction Institute in the late 1990s, with inputs from Georgia Tech, and was approved by the American Institute of Steel Construction as its data exchange format for structural steel in 2000.

BIM is often associated with Industry Foundation Classes (IFCs) and aecXML – data structures for representing information – developed by buildingSMART. IFC is recognised by the ISO and has been an international standard, ISO 16739, since 2013. OpenBIM is an initiative by buildingSMART that promotes open standards and interoperability. Based on the IFC standard, it allows vendor-neutral BIM data exchange. OpenBIM standards also include BIM Collaboration Format (BCF) for issue tracking and Information Delivery Specification (IDS) for defining model requirements.

Construction Operations Building information exchange (COBie) is also associated with BIM. COBie was devised by Bill East of the United States Army Corps of Engineers in 2007, and helps capture and record equipment lists, product data sheets, warranties, spare parts lists, and preventive maintenance schedules. This information is used to support operations, maintenance and asset management once a built asset is in service. In December 2011, it was approved by the US-based National Institute of Building Sciences as part of its National Building Information Model (NBIMS-US) standard. COBie has been incorporated into software, and may take several forms including spreadsheet, IFC, and ifcXML. In early 2013 BuildingSMART was working on a lightweight XML format, COBieLite, which became available for review in April 2013. In September 2014, a code of practice regarding COBie was issued as a British Standard: BS 1192-4.

In January 2019, ISO published the first two parts of ISO 19650, providing a framework for building information modelling, based on process standards developed in the United Kingdom. UK BS and PAS 1192 specifications formed the basis of further parts of the ISO 19650 series, with Part 3 (asset management) and Part 5 (security management) published in 2020; Part 4 (information exchange) followed in 2022 and Part 6 (health and safety) in 2025. Parts 1-3 were subject to review from 2024, and proposed amendments (a Draft Information Standard, DIS) for parts 1 and 2 were published in early March 2026, with amendments for part 3 following in June 2026.

The IEC/ISO 81346 series for reference designation has published 81346-12:2018, also known as RDS-CW (Reference Designation System for Construction Works). The use of RDS-CW offers the prospect of integrating BIM with complementary international standards based classification systems being developed for the Power Plant sector.

== Definition ==
ISO 19650-1:2018 defines BIM as:

use of a shared digital representation of a built asset ... to facilitate design, construction and operation processes to form a reliable basis for decisions.

The US National Building Information Model Standard Project Committee has the following definition:

Building Information Modeling (BIM) is a digital representation of physical and functional characteristics of a facility. A BIM is a shared knowledge resource for information about a facility forming a reliable basis for decisions during its life-cycle; defined as existing from earliest conception to demolition.

Traditional building design was largely reliant upon two-dimensional technical drawings (plans, elevations, sections, etc.). Building information modeling extends the three primary spatial dimensions (width, height and depth), incorporating information about time (so-called 4D BIM), cost (5D BIM), asset management, sustainability, etc. BIM therefore covers more than just geometry. It also covers spatial relationships, geospatial information, quantities and properties of building components (for example, manufacturers' details), and enables a wide range of collaborative processes relating to the built asset from initial planning through to construction and then throughout its operational life.

BIM authoring tools present a design as combinations of "objects" – vague and undefined, generic or product-specific, solid shapes or void-space oriented (like the shape of a room), that carry their geometry, relations, and attributes. BIM applications allow extraction of different views from a building model for drawing production and other uses. These different views are automatically consistent, being based on a single definition of each object instance. BIM software also defines objects parametrically; that is, the objects are defined as parameters and relations to other objects so that if a related object is amended, dependent ones will automatically also change. Each model element can carry attributes for selecting and ordering them automatically, providing cost estimates as well as material tracking and ordering.

For the professionals involved in a project, BIM enables a virtual information model to be shared by the design team (architects, landscape architects, surveyors, civil, structural and building services engineers, etc.), main contractor, subcontractors and the owner/operator. Each professional adds discipline-specific data to the shared model – commonly, a 'federated' model which combines several different disciplines' models into one. Combining models enables visualisation of all models in a single environment, better coordination and development of designs, enhanced clash avoidance and detection, and improved time and cost decision-making.

=== 'BIM wash' ===
"BIM wash" or "BIM washing" is a term sometimes used to describe inflated, and/or deceptive, claims of using or delivering BIM services or products.

== Usage throughout the asset life cycle ==
Use of BIM goes beyond the planning and design phase of a project, extending throughout the life cycle of the asset. The supporting processes of building lifecycle management include cost management, construction management, project management, facility operation and application in green building.

=== Common Data Environment ===
A 'Common Data Environment' (CDE) is defined in ISO 19650 as an:

Agreed source of information for any given project or asset, for collecting, managing and disseminating each information container through a managed process.

A CDE workflow describes the processes to be used while a CDE solution can provide the underlying technologies. A CDE is used to share data across a project or asset lifecycle, supporting collaboration across a whole project team. The concept of a CDE overlaps with enterprise content management, ECM, but with a greater focus on BIM issues.

=== Management of building information models ===
Building information models span the whole concept-to-occupation time-span. To ensure efficient management of information processes throughout this span, a BIM manager might be appointed. The BIM manager is retained by a design build team on the client's behalf from the pre-design phase onwards to develop and to track the object-oriented BIM against predicted and measured performance objectives, supporting multi-disciplinary building information models that drive analysis, schedules, take-off and logistics. BIMs were also developed to different levels of development (LOD) (sometimes also called levels of detail) reflecting the relevant levels of detailing needed from early to later stages of a project. The 2018 publication of ISO 19650-1 then introduced the concept of Level of Information Need (LOIN), standardised in 2024 in ISO 7817-1:2024.

=== BIM in construction management ===
Participants in the building process are constantly challenged to deliver successful projects despite tight budgets, limited staffing, accelerated schedules, and limited or conflicting information. The significant disciplines such as architectural, structural and MEP designs should be well-coordinated, as two things can't take place at the same place and time. BIM additionally is able to aid in collision detection, identifying the exact location of discrepancies.

The BIM concept envisages virtual construction of a facility prior to its actual physical construction, in order to reduce uncertainty, improve safety, work out problems, and simulate and analyze potential impacts. Sub-contractors from every trade can input critical information into the model before beginning construction, with opportunities to pre-fabricate or pre-assemble some systems off-site. Waste can be minimised on-site and products delivered on a just-in-time basis rather than being stock-piled on-site.

Quantities and shared properties of materials can be extracted easily. Scopes of work can be isolated and defined. Systems, assemblies and sequences can be shown in a relative scale with the entire facility or group of facilities. BIM also prevents errors by enabling conflict or 'clash detection' whereby the computer model visually highlights to the team where parts of the building (e.g.:structural frame and building services pipes or ducts) may wrongly intersect.

=== BIM in facility operation and asset management ===
BIM can bridge the information loss associated with handing a project from design team, to construction team and to building owner/operator, by allowing each group to add to and reference back to all information they acquire during their period of contribution to the BIM model. Enabling an effective handover of information from design and construction (including via IFC or COBie) can thus yield benefits to the facility owner or operator. BIM-related processes relating to longer-term asset management are also covered in ISO-19650 Part 3.

For example, a building owner may find evidence of a water leak in a building. Rather than exploring the physical building, the owner may turn to the model and see that a water valve is located in the suspect location. The owner could also have in the model the specific valve size, manufacturer, part number, and any other information ever researched in the past, pending adequate computing power. Such problems were initially addressed by Leite and Akinci when developing a vulnerability representation of facility contents and threats for supporting the identification of vulnerabilities in building emergencies.

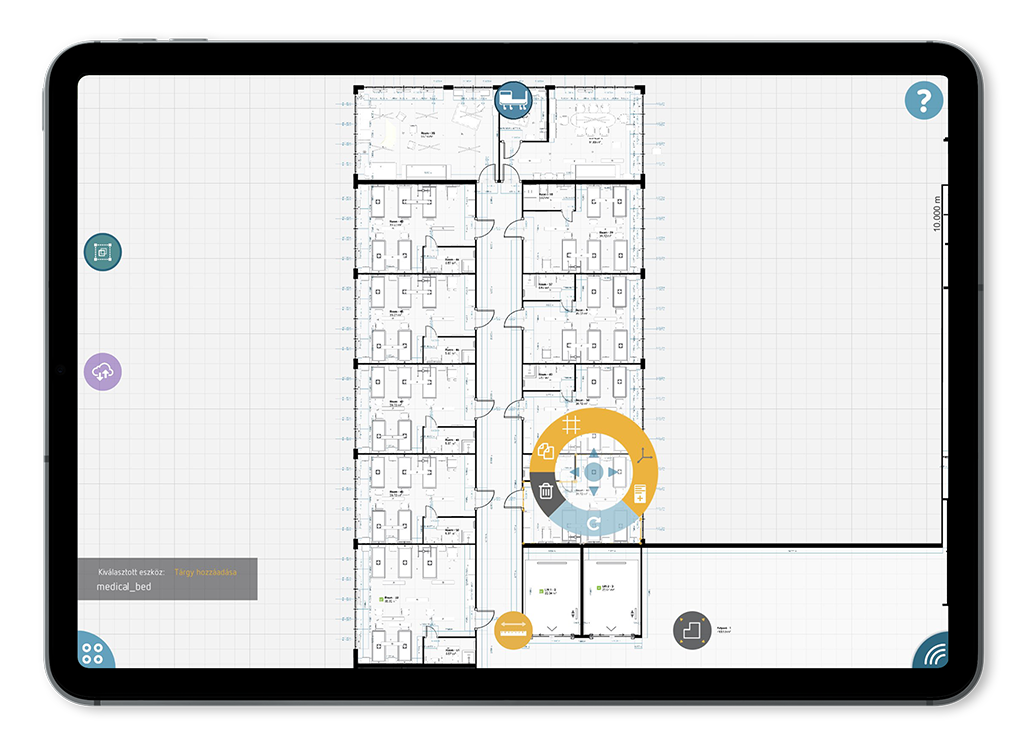
Operational BIM 2D floor plan view in a mobile device

Dynamic information about the building, such as sensor measurements and control signals from the building systems, can also be incorporated within software to support analysis of building operation and maintenance. As such, BIM in facility operation can be related to internet of things approaches; rapid access to data may also be aided by use of mobile devices (smartphones, tablets) and machine-readable RFID tags or barcodes; while integration and interoperability with other business systems - CAFM, ERP, BMS, IWMS, etc - can aid operational reuse of data.

There have been attempts at creating information models for older, pre-existing facilities. Approaches include referencing key metrics such as the Facility Condition Index (FCI), or using 3D laser-scanning surveys and photogrammetry techniques (separately or in combination) or digitizing traditional building surveying methodologies by using mobile technology to capture accurate measurements and operation-related information about the asset that can be used as the basis for a model. Trying to retrospectively model a building constructed in, say 1927, requires numerous assumptions about design standards, building codes, construction methods, materials, etc, and is, therefore, more complex than building a model during design.

One of the challenges to the proper maintenance and management of existing facilities is understanding how BIM can be utilized to support a holistic understanding and implementation of building management practices and "cost of ownership" principles that support the full product lifecycle of a building. An American National Standard entitled APPA 1000 – Total Cost of Ownership for Facilities Asset Management incorporates BIM to factor in a variety of critical requirements and costs over the life-cycle of the building, including but not limited to: replacement of energy, utility, and safety systems; continual maintenance of the building exterior and interior and replacement of materials; updates to design and functionality; and recapitalization costs.

=== BIM in green building ===
BIM in green building, or "green BIM", is a process that can help architecture, engineering and construction firms to improve sustainability in the built environment. It can allow architects and engineers to integrate and analyze environmental issues in their design over the life cycle of the asset. In the ERANet projects EPC4SES and FinSESCo projects worked on the digital representation of the energy demand of the building. The nucleus is the XML from issuing Energy Performance Certificates, amended by roof data to be able to retrieve the position and size of PV or PV/T.

== International developments ==
=== Asia ===
==== China ====
China began its exploration on informatisation in 2001. The Ministry of Construction announced BIM was the key application technology of informatisation in "Ten new technologies of construction industry" (by 2010). The Ministry of Science and Technology (MOST) clearly announced BIM technology as a national key research and application project in "12th Five-Year" Science and Technology Development Planning. Therefore, the year 2011 was described as "The First Year of China's BIM".

==== Hong Kong ====
In 2006 the Hong Kong Housing Authority introduced BIM, and then set a target of full BIM implementation in 2014/2015. BuildingSmart Hong Kong was inaugurated in Hong Kong SAR in late April 2012. The Government of Hong Kong mandates the use of BIM for all government projects over HK$30M since 1 January 2018.

==== India ====
India Building Information Modelling Association (IBIMA) is a national-level society that represents the entire Indian BIM community. In India BIM is also known as VDC: Virtual Design and Construction. Due to its population and economic growth, India has an expanding construction market. In spite of this, BIM usage was reported by only 22% of respondents in a 2014 survey. In 2019, government officials said BIM could help save up to 20% by shortening construction time, and urged wider adoption by infrastructure ministries.

==== Iran ====
The Iran Building Information Modeling Association (IBIMA) was founded in 2012 by professional engineers from five universities in Iran, including the Civil and Environmental Engineering Department at Amirkabir University of Technology. While it is not currently active, IBIMA aims to share knowledge resources to support construction engineering management decision-making.

==== Malaysia ====
BIM implementation is targeted towards BIM Stage 2 by the year 2020 led by the Construction Industry Development Board (CIDB Malaysia). Under the Construction Industry Transformation Plan (CITP 2016–2020), it is hoped more emphasis on technology adoption across the project life-cycle will induce higher productivity.

==== Singapore ====
The Building and Construction Authority (BCA) has announced that BIM would be introduced for architectural submission (by 2013), structural and M&E submissions (by 2014) and eventually for plan submissions of all projects with gross floor area of more than 5,000 square meters by 2015. The BCA Academy is training students in BIM.

==== Japan ====
The Ministry of Land, Infrastructure and Transport (MLIT) has announced "Start of BIM pilot project in government building and repairs" (by 2010). Japan Institute of Architects (JIA) released the BIM guidelines (by 2012), which showed the agenda and expected effect of BIM to architects. MLIT announced " BIM will be mandated for all of its public works from the fiscal year of 2023, except those having particular reasons". The works subject to WTO Government Procurement Agreement shall comply with the published ISO standards related to BIM such as ISO19650 series as determined by the Article 10 (Technical Specification) of the Agreement.

==== South Korea ====
Small BIM-related seminars and independent BIM effort existed in South Korea even in the 1990s. However, it was not until the late 2000s that the Korean industry paid attention to BIM. The first industry-level BIM conference was held in April 2008, after which, BIM has been spread very rapidly. Since 2010, the Korean government has been gradually increasing the scope of BIM-mandated projects. McGraw Hill published a detailed report in 2012 on the status of BIM adoption and implementation in South Korea.

==== United Arab Emirates ====
Dubai Municipality issued a circular (196) in 2014 mandating BIM use for buildings of a certain size, height or type. The one page circular initiated strong interest in BIM and the market responded in preparation for more guidelines and direction. In 2015 the Municipality issued another circular (207) titled 'Regarding the expansion of applying the (BIM) on buildings and facilities in the emirate of Dubai' which made BIM mandatory on more projects by reducing the minimum size and height requirement for projects requiring BIM. This second circular drove BIM adoption further with several projects and organizations adopting UK BIM standards as best practice. In 2016, the UAE's Quality and Conformity Commission set up a BIM steering group to investigate statewide adoption of BIM.

=== Europe ===
==== Austria ====
Austrian standards for digital modeling are summarized in the ÖNORM A 6241, published on 15 March 2015. The ÖNORM A 6241-1 (BIM Level 2), which replaced the ÖNORM A 6240-4, has been extended in the detailed and executive design stages, and corrected in the lack of definitions. The ÖNORM A 6241-2 (BIM Level 3) includes all the requirements for the BIM Level 3 (iBIM).

==== Czech Republic ====
The Czech BIM Council, established in May 2011, aims to implement BIM methodologies into the Czech building and designing processes, education, standards and legislation.

==== Estonia ====
In Estonia digital construction cluster (Digitaalehituse Klaster) was formed in 2015 to develop BIM solutions for the whole life-cycle of construction. The strategic objective of the cluster is to develop an innovative digital construction environment as well as VDC new product development, Grid and e-construction portal to increase the international competitiveness and sales of Estonian businesses in the construction field. The cluster is equally co-funded by European Structural and Investment Funds through Enterprise Estonia and by the members of the cluster with a total budget of 600 000 euros for the period 2016–2018.

==== France ====
The French arm of buildingSMART, called Mediaconstruct (existing since 1989), is supporting digital transformation in France. A building transition digital plan – French acronym PTNB – was created in 2013 (mandated since 2015 to 2017 and under several ministries). A 2013 survey of European BIM practice showed France in last place, but, with government support, in 2017 it had risen to third place with more than 30% of real estate projects carried out using BIM. PTNB was superseded in 2018 by Plan BIM 2022, administered by an industry body, the Association for the Development of Digital in Construction (AND Construction), founded in 2017, and supported by a digital platform, KROQI, developed and launched in 2017 by CSTB (France's Scientific and Technical Centre for Building).

==== Germany ====
In December 2015, the German minister for transport Alexander Dobrindt announced a timetable for the introduction of mandatory BIM for German road and rail projects from the end of 2020. Speaking in April 2016, he said digital design and construction must become standard for construction projects in Germany, with Germany two to three years behind The Netherlands and the UK in aspects of implementing BIM. BIM was piloted in many areas of German infrastructure delivery and in July 2022 Volker Wissing, Federal Minister for Digital and Transport, announced that, from 2025, BIM will be used as standard in the construction of federal trunk roads in addition to the rail sector.

==== Ireland ====
In November 2017, Ireland's Department for Public Expenditure and Reform launched a strategy to increase use of digital technology in delivery of key public works projects, requiring the use of BIM to be phased in over the next four years.

==== Italy ====
Through the new D.l. 50, in April 2016 Italy has included into its own legislation several European directives including 2014/24/EU on Public Procurement. The decree states among the main goals of public procurement the "rationalization of designing activities and of all connected verification processes, through the progressive adoption of digital methods and electronic instruments such as Building and Infrastructure Information Modelling". A norm in 8 parts is also being written to support the transition: UNI 11337-1, UNI 11337-4 and UNI 11337-5 were published in January 2017, with five further chapters to follow within a year.

In early 2018 the Italian Ministry of Infrastructure and Transport issued a decree (DM 01/12/17) creating a governmental BIM Mandate compelling public client organisations to adopt a digital approach by 2025, with an incremental obligation which will start on 1 January 2019.

==== Lithuania ====
Lithuania is moving towards adoption of BIM infrastructure by founding a public body "Skaitmeninė statyba" (Digital Construction), which is managed by 13 associations. Also, there is a BIM work group established by Lietuvos Architektų Sąjunga (a Lithuanian architects body). The initiative intends Lithuania to adopt BIM, Industry Foundation Classes (IFC) and National Construction Classification as standard. An international conference "Skaitmeninė statyba Lietuvoje" (Digital Construction in Lithuania) has been held annually since 2012.

==== The Netherlands ====
On 1 November 2011, the Rijksgebouwendienst, the agency within the Dutch Ministry of Housing, Spatial Planning and the Environment that manages government buildings, introduced the Rgd BIM Standard, which it updated on 1 July 2012.

==== Norway ====
In Norway BIM has been used increasingly since 2008. Several large public clients require use of BIM in open formats (IFC) in most or all of their projects. The Government Building Authority bases its processes on BIM in open formats to increase process speed and quality, and all large and several small and medium-sized contractors use BIM. National BIM development is centred around the local organisation, buildingSMART Norway which represents 25% of the Norwegian construction industry.

==== Poland ====
BIMKlaster (BIM Cluster) is a non-governmental, non-profit organisation established in 2012 with the aim of promoting BIM development in Poland. In September 2016, the Ministry of Infrastructure and Construction began a series of expert meetings concerning the application of BIM methodologies in the construction industry.

==== Portugal ====
Created in 2015 to promote the adoption of BIM in Portugal and its normalisation, the Technical Committee for BIM Standardisation, CT197-BIM, has created the first strategic document for construction 4.0 in Portugal, aiming to align the country's industry around a common vision, integrated and more ambitious than a simple technology change.

==== Russia ====
The Russian government has approved a list of the regulations that provide the creation of a legal framework for the use of information modeling of buildings in construction and encourages the use of BIM in government projects.

==== Slovakia ====
The BIM Association of Slovakia, "BIMaS", was established in January 2013 as the first Slovak professional organisation focused on BIM. Although there are neither standards nor legislative requirements to deliver projects in BIM, many architects, structural engineers and contractors, plus a few investors are already applying BIM. A Slovak implementation strategy created by BIMaS and supported by the Chamber of Civil Engineers and Chamber of Architects has yet to be approved by Slovak authorities due to their low interest in such innovation.

==== Spain ====
A July 2015 meeting at Spain's Ministry of Infrastructure [Ministerio de Fomento] launched the country's national BIM strategy, making BIM a mandatory requirement on public sector projects with a possible starting date of 2018. Following a February 2015 BIM summit in Barcelona, professionals in Spain established a BIM commission (ITeC) to drive the adoption of BIM in Catalonia.

==== Switzerland ====
Since 2009 through the initiative of buildingSmart Switzerland, then 2013, BIM awareness among a broader community of engineers and architects was raised due to the open competition for Basel's Felix Platter Hospital where a BIM coordinator was sought. BIM has also been a subject of events by the Swiss Society for Engineers and Architects, SIA.

==== United Kingdom ====
In May 2011 UK Government Chief Construction Adviser Paul Morrell called for BIM adoption on UK government construction projects. Morrell also told construction professionals to adopt BIM or be "Betamaxed out". In June 2011 the UK government published its BIM strategy, announcing its intention to require collaborative 3D BIM (with all project and asset information, documentation and data being electronic) on its projects by 2016. Initially, compliance would require building data to be delivered in a vendor-neutral 'COBie' format, thus overcoming the limited interoperability of BIM software suites available on the market. The UK Government BIM Task Group led the government's BIM programme and requirements, including a free-to-use set of UK standards and tools that defined 'level 2 BIM'. In April 2016, the UK Government published a new central web portal as a point of reference for the industry for 'level 2 BIM'. The work of the BIM Task Group then continued under the stewardship of the Cambridge-based Centre for Digital Built Britain (CDBB), announced in December 2017 and formally launched in early 2018.

Outside of government, industry adoption of BIM since 2016 has been led by the UK BIM Alliance, an independent, not-for-profit, collaboratively-based organisation formed to champion and enable the implementation of BIM, and to connect and represent organisations, groups and individuals working towards digital transformation of the UK's built environment industry. In November 2017, the UK BIM Alliance merged with the UK and Ireland chapter of BuildingSMART. In October 2019, CDBB, the UK BIM Alliance (since October 2022, known as 'nima') and the BSI Group launched the UK BIM Framework. Superseding the BIM levels approach, the framework describes an overarching approach to implementing BIM in the UK, giving free guidance on integrating the international ISO 19650 series of standards into UK processes and practice. The CDBB closed in March 2022.

National Building Specification (NBS) has published research into BIM adoption in the UK since 2011, and in 2020 published its 10th annual BIM report. In 2011, 43% of respondents had not heard of BIM; in 2020 73% said they were using BIM.

=== North America ===
==== Canada ====
BIM is not mandatory in Canada. Several organizations support BIM adoption and implementation in Canada: the Canada BIM Council (CANBIM, founded in 2008), the Institute for BIM in Canada, and buildingSMART Canada (the Canadian chapter of buildingSMART International). Public Services and Procurement Canada (formerly Public Works and Government Services Canada) is committed to using non-proprietary or "OpenBIM" BIM standards and avoids specifying any specific proprietary BIM format. Designers are required to use the international standards of interoperability for BIM (IFC).

==== United States ====
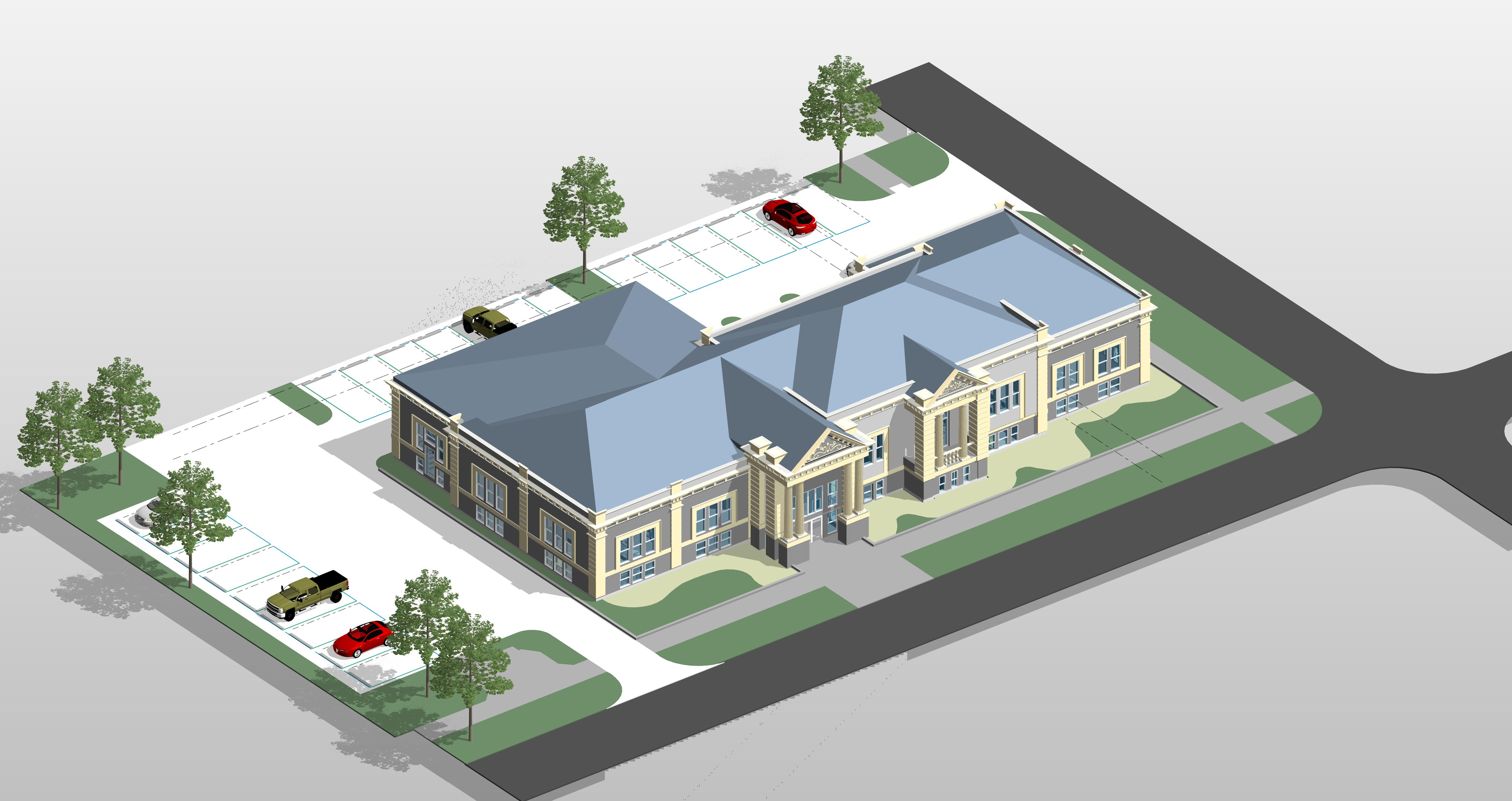
Architectural BIM Modeling of Clinton Public Library, USA

The Associated General Contractors of America and US contracting firms have developed various working definitions of BIM that describe it generally as:

an object-oriented building development tool that utilizes 5-D modeling concepts, information technology and software interoperability to design, construct and operate a building project, as well as communicate its details.

Although the concept of BIM and relevant processes are being explored by contractors, architects and developers alike, the term itself has been questioned and debated with alternatives including Virtual Building Environment (VBE) also considered. Unlike some countries such as the UK, the US has not adopted a set of national BIM guidelines, allowing different systems to remain in competition. In 2021, the National Institute of Building Sciences (NIBS) looked at applying UK BIM experiences to developing shared US BIM standards and processes. The US National BIM Standard had largely been developed through volunteer efforts; NIBS aimed to create a national BIM programme to drive effective adoption at a national scale.

BIM is seen to be closely related to Integrated Project Delivery (IPD) where the primary motive is to bring the teams together early on in the project. A full implementation of BIM also requires the project teams to collaborate from the inception stage and formulate model sharing and ownership contract documents.

The American Institute of Architects has defined BIM as "a model-based technology linked with a database of project information", and this reflects the general reliance on database technology as the foundation. In the future, structured text documents such as specifications may be able to be searched and linked to regional, national, and international standards.

=== Africa ===
==== Nigeria ====
BIM has the potential to play a vital role in the Nigerian AEC sector. In addition to its potential clarity and transparency, it may help promote standardization across the industry. For instance, Utiome suggests that, in conceptualizing a BIM-based knowledge transfer framework from industrialized economies to urban construction projects in developing nations, generic BIM objects can benefit from rich building information within specification parameters in product libraries, and used for efficient, streamlined design and construction. Similarly, an assessment of the current 'state of the art' by Kori found that medium and large firms were leading the adoption of BIM in the industry. Smaller firms were less advanced with respect to process and policy adherence. There has been little adoption of BIM in the built environment due to construction industry resistance to changes or new ways of doing things. The industry is still working with conventional 2D CAD systems in services and structural designs, although production could be in 3D systems. There is virtually no utilisation of 4D and 5D systems.

BIM Africa Initiative, primarily based in Nigeria, is a non-profit institute advocating the adoption of BIM across Africa. Since 2018, it has been engaging with professionals and the government towards the digital transformation of the built industry. Produced annually by its research and development committee, the African BIM Report gives an overview of BIM adoption across the African continent.

==== South Africa ====
The South African BIM Institute, established in May 2015, aims to enable technical experts to discuss digital construction solutions that can be adopted by professionals working within the construction sector. Its initial task was to promote the SA BIM Protocol.

There are no mandated or national best practice BIM standards or protocols in South Africa. Organisations implement company-specific BIM standards and protocols at best (there are isolated examples of cross-industry alliances).

=== Oceania ===
==== Australia ====
In February 2016, Infrastructure Australia recommended: "Governments should make the use of Building Information Modelling (BIM) mandatory for the design of large-scale complex infrastructure projects. In support of a mandatory rollout, the Australian Government should commission the Australasian Procurement and Construction Council, working with industry, to develop appropriate guidance around the adoption and use of BIM; and common standards and protocols to be applied when using BIM".

==== New Zealand ====
In 2015, many projects in the rebuilding of Christchurch were being assembled in detail on a computer using BIM well before workers set foot on the site. The New Zealand government started a BIM acceleration committee, as part of a productivity partnership with the goal of 20 per cent more efficiency in the construction industry by 2020. Today, BIM use is still not mandated in the country while several challenges have been identified for its implementation in the country. However, members of the AEC industry and academia have developed a national BIM handbook providing definitions, case studies and templates.

== Purposes or dimensionality ==
Some purposes or uses of BIM may be described as 'dimensions'. However, there is little consensus on definitions beyond 5D. Some organisations dismiss the term; for example, the UK Institution of Structural Engineers does not recommend using nD modelling terms beyond 4D, adding "cost (5D) is not really a 'dimension'."

=== 3D ===
3D BIM, an acronym for three-dimensional building information modeling, refers to the graphical representation of an asset's geometric design, augmented by information describing attributes of individual components. 3D BIM work may be undertaken by professional disciplines such as architectural, structural, and MEP, and the use of 3D models enhances coordination and collaboration between disciplines. A 3D virtual model can also be created by creating a point cloud of the building or facility using laser scanning technology.

=== 4D ===
4D BIM Construction Simulation

4D BIM, an acronym for 4-dimensional building information modeling, refers to the intelligent linking of individual 3D CAD components or assemblies with time- or scheduling-related information. The term 4D refers to the fourth dimension: time, i.e. 3D plus time.

4D modelling enables project participants (architects, designers, contractors, clients) to plan, sequence the physical activities, visualise the critical path of a series of events, mitigate the risks, report and monitor progress of activities through the lifetime of the project. 4D BIM enables a sequence of events to be depicted visually on a time line that has been populated by a 3D model, augmenting traditional Gantt charts and critical path (CPM) schedules often used in project management. Construction sequences can be reviewed as a series of problems using 4D BIM, enabling users to explore options, manage solutions and optimize results.

As an advanced construction management technique, it has been used by project delivery teams working on larger projects. 4D BIM has traditionally been used for higher end projects due to the associated costs, but technologies are now emerging that allow the process to be used by laymen or to drive processes such as manufacture.

=== 5D ===
5D BIM, an acronym for 5-dimensional building information modeling, refers to the intelligent linking of individual 3D components or assemblies with time schedule (4D BIM) constraints and then with cost-related information. 5D models enable participants to visualise construction progress and related costs over time. This BIM-centric project management technique has potential to improve management and delivery of projects of any size or complexity.

In June 2016, McKinsey & Company identified 5D BIM technology as one of five big ideas poised to disrupt construction. It defined 5D BIM as "a five-dimensional representation of the physical and functional characteristics of any project. It considers a project's time schedule and cost in addition to the standard spatial design parameters in 3-D."

=== 6D ===
6D BIM, an acronym for 6-dimensional building information modeling, is sometimes used to refer to the intelligent linking of individual 3D components or assemblies with all aspects of project life-cycle management information. However, there is less consensus about the definition of 6D BIM; it is also sometimes used to cover use of BIM for sustainability purposes.

In the project life cycle context, a 6D model is usually delivered to the owner when a construction project is finished. The "As-Built" BIM model is populated with relevant building component information such as product data and details, maintenance/operation manuals, cut sheet specifications, photos, warranty data, web links to product online sources, manufacturer information and contacts, etc. This database is made accessible to the users/owners through a customized proprietary web-based environment. This is intended to aid facilities managers in the operation and maintenance of the facility.

The term is less commonly used in the UK and has been replaced with reference to the Asset Information Requirements (AIR) and an Asset Information Model (AIM) as specified in BS EN ISO 19650-3:2020.

== See also ==
- Data model
- Design computing
- Digital twin (the physical manifestation instrumented and connected to the model)
- GIS
- Digital Building Logbook
- Lean construction
- List of BIM software
- Macro BIM
- Open-source architecture
- Open-source 3D file formats
- OpenStreetMap
- Pre-fire planning
- System information modelling
- Whole Building Design Guide
- Xeokit - open-source JavaScript software development kit (SDK) for rendering 3D graphics in web browsers for BIM
