= ISO 19650 =

Information management standard

ISO 19650 is a family of international standards for information management using building information modelling (BIM) across the life cycle of built assets. The series sets out concepts, roles and processes for specifying, producing, exchanging, checking and securing information, and is widely used alongside national implementation guidance such as the UK BIM Framework.

The series has six parts: Part 1 (concepts and principles), Part 2 (delivery phase of assets), Part 3 (operational phase of assets), Part 4 (information exchange), Part 5 (security-minded information management) and Part 6 (health and safety information). Parts 1 and 2 were first published in 2018; Part 3 in 2020; Part 4 in 2022; Part 5 in 2020; and Part 6 in 2025.

== History ==
The ISO 19650 series was developed by ISO/TC 59/SC 13 as an internationalization of earlier UK specifications (notably the PAS 1192 series). ISO announced the first parts in January 2019. Subsequent parts have expanded coverage to information exchanges, security and the management of health and safety information.

Parts 1-3 of ISO 19650 were subject to review from 2024, and proposed amendments (a Draft Information Standard, DIS) for parts 1 and 2 are due to be published in early March 2026, with amendments for part 3 scheduled for June 2026.

== Scope and structure ==
=== Part 1: Concepts and principles (ISO 19650-1:2018) ===
Part 1 defines core concepts, terms and principles, including information requirements, roles and the information delivery cycle. It sets out high-level expectations for a common data environment (CDE), status codes and approval processes.

=== Part 2: Delivery phase of assets (ISO 19650-2:2018) ===
Part 2 specifies information management requirements and processes during design and construction. It introduces artefacts such as the BIM Execution Plan (BEP), Master Information Delivery Plan (MIDP) and Task Information Delivery Plans (TIDPs), and aligns appointments and tendering with information requirements.

=== Part 3: Operational phase of assets (ISO 19650-3:2020) ===
Part 3 focuses on information management during operation, maintenance and refurbishment. It describes how a Project Information Model (PIM) transitions to an Asset Information Model (AIM) and addresses trigger events for updating information.

=== Part 4: Information exchange (ISO 19650-4:2022) ===
Part 4 sets out detailed process and decision criteria for information exchanges to ensure the quality of project and asset information models. It complements Parts 1–3 by defining exchange roles, verification and acceptance criteria. For background, see also the public preview of the published text.

=== Part 5: Security-minded information management (ISO 19650-5:2020) ===
Part 5 specifies principles and requirements for security-minded information management, including classification and controls for sensitive information associated with assets, projects, products or services. ISO highlighted the standard's role in embedding security into BIM information management on publication in June 2020.

=== Part 6: Health and safety information (ISO 19650-6:2025) ===
Part 6 specifies requirements for collaboratively classifying, sharing and delivering health and safety information throughout project and asset life cycles. It aligns with the processes in Parts 2 and 3 and supports “golden thread” information management in higher-risk buildings. Early industry commentary and launch coverage emphasised its role in structuring risk information for use by principal designers, principal contractors and owners.

== Key concepts ==
=== Common data environment ===
A CDE is the agreed source of information for a project or asset, supporting version control, status transitions (work-in-progress, shared, published, archive) and auditability across stakeholders.

=== Roles and responsibilities ===
The series uses consistent role terms, including the appointing party, lead appointed party and appointed party; Part 4 also describes exchange-specific roles (provider, receiver, reviewer).

=== Information requirements and plans ===
Typical artefacts include Organizational, Asset and Project Information Requirements (OIR, AIR, PIR), Exchange Information Requirements (EIR), BIM Execution Plan (BEP) and information delivery plans (MIDP, TIDPs).

== Adoption and guidance ==
ISO 19650 is referenced in public-sector and major private projects internationally, often implemented using national guidance. In the UK, the UK BIM Framework provides detailed guidance on tendering, appointments and developing information requirements in line with ISO 19650.
