= BIM Collaboration Format =

Structured file format

The BIM Collaboration Format (BCF) is a structured file format suited to issue tracking with a building information model. The BCF is designed primarily for defining views of a building model and associated information on collisions and errors connected with specific objects in the view. The BCF allows users of different BIM software, and/or different disciplines to collaborate on issues with the project. The use of the BCF to coordinate changes to a BIM is an important aspect of OpenBIM.

The format was developed by Tekla and Solibri and later adopted as a standard by buildingSMART. Most major BIM modelling software platforms support some integration with BCF, typically through plug-ins provided by the BCF server vendor.

Although the BCF was originally conceived as a file base there are now many implementations using the cloud-based collaborative workflow described in the BCF API, including Open Source implementation as part of the Open Source BIM collective.

Research work has been done in Denmark looking into using the BCF for a broader range of information management and exchange in the architecture, engineering and construction (AEC) sector.

== Supporting software ==
There are two main categories of support for the BCF: authoring software and coordination software. Authoring software can generate and share BCF issues. Coordination software is most powerful at coordinating issues and presenting a user interface for the management and tracking of issues. Coordination software is typically a web-based service which allows for real-time coordination across multiple authoring software platforms and geographies. Most BIM software has a mix of these functions.

The BCF is supported natively by authoring software such as Vectorworks, ArchiCAD, Tekla Structures, Quadri, DDS CAD, BIMcollab Zoom, BIMsight, Solibri, Navisworks, and Simplebim. Standalone BCF plugins include BCF Manager, and BCFier. Coordination software as cloud services offering BCF based issue tracking include BIMcollab, Newforma Konekt, Vrex, Catenda's Bimsync, Bricks app, ACCA software's usBIM.platform, OpenProject and CUBE.

== See also ==
- Industry Foundation Classes
- aecXML
- BuildingSMART
- Open-source 3D file formats
