= BuildingSMART =

buildingSMART, formerly the International Alliance for Interoperability (IAI), is an international organisation which aims to improve the exchange of information between software applications used in the construction industry. It has developed Industry Foundation Classes (IFCs) as a neutral and open specification for Building Information Models (BIM) as well as Information Delivery Specification (IDS).

== History ==
The IAI started in 1994 as an industry consortium of 12 US companies invited by Autodesk to advise on developing a set of C++ classes to support integrated application development. The other founding members were AT&T; Archibus; Carrier Corporation; Hellmuth, Obata & Kassabaum (HOK); Honeywell; Jaros, Baum & Bolles (JB&B); Lawrence Berkeley Laboratory; Primavera Systems; Softdesk; Timberline Software Corp; and Tishman Research Corp (part of Tishman Realty & Construction). The new technology was first demonstrated in June 1995 in Atlanta at A/E/C SYSTEMS '95.

This Industry Alliance for Interoperability opened membership to all interested parties in September 1995 and in May 1996 was renamed the International Alliance for Interoperability as Autodesk users insisted that the IFCs should be non-proprietary and urged development of the IFC standard. The first version of IFC was published in June 1996 at which point 26 companies, including Autodesk, Bentley, Nemetschek and IEZ, committed to making their software IFC-compliant. The IAI was reconstituted as a not-for-profit industry-led organisation, promoting the Industry Foundation Class (IFC) as a neutral product model supporting the building lifecycle.

In 2005, partly because its members felt the IAI name was too long and complex for people to understand, it was renamed buildingSMART. It has regional chapters in Europe, North America, Australia, Asia and the Middle East.

== Activities ==
BuildingSMART says it develops and maintains international standards for openBIM, combining:

- buildingSMART Processes - information delivery manuals
- buildingSMART Data Dictionary (bsDD)
- buildingSMART Data model - the organisation manages the software-neutral Industry Foundation Classes (IFC) data model

buildingSMART also maintains the BIM Collaboration Format (BCF), a structured file format used for issue tracking in relation to building information models.

== Chapters ==
BuildingSMART has multiple chapters around the world.

- Australasia
- Austria
- Benelux
- Brazil
- Canada
- China
- Croatia
- Czech Republic
- Denmark
- Ecuador
- Finland
- France
- Germany
- Greece
- Hong Kong, China
- Iceland
- Italy
- India
- Japan
- Kazakhstan
- Korea
- Morocco
- Norway
- North America
- Norway
- Poland
- Portugal
- Romania
- Saudi Arabia
- Serbia
- Singapore
- Slovenia
- Spain
- Sweden
- Switzerland
- Turkey
- UAE
- USA
- UK & Ireland (in January 2018, the UK chapter merged with the UK BIM Alliance) (Note: In October 2022, the UK BIM Alliance rebranded as 'nima'.)
