= National Institute of Building Sciences =

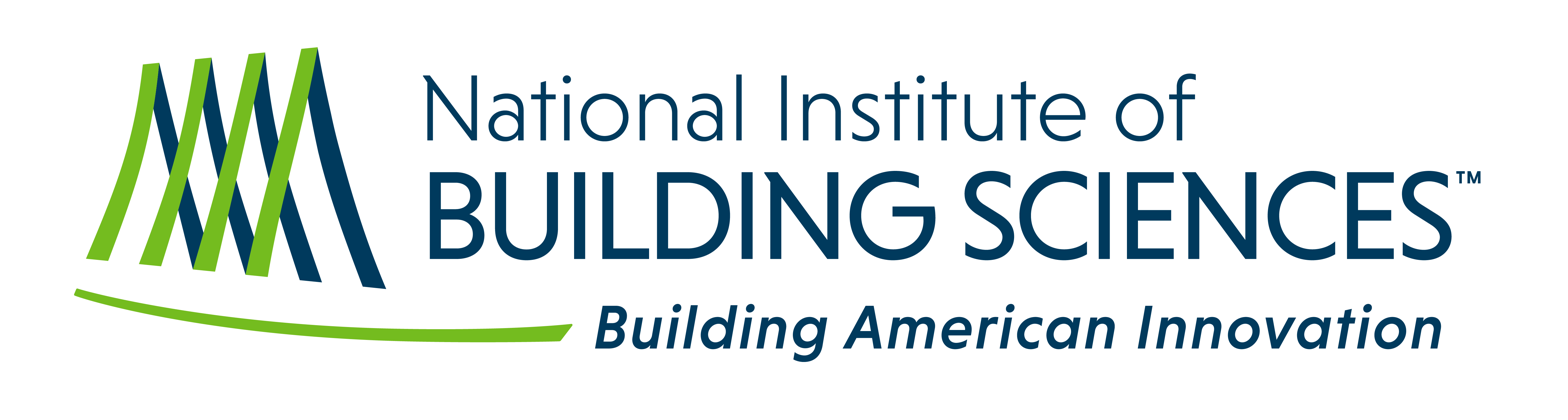
National Institute of Building Sciences logo

The National Institute of Building Sciences (NIBS), whose creation was authorized by the U.S. Congress in the Housing and Community Development Act of 1974., was tasked to serve as the U.S.' authoritative source of findings and recommendations in the nation's built environment. It is an independent, non-partisan 501(c)(3).

As of May 18, 2026, George K. Guszcza is the president and CEO of the NIBS.

== Congressional Support for The NIBS and Public Law Sole-Source Authority ==
The NIBS as an independent non-profit does not receive direct funding from Congress. However, as part of the law, Public Law No. 93-38, 12 USC §1701j–2, that created the NIBS, Congress granted the organization broad sole source authority:

Section (g)(3) ‘Every department, agency, and establishment of the Federal Government having responsibility for building or construction, or for building- or construction-related programs, is authorized and encouraged to request authorization and appropriations for grants to the Institute for its general support, and is authorized to contract with and accept contracts from the Institute for specific services where deemed appropriate by the responsible Federal official involved.’ This permits sole source awards to the NIBS for built environment related work under FAR Part 6.302-5 to include architectural, engineering, program and project management, and all other consulting and technology services and products appropriate for all building or construction, or for building or construction-related programs.

This sole source authority is in addition to and not constrained by the functions given by Congress to the NIBS: (e) Exercise of functions and responsibilities, which mainly focuses on the development and promulgation, prequalification and testing, conducting studies and investigations, and assembly, storage, and dissemination of design criteria, standards, and other technical provisions related to buildings and infrastructure. These functions and responsibilities enumerated by Congress can justify exception to competition found at FAR Part 6.302-1 due to unique technical expertise and capabilities.

== Board of Directors ==
The Institute is governed by a board of directors consisting of 21 members. All members serve three year terms with a third of the board up for re-election each year. The President of the United States, with the advice and consent of the Senate, appoints six members to represent the public interest. The remaining 15 members are elected from the nation's construction industry, including representatives of construction labor organizations, product manufacturers, and builders, housing management experts, and experts in building standards, codes, and fire safety, as well as public interest representatives including architects, professional engineers, officials of Federal, State, and local agencies, and representatives of consumer organizations. The board shall always have a majority of public interest representatives.

The board annually elects from among its members a chairman. It shall also elect one or more vice chairmen. The terms are for one year and no one can serve as chairman or vice chairman for more than two consecutive terms.

Among the board's duties is to appoint a president and CEO, and other executive officers and as they see fit.

=== Board members appointed by the President ===
The current members of the board that are appointed by the President, as of May 18, 2026:

Position	Name	Occupation	Took office	Term expires
Secretary	Evelyn M. Fujimoto	Principal, Director of Design, Interiors at STG Design	October 1, 2021	September 7, 2022
Member	Lori Peek	Director, Natural Hazards Center and Sociology Professor, University of Colorado Boulder	October 1, 2021	September 7, 2022
Member	Kimberly L. Jones	Associate Dean, Research and Graduate Education, College of Engineering and Architecture and Professor and Chair, Department of Civil and Environmental Engineering, Howard University	October 1, 2021	September 7, 2023
Member	William E. Holloway	Vice President and Principal, Bernardon	October 1, 2021	September 7, 2024
Member	Vacant			
Member	Vacant			

== Councils and Workgroups ==
- Building Enclosure Technology and Environment Council (BETEC) shall develop a sound technical and economic basis for the design, construction, and operation of new buildings and the modification of existing buildings to optimize energy efficiency, while maintaining function, durability, and a healthy and comfortable indoor environment. Through a cooperative agreement with the American Institute of Architects, BETEC has formed and organized Building Enclosure Councils in 37 locations across the country.
- Building Seismic Safety Council (BSSC) shall work to enhance public safety by improving earthquake-resistant design and construction throughout the United States. BSSC represents a variety of interests related to seismic safety. The Council develops seismic safety provisions for the National Earthquake Hazards Reduction Program, and promotes their adoption in voluntary standards and model codes.
- Consultative Council shall advise and support the NIBS by making recommendations for presentation by the NIBS to the President of the United States on developing and applying science and technology to improve the built environment in the public interest through standards, codes, regulations, and industry practices affecting the design, construction and operation of buildings.
- Digital Technology Council (formerly the buildingSMART alliance) shall advance digital transformation for the built environment through the delivery of consensus-based industry standards, research, and thought-leadership focusing on value-driven outcomes.
- Facility Management and Operations Council (FMOC) shall provide industry-wide, public and private support for the creation of higher quality facilities through improved maintenance and operation and real property management.
- Multi-Hazard Mitigation Council (MMC) shall disseminate credible information and counsel on major policy issues involving multi-hazard disaster resilience and risk reduction. Under MMC, the subcommittee for finance, insurance and real-estate, banks, insurance companies and real estate firms (CFIRE) shall promote collaboration better address the challenges of evaluating risks, benefits, technologies and practices associated with the achievement of cost-effective high-performance buildings.

== Standards and Technology Programs ==
- National CAD Standard
- Whole Building Design Guide
- National BIM Standard - NBIMS-US™
- ProjNet
- High Performance Building Guide (formerly GSA's Sustainable Facilities Tool)
