= Bonavista Downs =

Neighbourhood in Calgary

- Neighbourhood
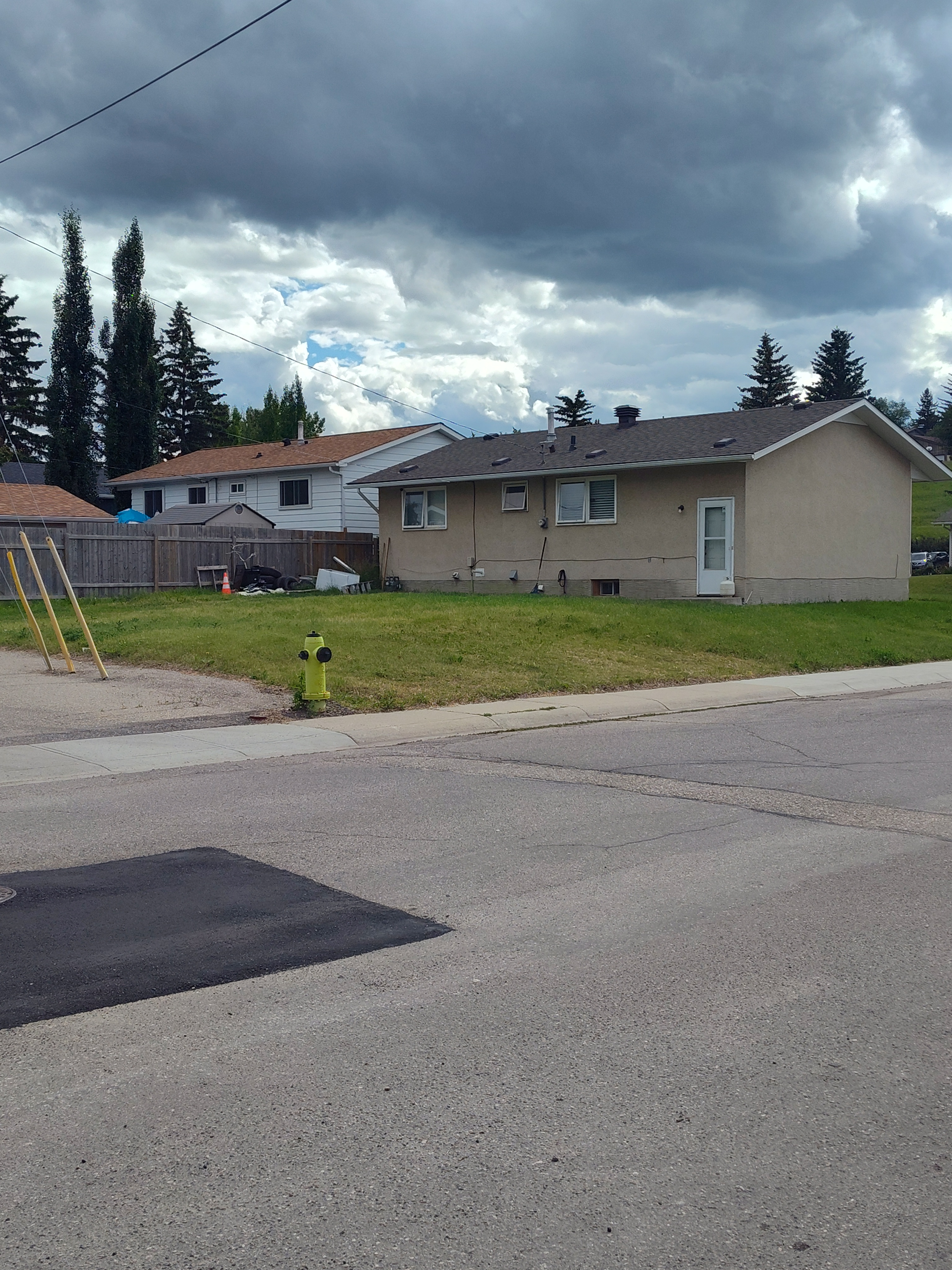
- 1970s bungalow house located inside of Bonavista Downs
- Interactive map of Bonavista Downs
- Country: Canada
- Province: Alberta
- City: Calgary
- Quadrant: SE
- Ward: 14
- Established: 1973

Area
  - Total: 0.592 km^{2} (0.229 sq mi)

Population (2021)
  - Total: 830
- Postal Code: T2J 3E5

Bonavista Downs is a residential community in the southeast quadrant of Calgary, Alberta, Canada. Bonavista Downs is represented under Ward 14.

Bonavista Downs is not to be confused with Lake Bonavista, which sits directly to the west of the community. These two communities are listed as distinct identities from one-another by the City of Calgary.

The community is located in a geographical depression, being located downhill from Lake Bonavista and Queensland. Street names in the neighbourhood are named after existing lakes across the world in the same manner as Lake Bonavista's streets; with the majority of streets in Bonavista Downs being named after the Great Lakes, such as with Lake Huron Crescent SE, Lake Ontario Drive SE, and Lake Michigan Road SE.

Bonavista Downs features its own community hall and community association, and is a part of the Federation of Calgary Communities.

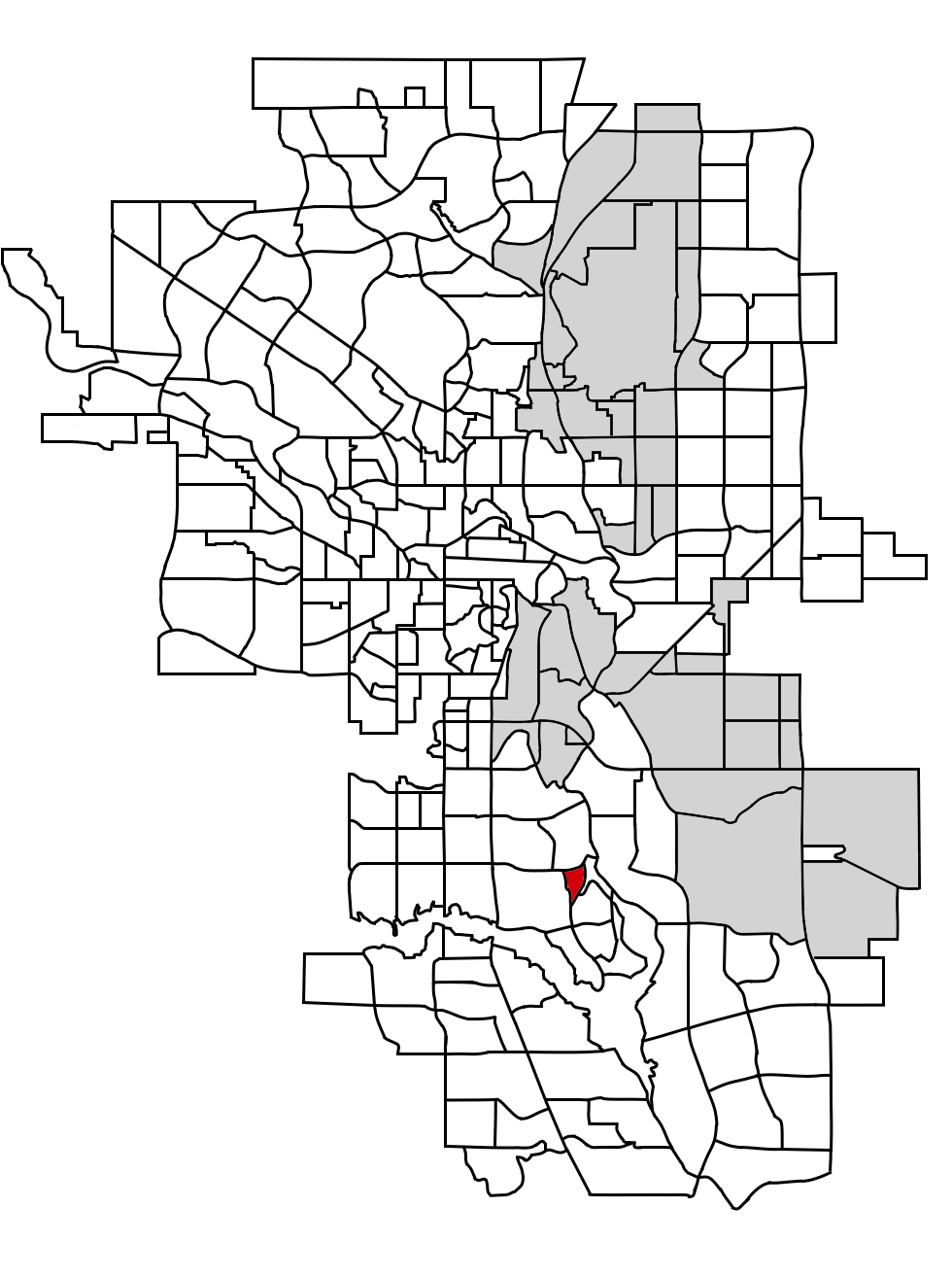
Location of Bonavista Downs in Calgary

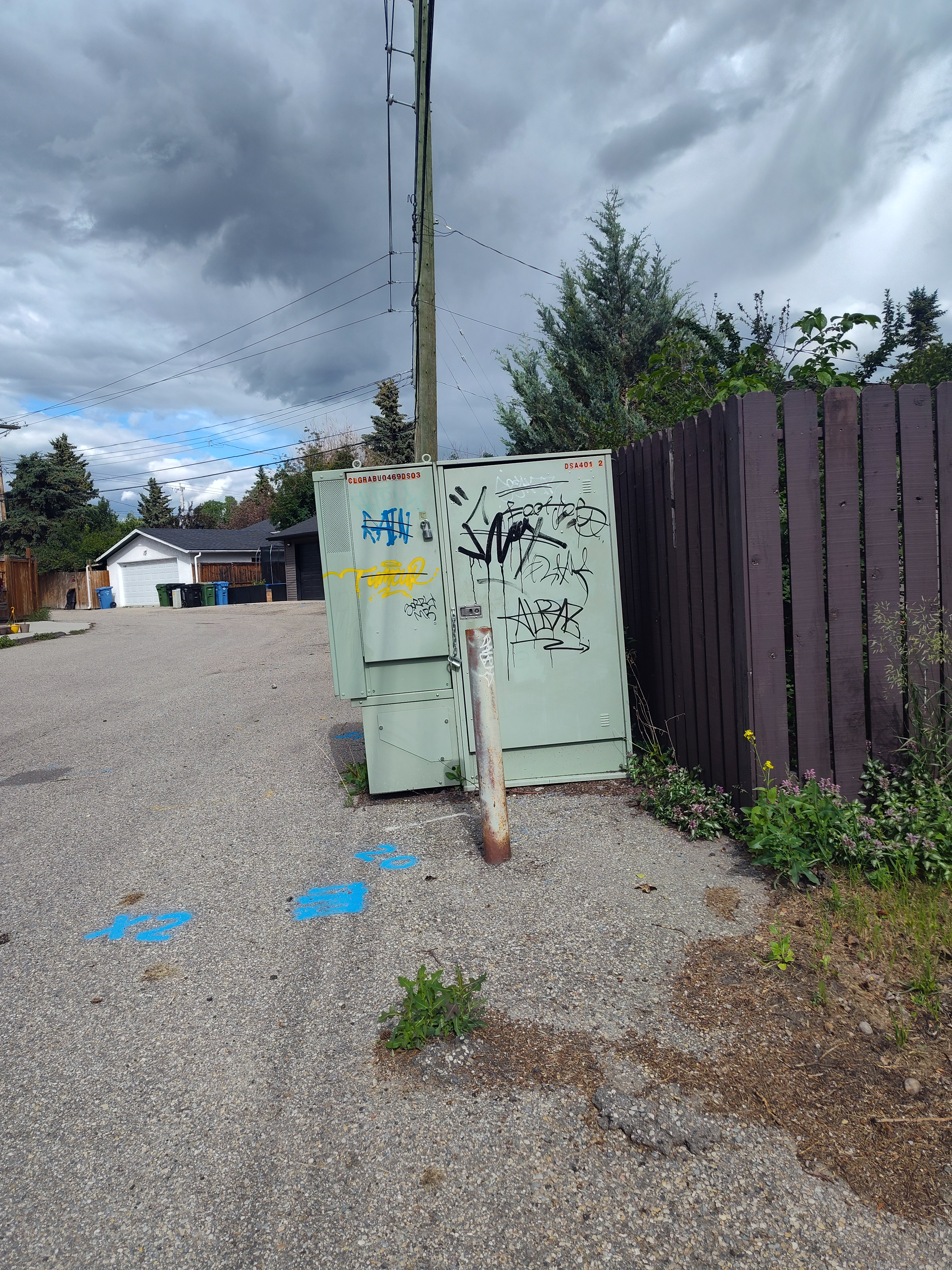
Electrical box covered in graffiti located inside of Bonavista Downs

== Community boundaries ==
The community of Bonavista Downs is located in the southeast quadrant of Calgary. It is bounded by Anderson Road to the north, a natural existing hill to the west and south, and Bow Bottom Trail to the east. Maple Ridge sits directly to the north of the community, Lake Bonavista sits directly to the west, and Diamond Cove and Queensland sit directly to the east.

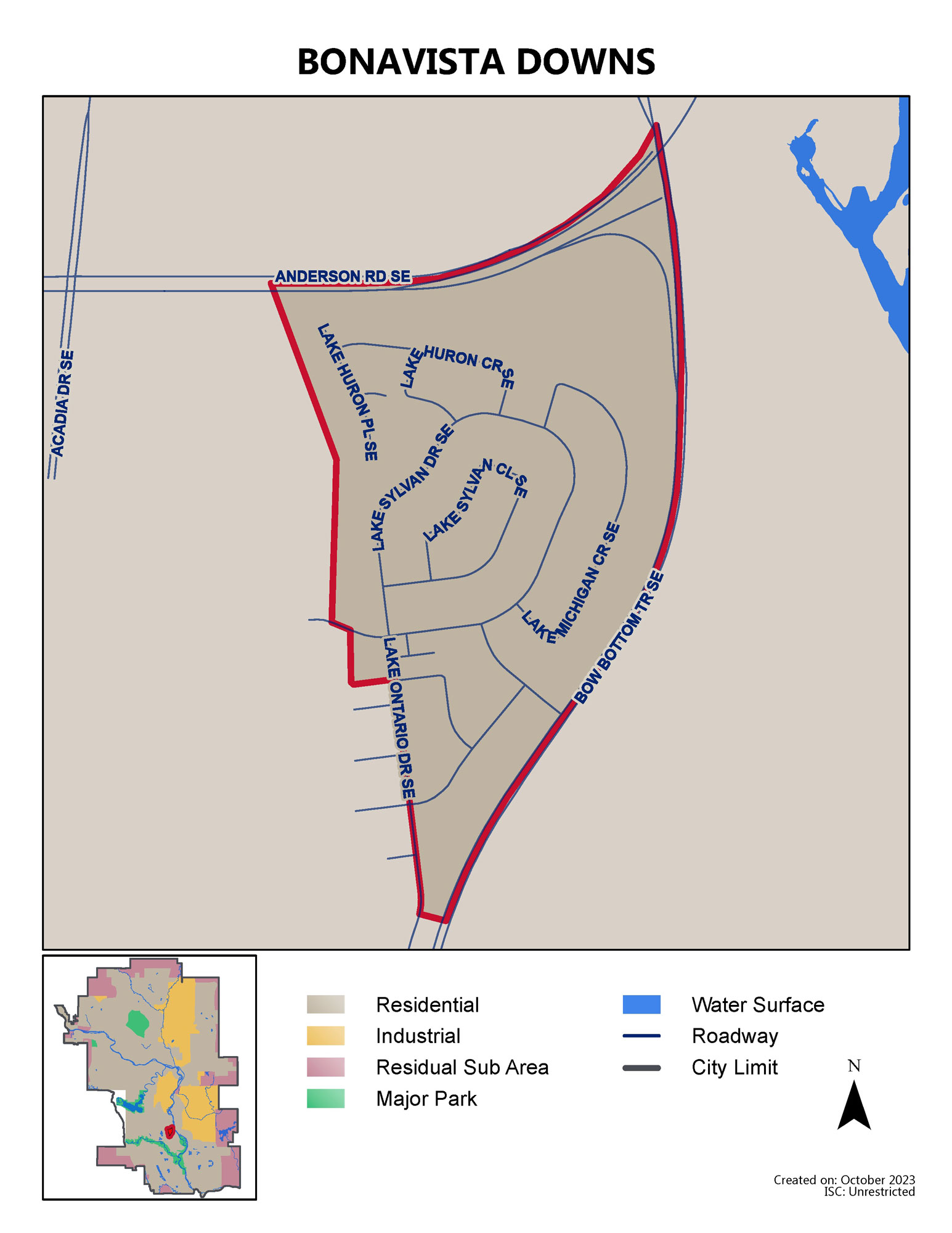
Map of the community boundaries of Bonavista Downs, according to the City of Calgary

== History ==
Bonavista Downs was established as a community in 1973. It was originally titled under the name of "Lake Bonavista Downs", with it being changed at an unknown date.

By the year 1982, the entire neighborhood had been developed.

== Transit ==
Calgary Transit bus route 29 runs through the neighborhood, providing transit connections to Anderson CTrain Station and Deer Ridge/Queensland respectively.

A bus trap is located inside the community, located at the intersection of Bow Bottom Trail and Lake Michigan Drive.

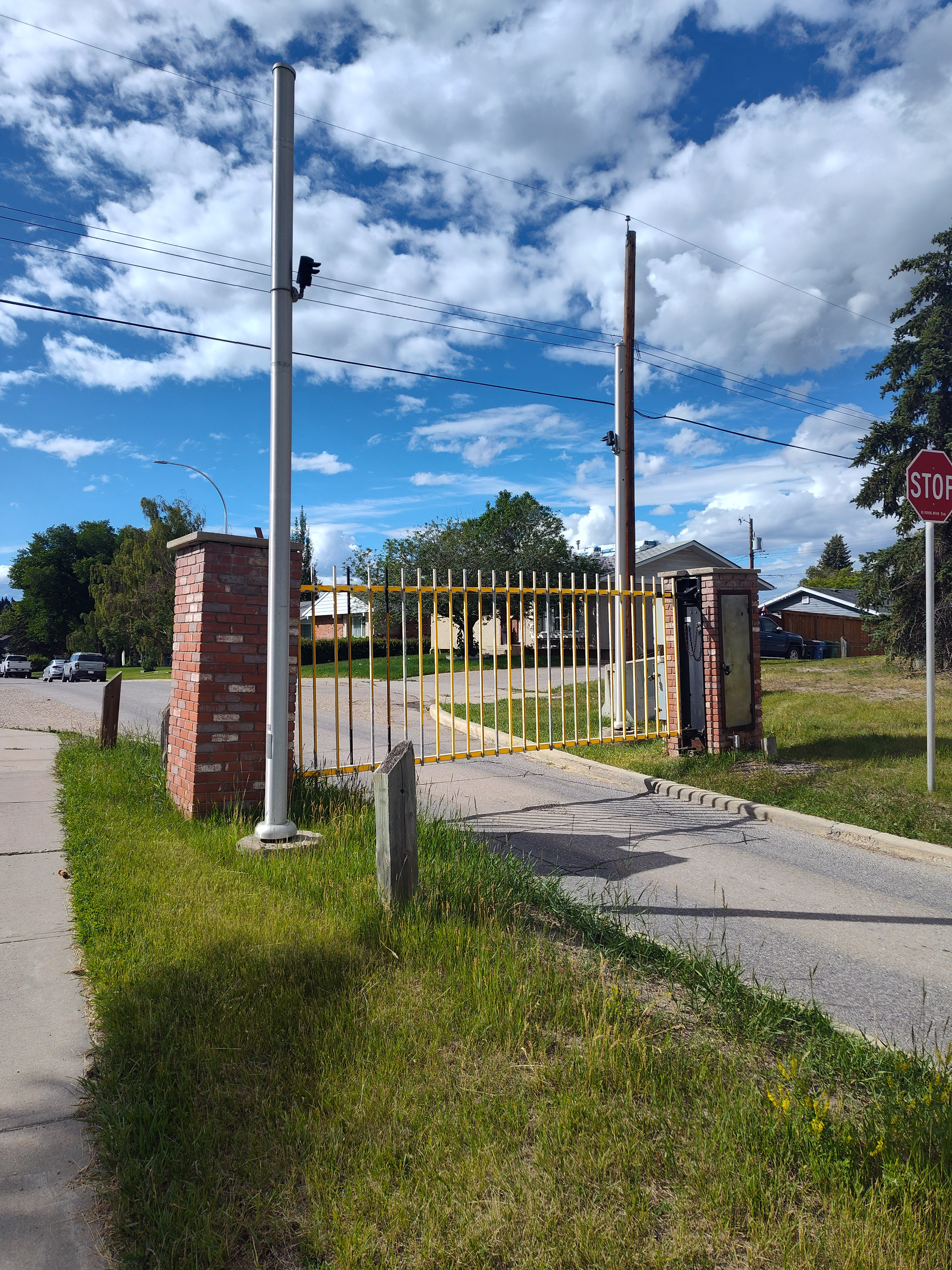
Bus trap allowing only Calgary Transit buses to pass through it, located inside of the Bonavista Downs community

Walk Score gave Bonavista Downs a walk score rating of 22 and a transit score rating of 33.

== Population and demographics ==
=== Population ===
According to the 2021 Calgary municipal census, the community of Bonavista Downs had a population of 830, a decrease from its 2019 population of 928.

Pop. Overtime
Year	Population	Year	Population
1973	437	2014	956
1978	1301	2015	971
1983	1408	2016	923
1988	1454	2017	911
1993	1342	2018	919
1999	1107	2019	928
2004	1021	2021	830

Bonavista Downs had a peak population of 1474 in the year 1982, representing a population change of -43.69%.

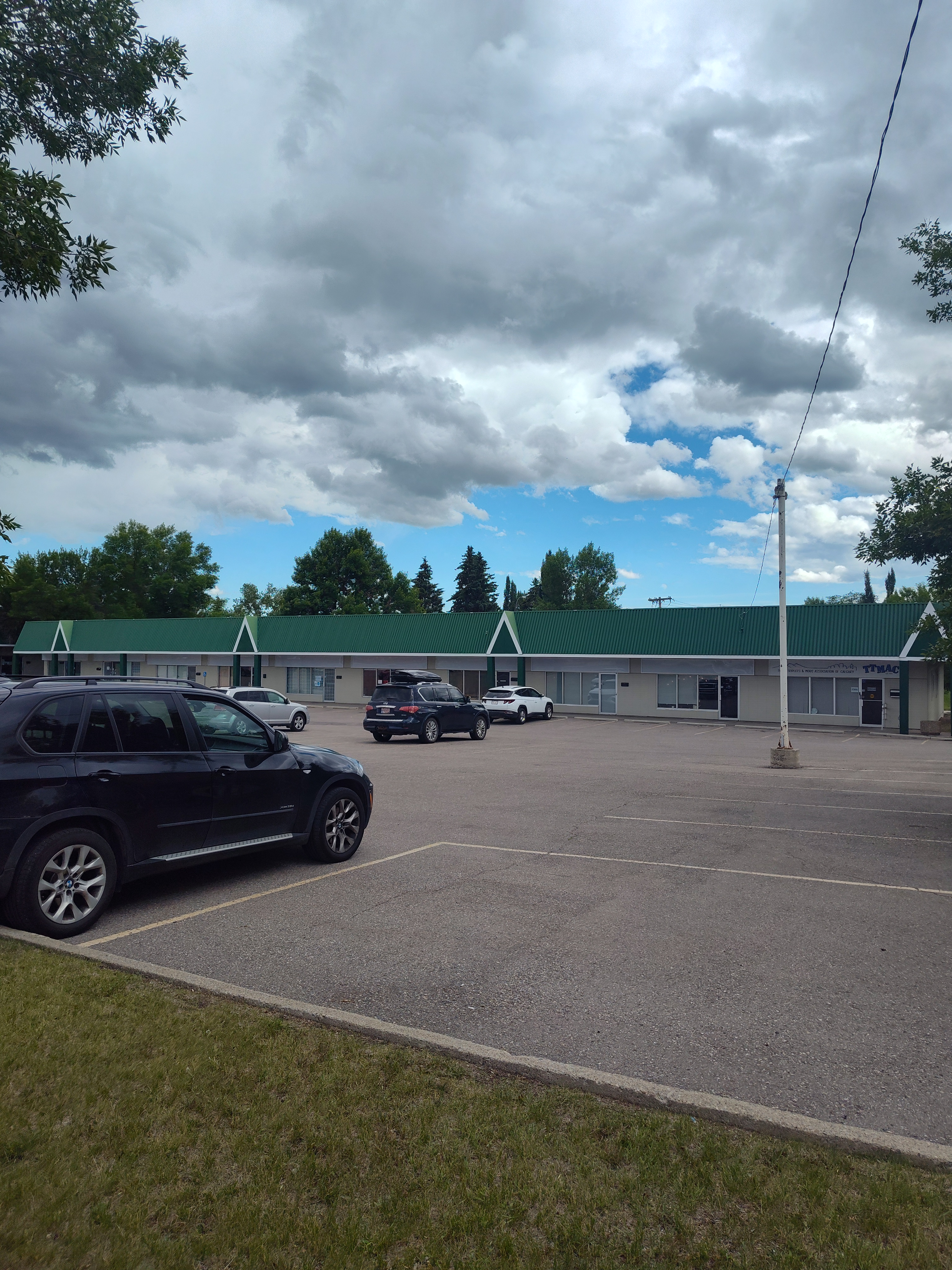
Bonavista Village shopping plaza with mostly vacant store-fronts located inside of Bonavista Downs

=== Income ===
According to the 2021 Calgary municipal census, Bonavista Downs had a median household income of $93,000, compared to the citywide median of $98,000. Twenty percent of households spent 30% or more of their income on sheltered, compared to the city-wide average of 23%. 10% of households in Bonavista Downs were classified as low-income, in comparison to the city-wide average of 9%.

=== Demographics ===
According to the 2021 Calgary municipal census, 8% of Bonavista Downs' population were immigrants, compared to the Calgary city-wide average of 32%. The majority of Forest Heights' immigrant population are of European descent at 64%.

== Crime ==
Crime Data
Year	Crime Rate (/100)
2018	0.8
2019	3.1
2020	0.7
2021	1.1
2022	0.4
2023	1.1
2024	1.3

== See also ==
- List of neighbourhoods in Calgary
