= Bus trap =

Feature for restricting access on roads

A bus trap (car trap in the UK) is a metal grate placed over a ditch or pit in the road with tines (sides) spaced far enough apart that small, shorter-axled vehicles fall between the sides, but longer-axled vehicles, such as buses, may pass. Bicycles may also cross on the wider sections.

Different versions exist for restricting access. The tines cross the path of the road, not parallel with the road direction. Small-wheeled vehicles bottom out in between the tines, preventing the vehicle from continuing over the obstacle.

== Disadvantages ==
Many domestic vehicles exist in the 21st century wide enough to navigate bus traps effectively, including wide-axle SUVs and 4x4s. Police cars and in some cases motorbikes are hindered by bus traps. When a vehicle hits a bus trap, the bus trap may also become damaged, requiring possibly extensive repairs. The driver may suffer 'potentially physical and psychological trauma' as a result of hitting a bus trap.

Bus traps may also be counterproductive, as when a vehicle gets stuck, the bus services becomes disrupted until the vehicle can be towed out.

Most cities favour other means of keeping cars out of bus-only areas, such as:

- fines backed up with camera enforcement
- a controlled barrier, such as a rising clearly marked bollard kept in a default risen state — may use radio-frequency identification

== Examples ==
The city of Calgary, Canada, began installation of bus traps in 1970s and primarily used them to restrict access to transit facilities and neighborhoods attempting to discourage pass-through traffic. The last seven bus traps are scheduled to be removed in 2023 and 2024.

The Cambridgeshire Guided Busway has numerous car traps, where they interact with road traffic. As of November 2023, at least 60 incidents of cars being trapped in them have occurred on one trap in St Ives. As a result, the council installed additional signs at that location with the hope to reduce the number of drivers ignoring and being trapped in them.

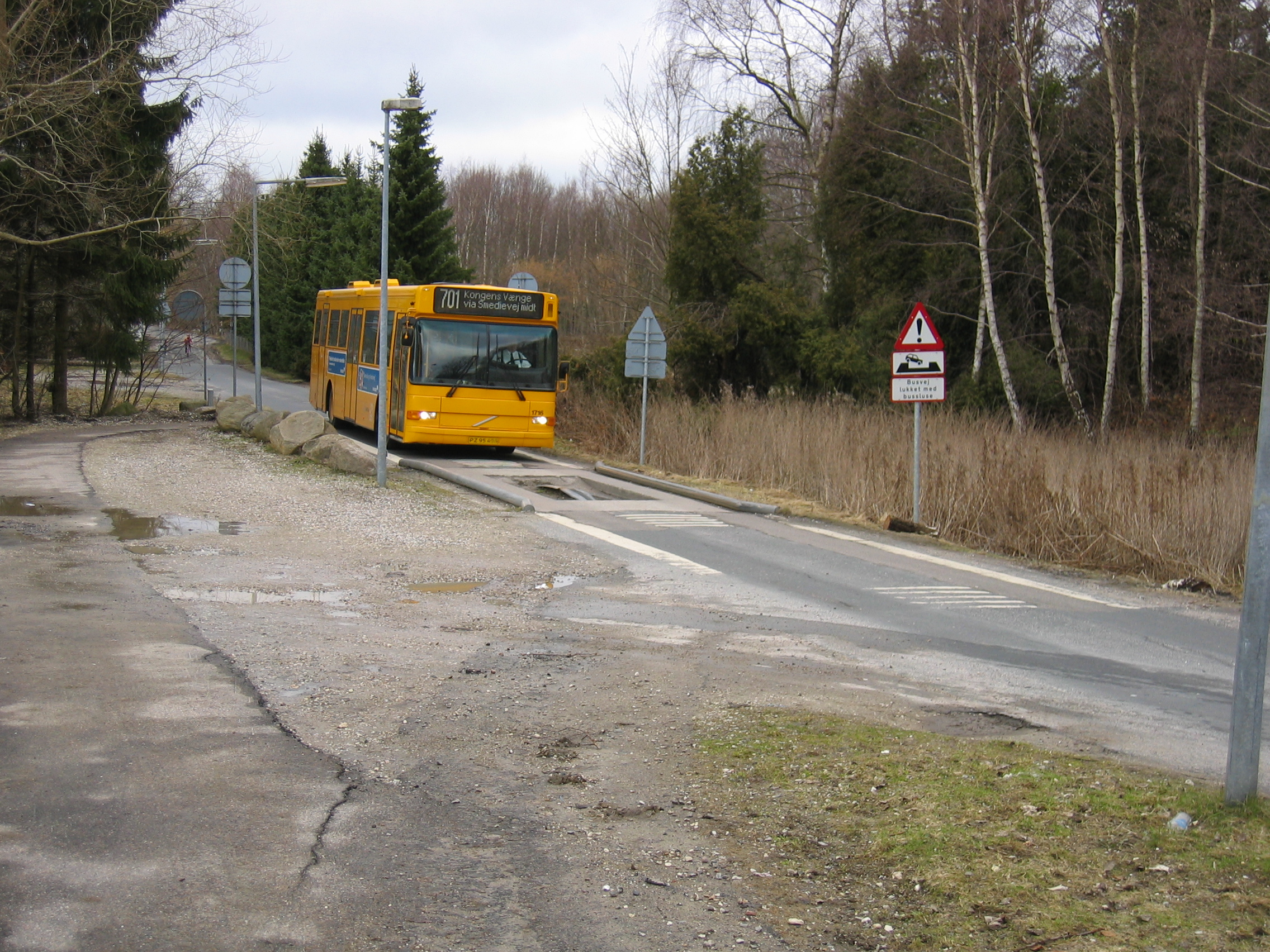
A bus trap in Denmark

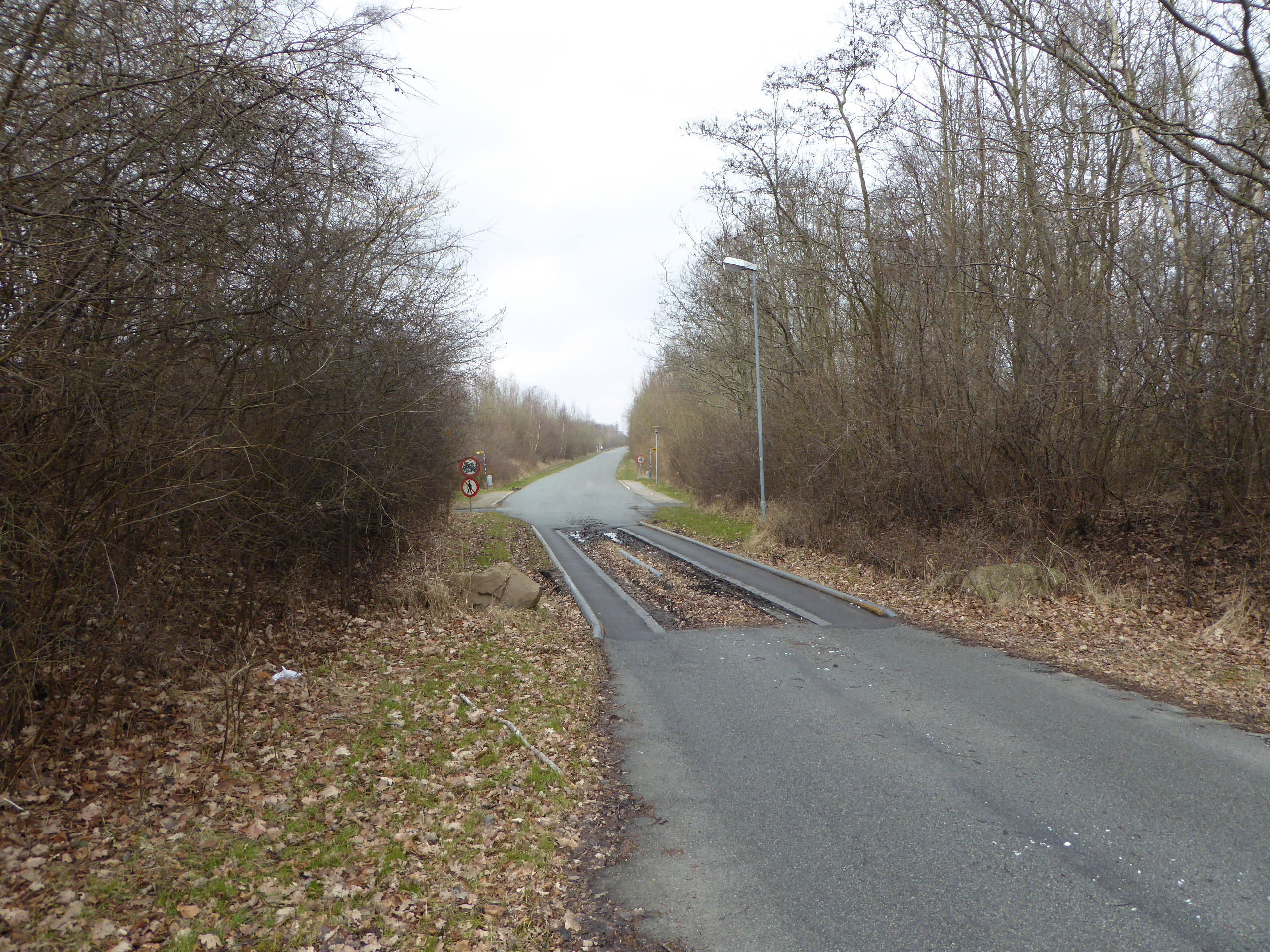
In northern Aarhus, Denmark

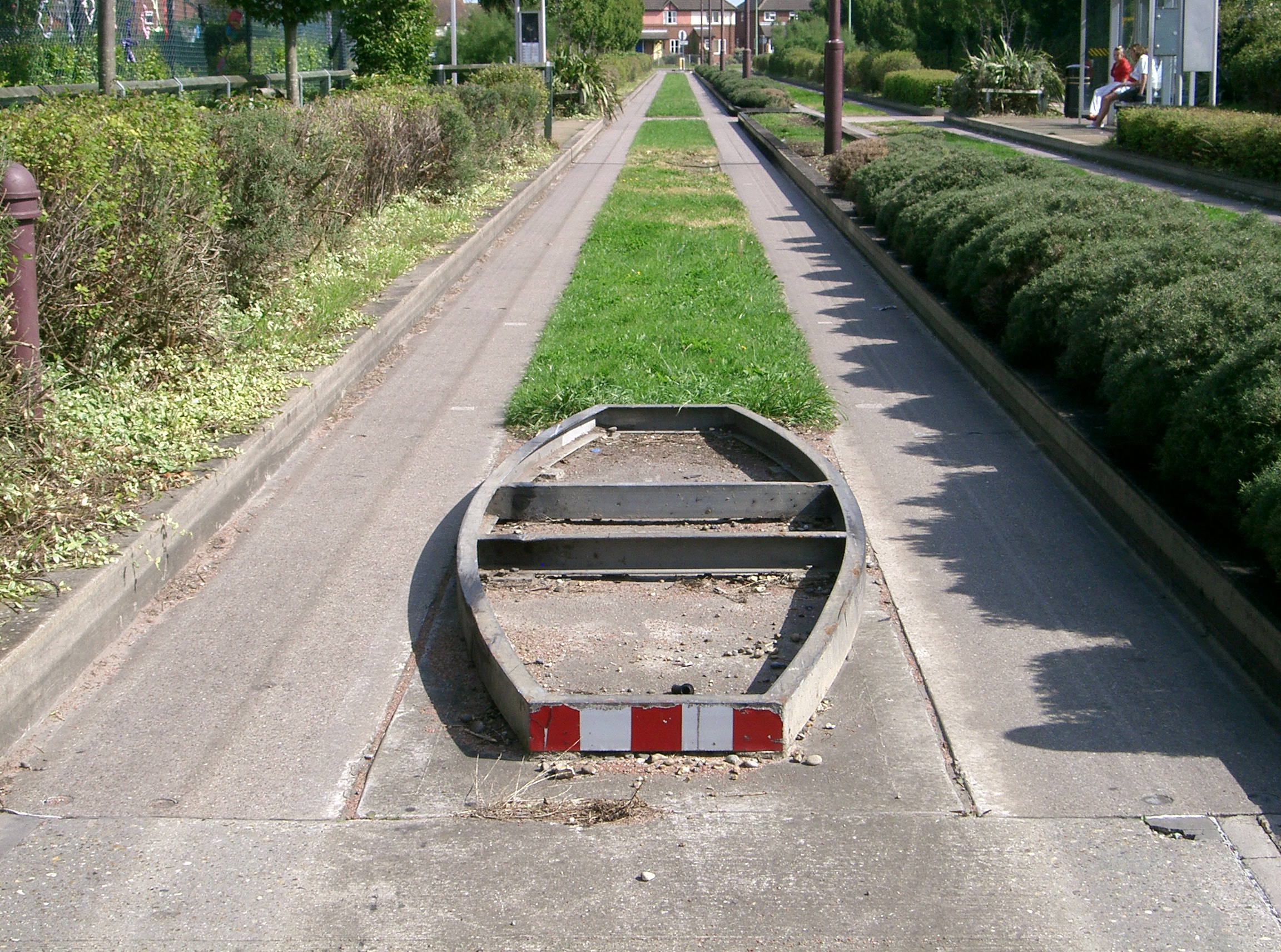
Barrier on the entrance to a busway in Ipswich, England

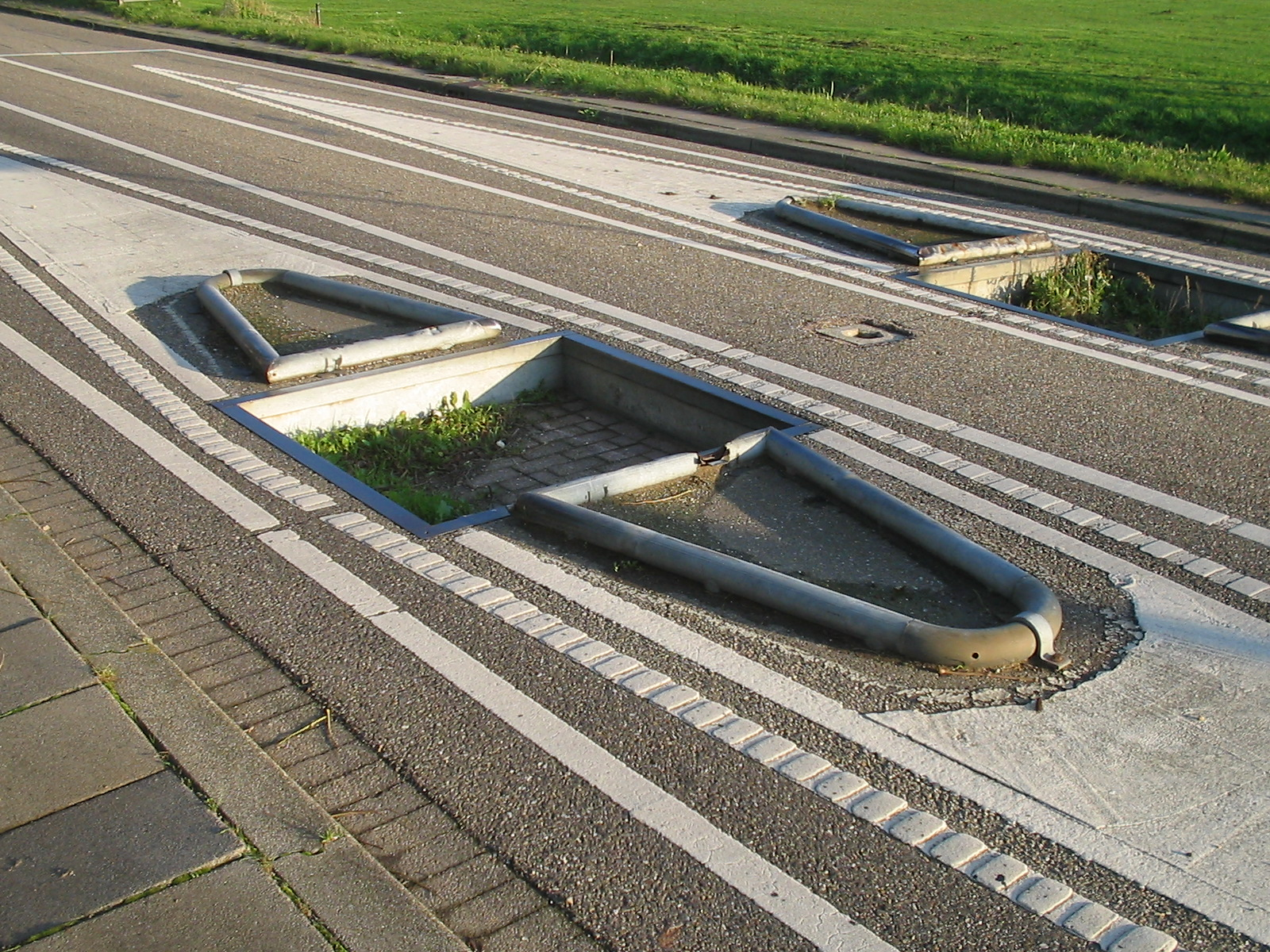
In Delft, The Netherlands

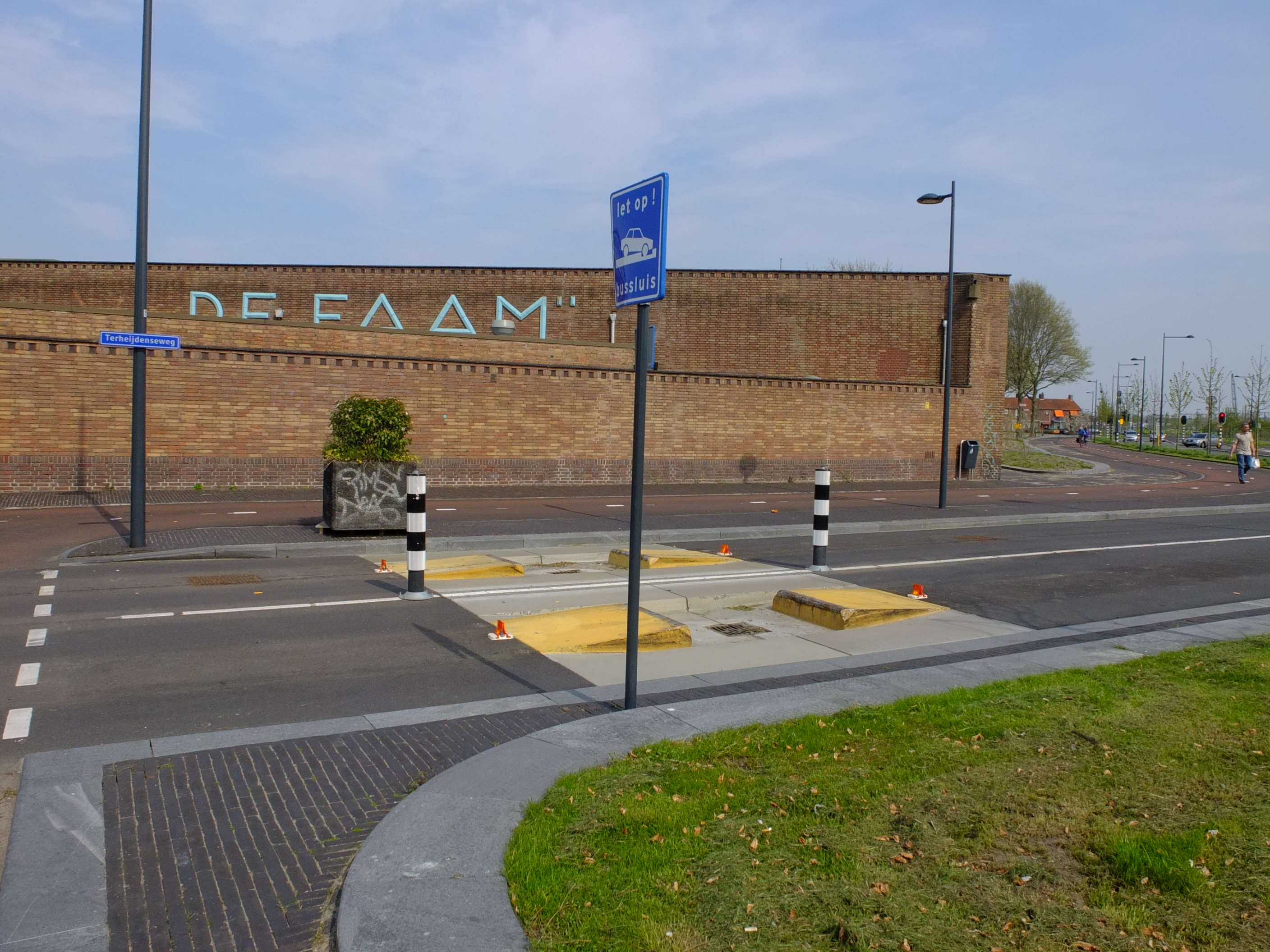
In Breda, The Netherlands

== See also ==
- Sump buster
- Cattle grid
