= Sump buster =

Feature for restricting access on roads

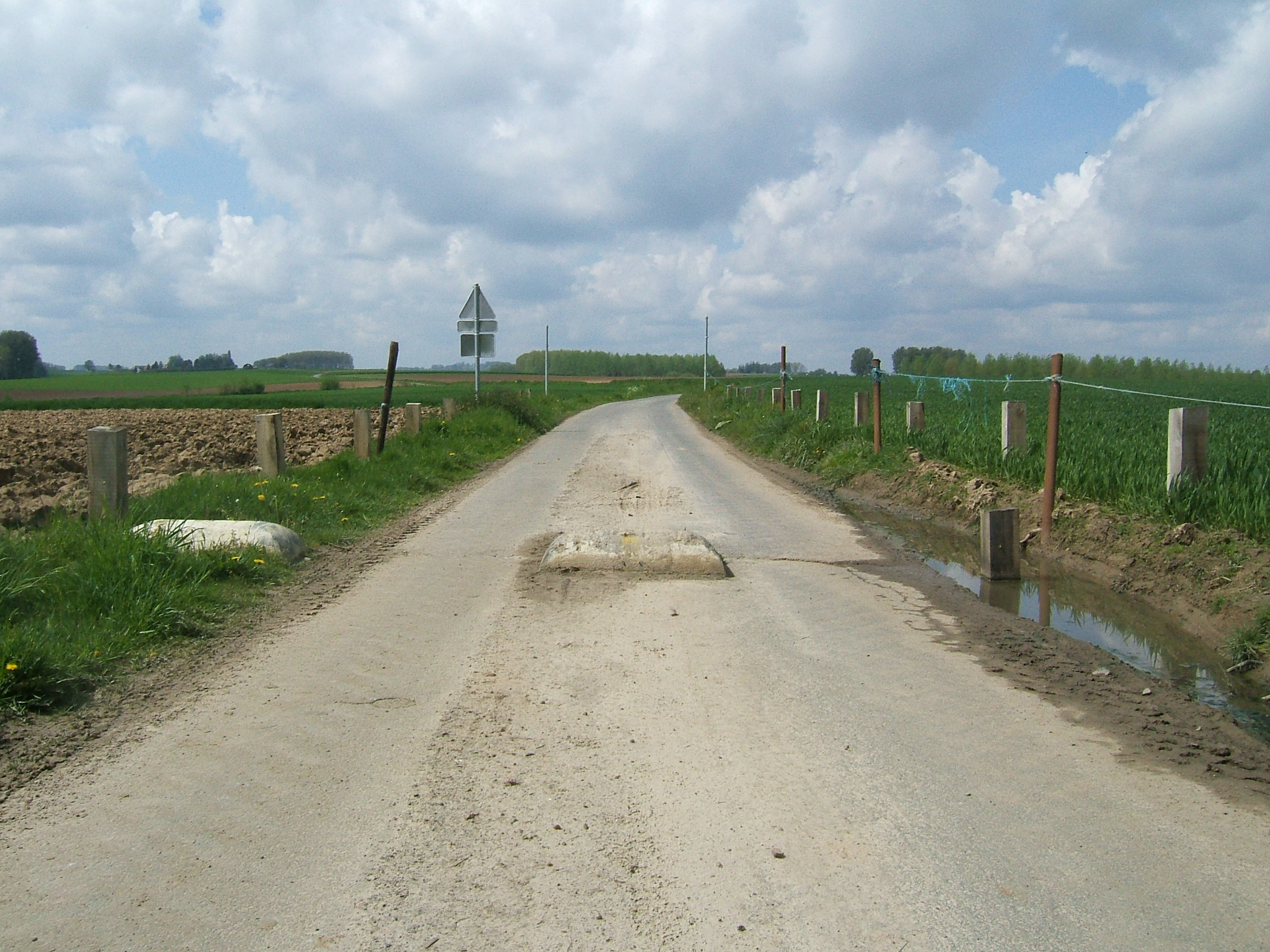
Sump-buster on rural road in Lennik, Belgium

A sump buster is a device installed within a bus route to limit that thoroughfare to buses. It discourages traffic from entering a lane by promising to destroy the oil pan of any vehicle with insufficient ground clearance to get over it, making them similar in use (but not design) to rising bollards. A sump buster can also be known as a "sump breaker" or "sump trap". Sump busters were first used in the 1980s.

== Function ==
The sump buster uses a non-mechanical solid mass of concrete, or sometimes other aggregates or metal, to demobilise a vehicle when access to a restricted area is attempted. When a vehicle attempts to traverse the sump buster, the device will demolish the vehicle's oil pan (literally "busting the sump"). The track and ground clearance on permitted vehicles, usually buses, is such that they may clear the device with ease. In some cases, advisory or mandatory speed limits are given.

== Impact on the community ==
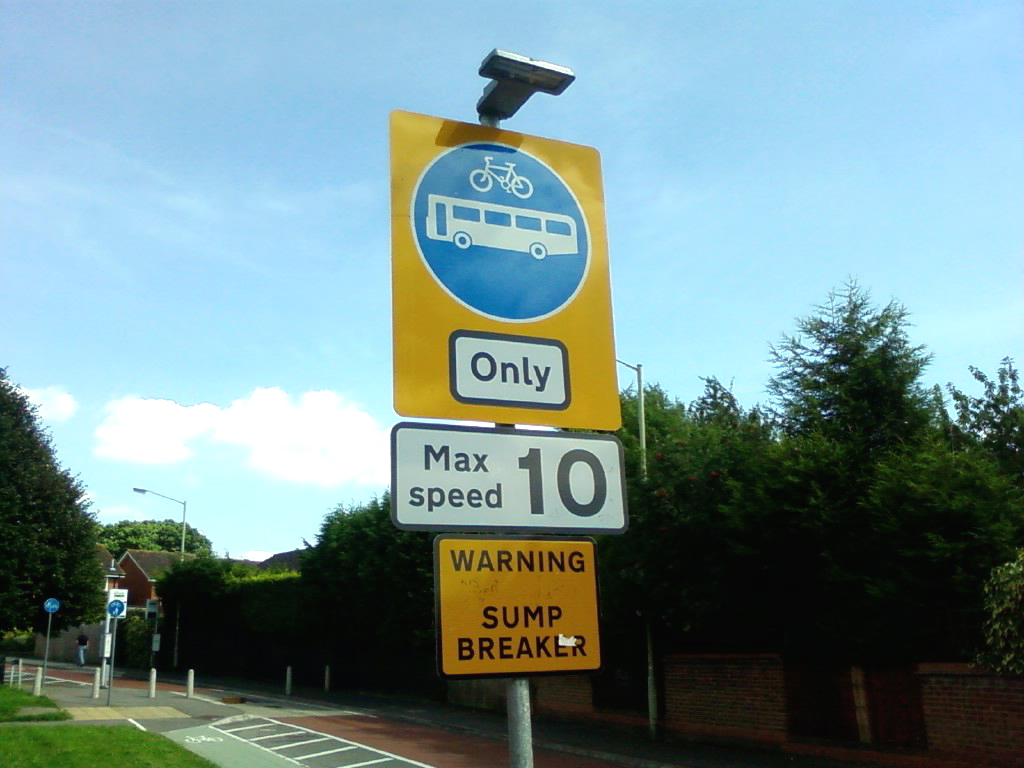
A warning sign and sump buster (lower left background) in Calcot, Berkshire, United Kingdom

A major purpose of the sump buster is to prevent road systems being used as rat runs and, to a certain extent, joyriding. For this reason, devices have been vandalised (either through annoyance at their existence or to attempt to gain passage), resulting in accidents (and injuries) to legitimate road users.

In January 2005, Devon County Council dismissed an application by the Stagecoach Group for the installation of a sump buster on Tan Lane (a restricted access road) in Exeter. The Exeter Highways and Traffic Orders Committee stated that "[using a sump buster] is not an option that the County Council could support [as] it would not differentiate between high clearance vehicles and for example cars and vans that are authorised to use the link under the current Traffic Regulation Order".

Sump busters have led to serious injuries to scooter drivers and cyclists who fail to notice them. Municipalities in the Netherlands have been sued after damage or injuries caused by insufficiently marked sump busters.

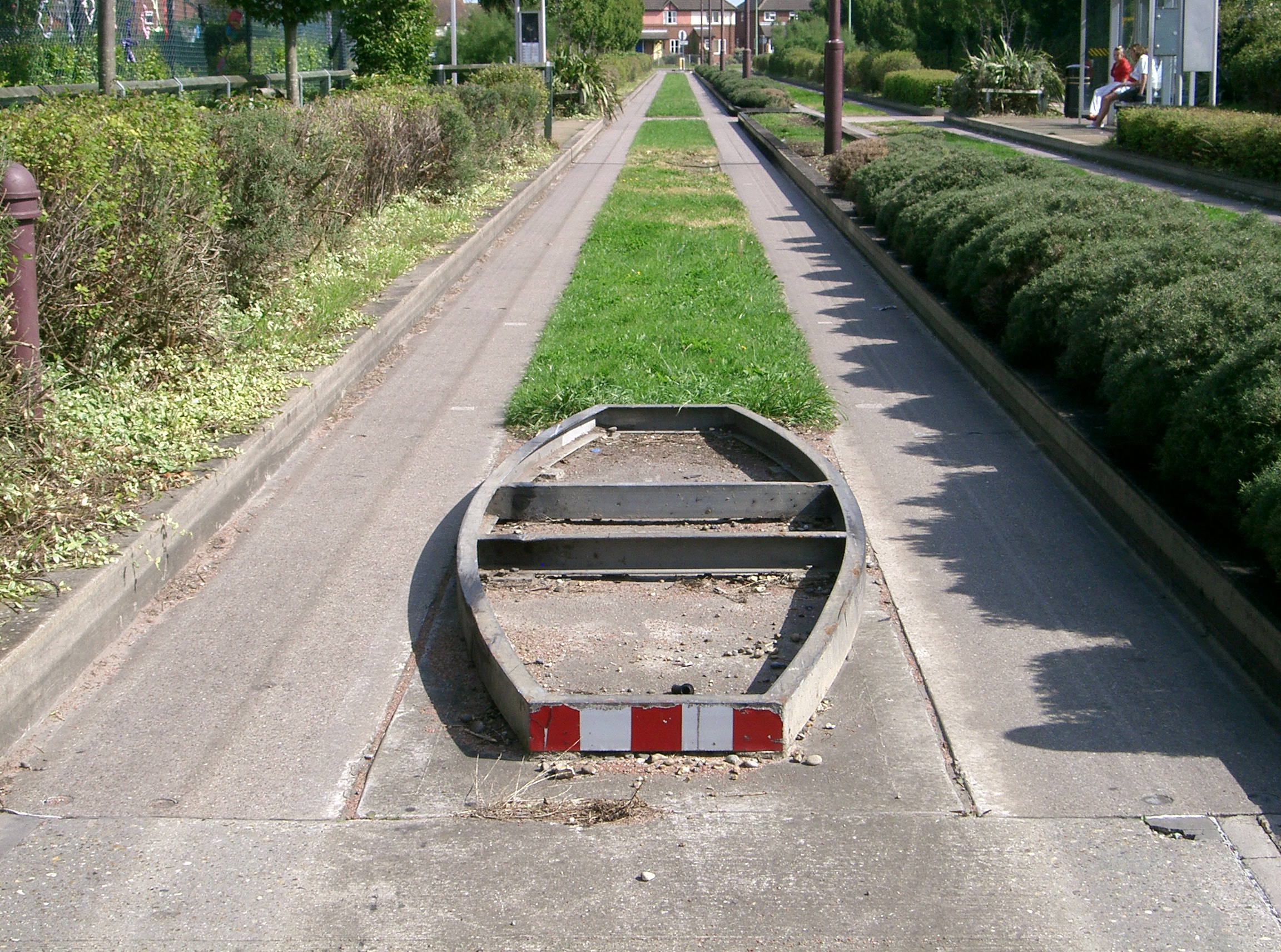
The galvanised steel sump buster/traps of the Kesgrave Guided Busway, Ipswich

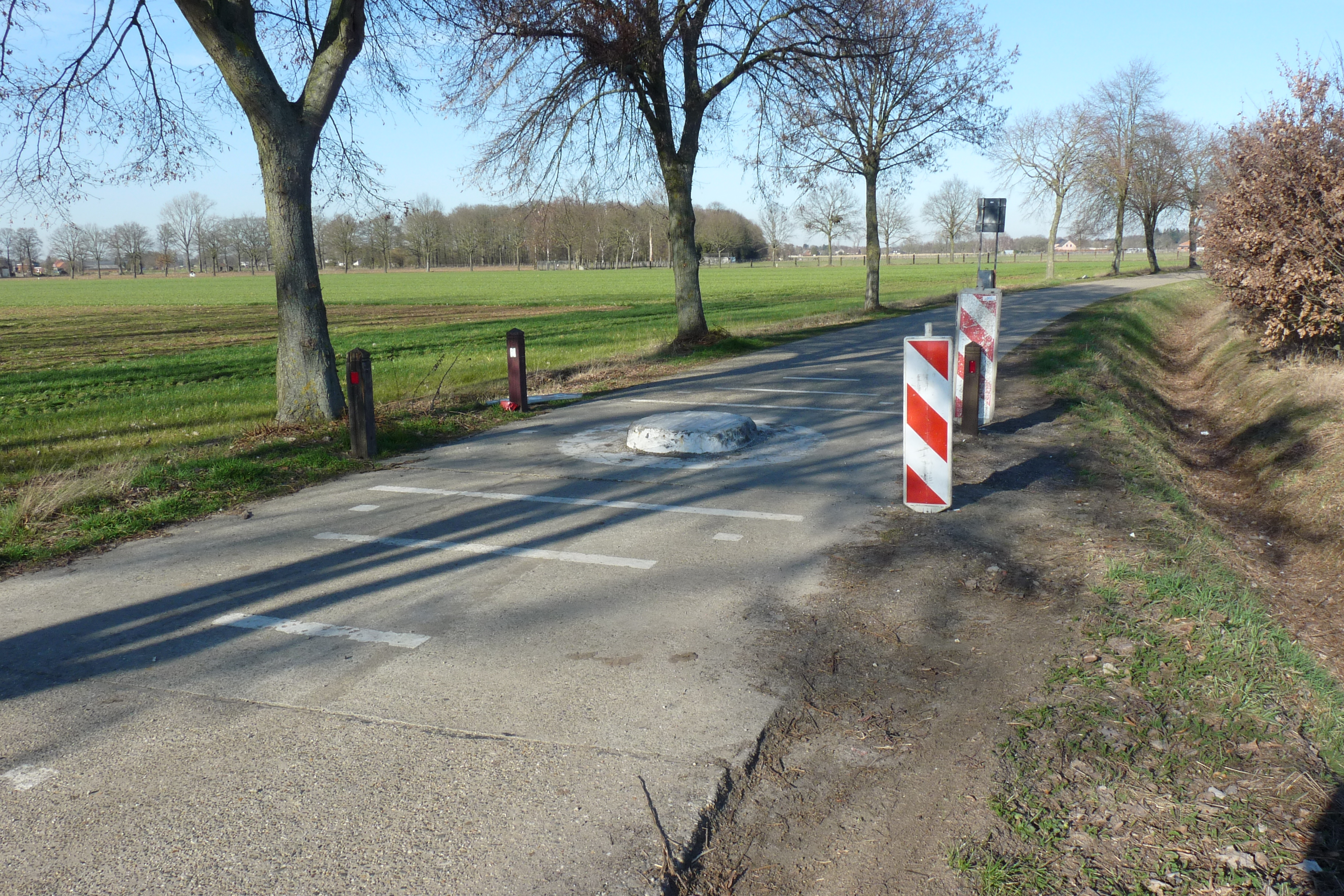
Sump-buster on rural road in Morkhoven, Belgium

== See also ==
- Bus trap
