= Traffic bollard =

Short post for traffic control

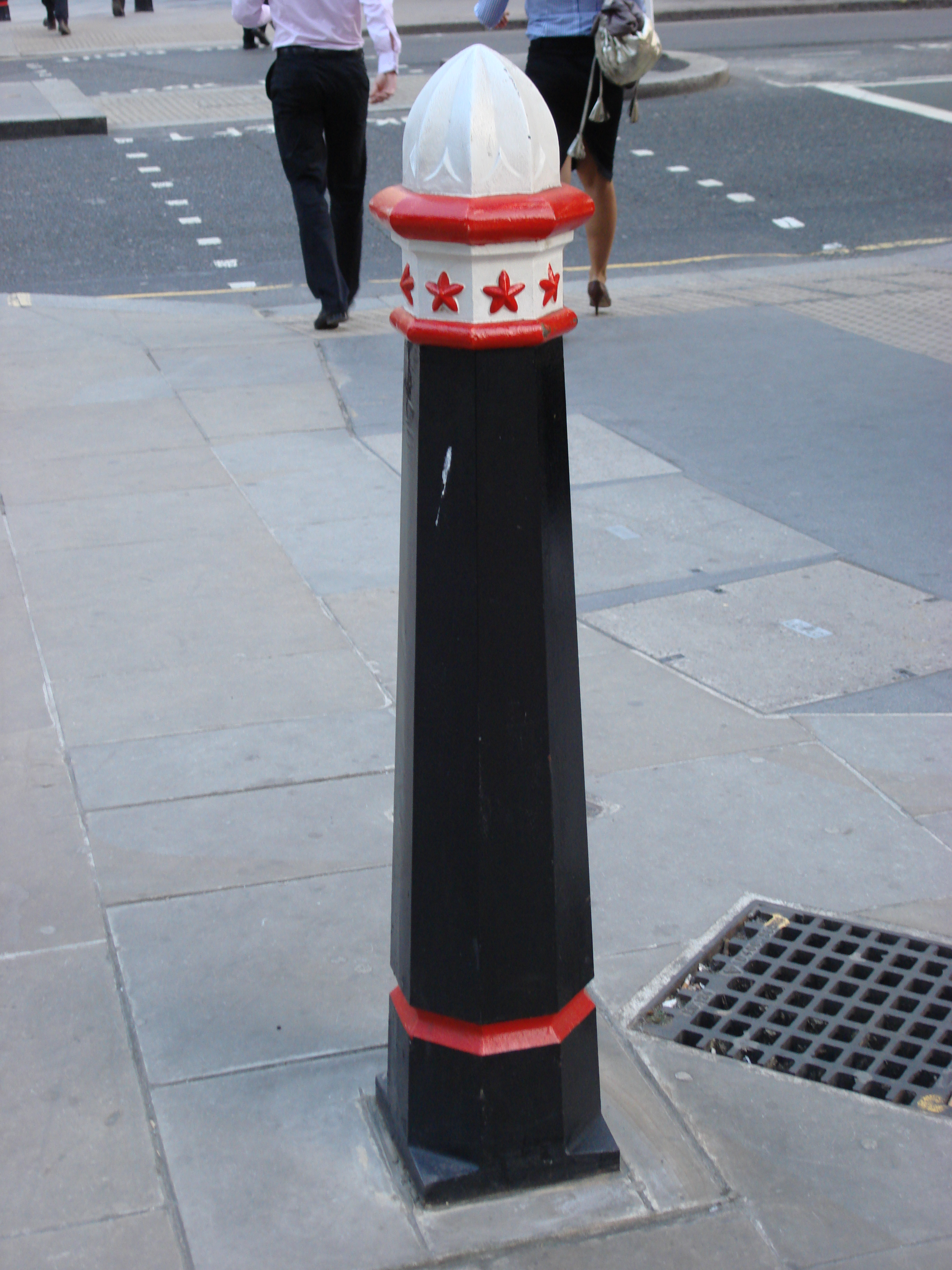
A street bollard in the City of London

Traffic bollards are short, up to 48", pillar-like objects used to obstruct roads for traffic control and pedestrian safety. Bollards work by limiting movements and can narrow available space to control traffic speed.

Bollards can be used for traffic control or as hostile vehicle mitigation to guard against vehicle-ramming attacks. They may be mounted near enough (32-36") to each other that they block ordinary cars/trucks, for instance, but spaced widely enough to permit special-purpose vehicles, bicycles, wheelchairs, and pedestrians to pass through. Bollards may also be used to enclose car-free zones. Bollards and other street furniture can also be used to control overspill parking onto sidewalks and verges.

== Etymology ==
The term is probably related to bole, meaning a tree trunk. The earliest citation given by the Oxford English Dictionary (referring to a maritime bollard) dates from 1844, although an account describing bollards as "huge posts" in a shipyard is also known from 1817. The earliest citation given by the OED referring specifically to a traffic bollard dates from 1925.

== History ==
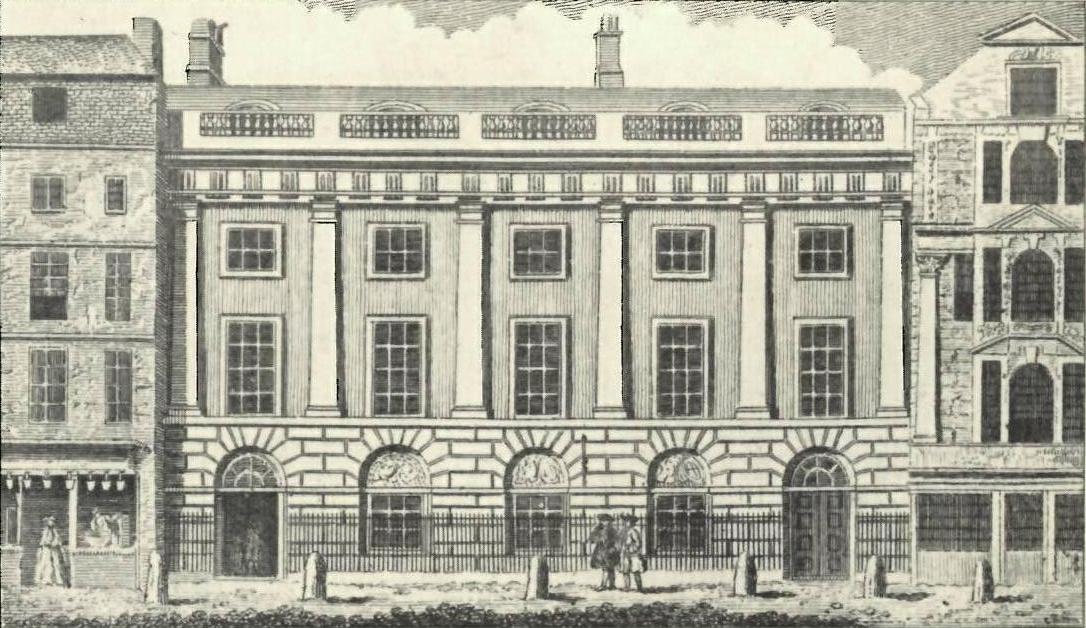
East India House, Leadenhall Street, London: an engraving of 1766. Six bollards stand in front of the building.

Wooden posts were used for basic traffic management from at least the second half of the 17th century. One early well-documented case is that of the "postes and rales in ye King's highway for ye (safety) of all foot passengers" erected in 1671 in the High Street of Old Brentford, Middlesex (part of the London–Bath road). Another is that of "two oak-posts" set up next to the medieval Eleanor cross at Waltham Cross, Hertfordshire, in 1721, at the expense of the Society of Antiquaries of London, "to secure Waltham Cross from injury by Carriages".

Historically, bollards were sometimes created from old cannon, buried muzzle-downwards in the ground.

== Types ==
=== Stationary ===
Stationary bollards permanently remain in place for their useful life.

=== Removable, Retractable, or Reconfigurable ===
Removable, temporary bollards store separately from the permanently installed base until needed.

Bollards can be retracted

- Manually by a key mechanism; useful for requiring less infrastructure.
- Hydraulically by a powered pump and piston; allow for automation and some are spring returned to simplify design.
- Electrically bay an electric linear actuator; allow for automation and no fluids.

The term "robotic bollards" has been applied to traffic barricades capable of reconfiguring themselves into position on a roadway.

== Applications ==
=== Traffic-island bollards ===
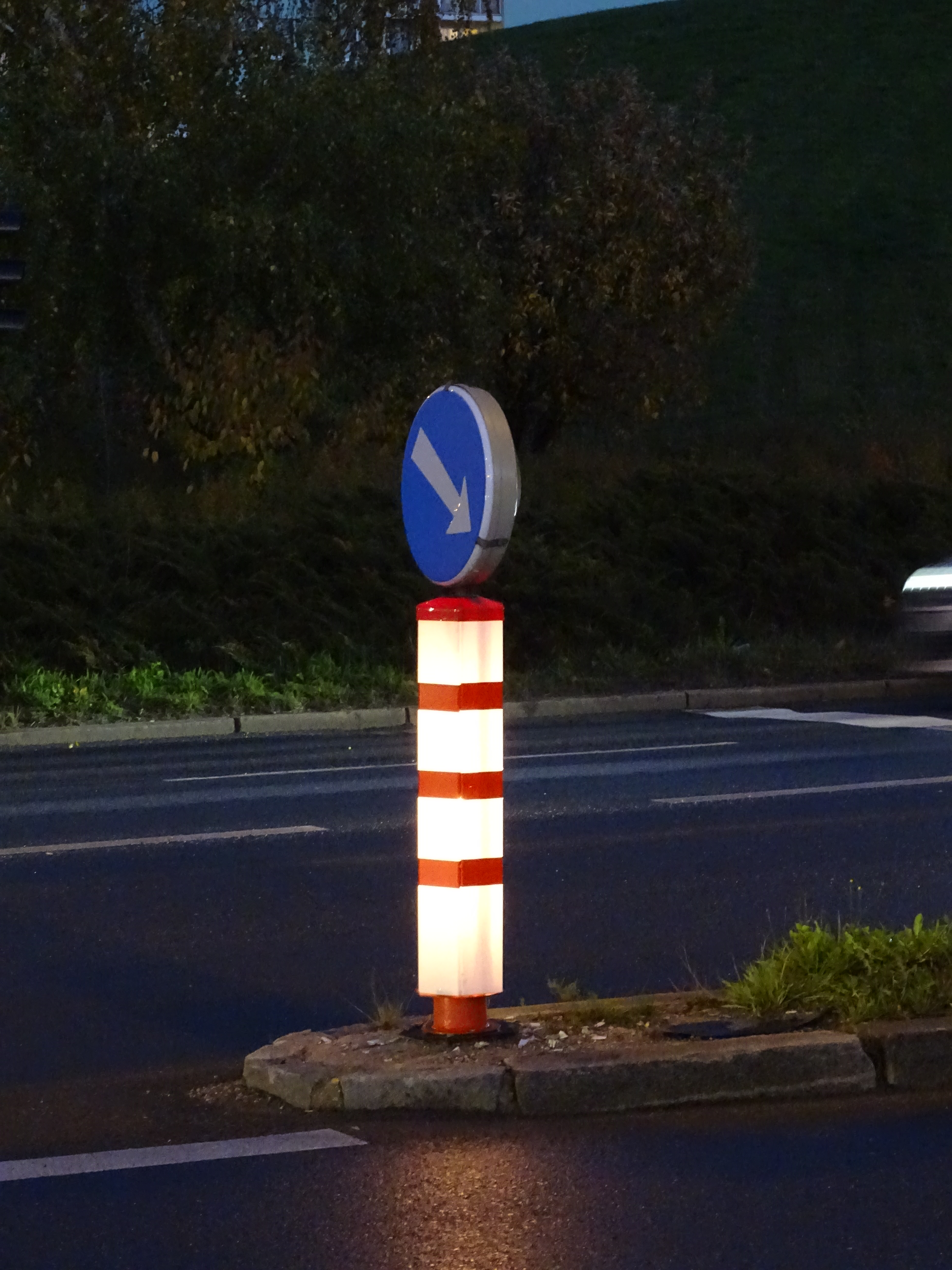
1980s traffic bollard in Prague, Czechia

Traffic bollards are used to highlight traffic islands. They are primarily used at intersections within the splitter islands (a raised or painted area on the approach of a roundabout used to separate entering from exiting traffic, deflect and slow entering traffic, and provide a stopping place for pedestrians crossing the road in two stages).

Illuminated bollards are also used to supplement street signs and street lighting to provide a visual cue to approaching drivers that an obstacle exists ahead during hours of darkness and during periods of low visibility:

Internally illuminated traffic bollards have been used throughout the United Kingdom and Ireland since the 1930s, although the term "bollard" only seems to have been in common use since the late 1940s. An illuminated bollard has a recessed base light unit in the foundation to illuminate the traffic bollard from all angles. The main components are housed below the road or pedestrian surface (typically a concrete surface) so that if a vehicle strikes the traffic bollard the parts below the surface are not damaged. In addition, most new modern traffic bollards installed along UK roadways today are made of materials that make them completely collapsible. When struck by a vehicle at low or high speed, the traffic bollard shell reverts to its original position with minimal or no damage to the unit.

Reflective bollards may also be used; they need no power or maintenance, and can be built to recover to their normal position after being struck.

=== Bell, ball, or rock ===
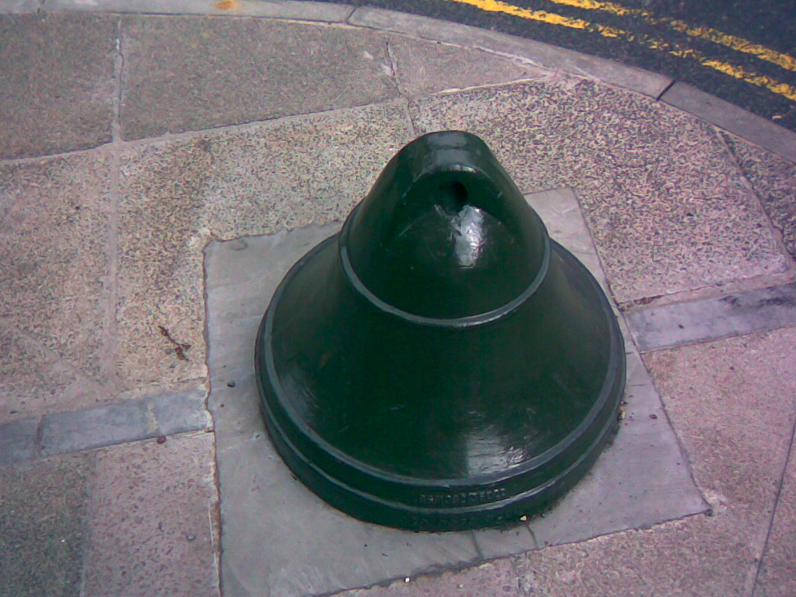
A bell bollard is especially useful to deflect heavy vehicles.

Bell, ball, or rock bollard is a style of short bollard designed to deflect vehicle tires. The wheel mounts the lower part of the bollard and is deflected by its increasing slope.

=== Flexible ===
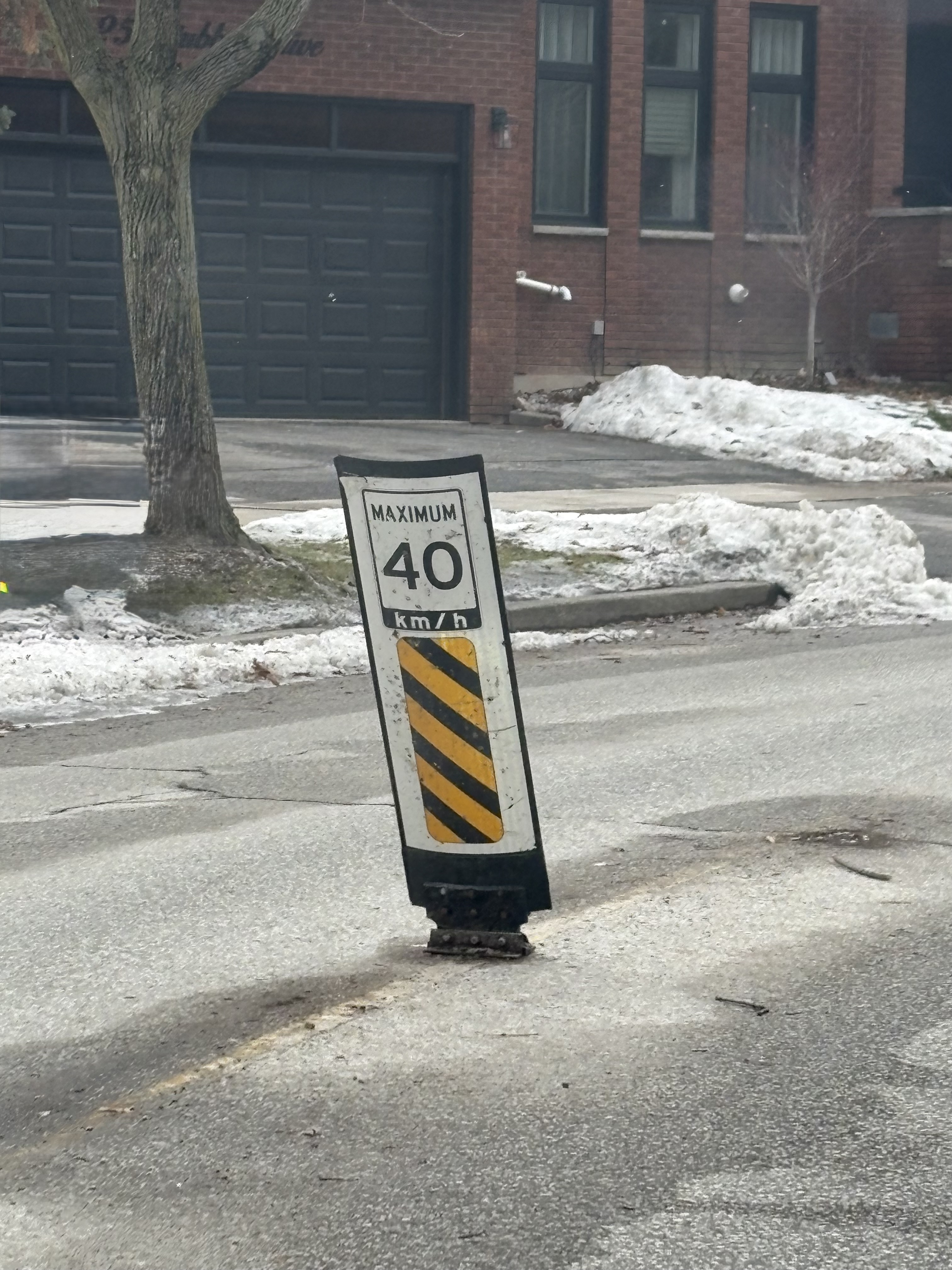
Flexible bollard separating lanes of traffic with speed limit reminder in Toronto, Ontario

Flexible bollards are bollards designed to bend when struck by vehicles. They are typically made from synthetic plastic or rubber that is stiff on its own, but pliable under the weight of a car or truck. When struck, flexible bollards give way to some extent, reducing damage to vehicles and surrounding surfaces, and return to their original, upright position. Some flexible bollards do not provide physical protection from vehicles; rather they offer clear visual guidance for drivers. Other flexible bollards have been designed to provide physical protection as well as reduced damage by incorporating strong elastic materials. These can be all plastic or plastic/steel hybrids but combine varying degrees of stopping power and flexibility.

Flexible bollards are usually used for traffic calming. Israel's Transportation Research Institute found that putting bollards in the gore of highway exit ramps reduced accidents. They are also used to separate the flow of traffic, in bicycle lanes, as well as in residential neighbourhoods to reduce vehicle speeds by restricting road widths.

=== Security ===
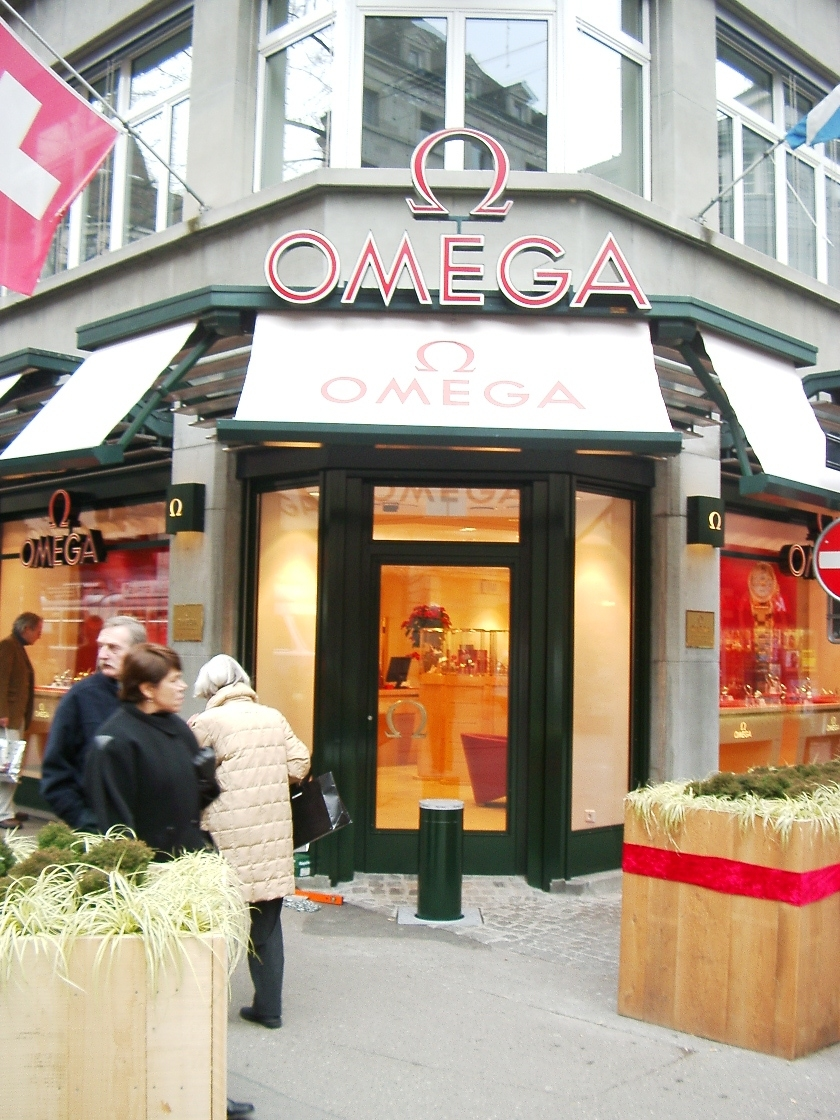
Security bollard in front of a shop doorway, placed to prevent ram-raids

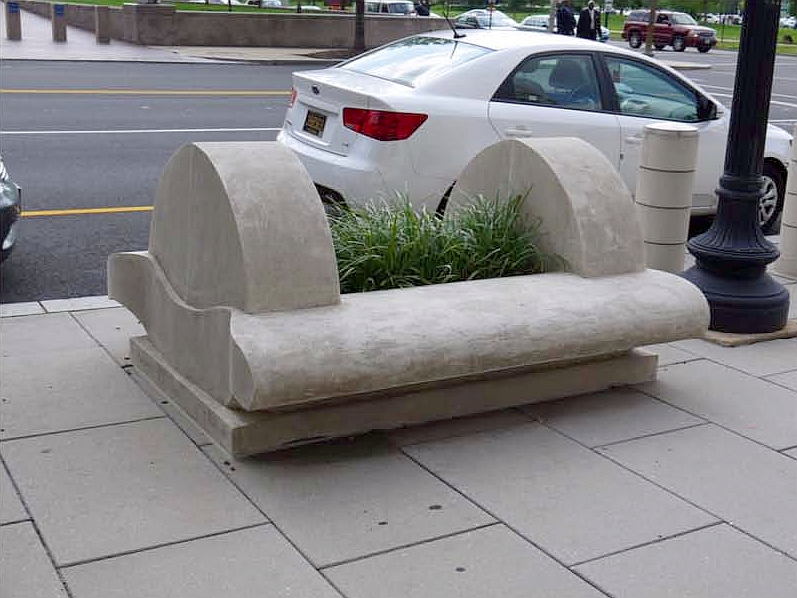
Concrete planters provide protection similar to that of bollards. Washington, DC

Bollards are used to protect buildings and people in public spaces from car ramming attacks and accidental collisions. Related protections against deliberate attacks are wedge barriers and maintenance-free archer barriers.

The bollards are effective protection against deliberate attacks if properly deployed and maintained. In a serious 2025 New Orleans truck attack the attacker took advantage of bollards having been removed for repair, being temporarily replaced by portable gates and parked vehicles, which proved ineffectual.

As collisions also cause damage to vehicles, operators, or the bollards themselves, new bollards have been developed that absorb some of the impact energy, lessening the violence of the collision. Some are made of forgiving plastics, and others are made of steel but fitted with an elastomer to absorb the impact energy.

Bollards are widely used to contribute to safety and security. The American Bar Association (ABA) states that bollards are used to contribute to homeland security. The American National Institute of Building Sciences site—the Whole Building Design Guide (WBDG)—recommends in its Design Guidance that open spaces surrounding and contiguous to buildings be included as integral parts of a security design.

There are two main kinds of security-related bollard:

- High security, crash- and attack-resistant bollards used to protect places at risk of being attacked are impact-tested in accordance with one or more of three major crash test ratings for vehicle barriers. These are PAS 68 (UK), IWA-14 (International) and ASTM F2656-07 or F3016 (US).
- Low security, non-crash-resistant bollards. According to the National Institute of Building Sciences, non-crash-resistant bollards are "perceived impediments to access" and address actions of two groups:
  - Law-abiding persons who comply with civil prescriptions of behavior as defined by the manner in which bollards are put to use
  - Potentially threatening and disruptive persons for whom bollard applications are proscriptive by announcing their behavior is anticipated, and that additional levels of security await them.

=== Parking bollards ===
Bollards have become common use for reserving parking spots from unauthorized vehicles. Parking bollards are typically situated in the centre of a parking spot as a physical obstruction. They then fold either manually or automatically to admit authorized users. These bollards are often used in smaller parking lots such as visitor parking or corporate parking lots, as an alternative to boom gates that would typically prevent unauthorized vehicle from entering the parking lot.

=== Other applications ===
The National Clearinghouse for Educational Facilities (NCEF), managed by the National Institute of Building Sciences (NIBS), cited three dozen applications of bollards. Bollards have been used in residential driveways to prevent car theft.

== Artwork ==
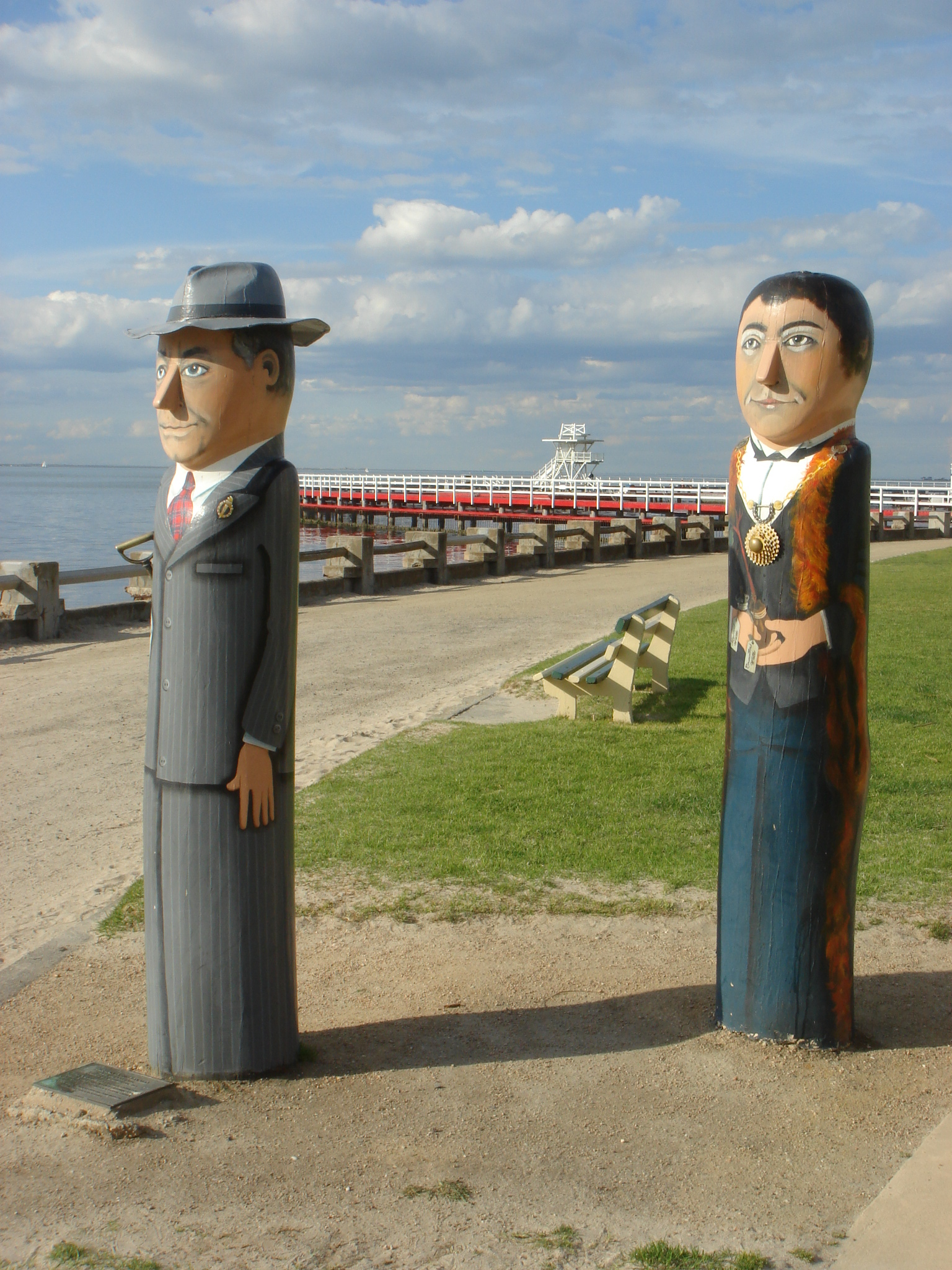
Figural bollard sculptures in Geelong, Victoria

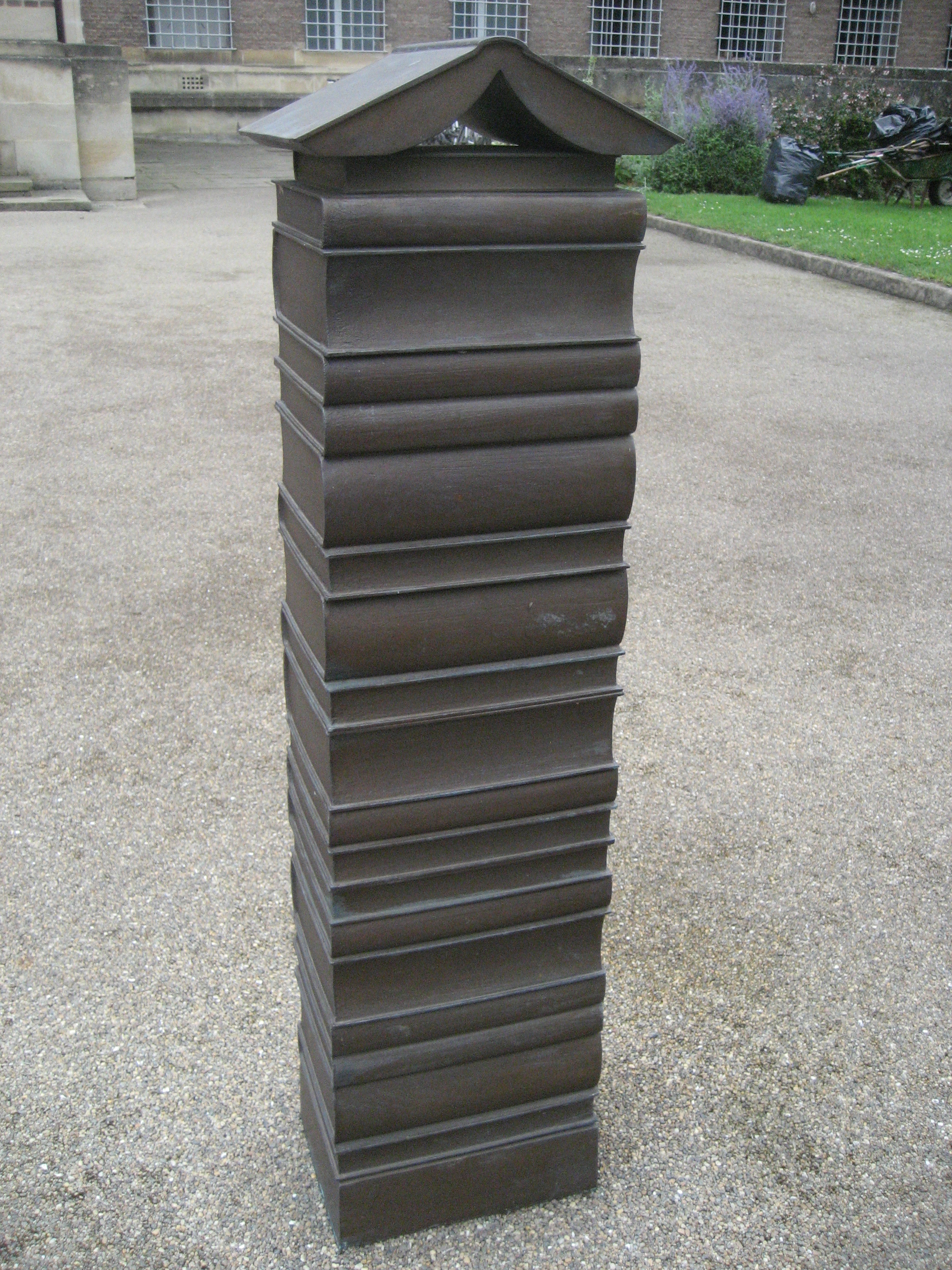
Ex libris bollard outside Cambridge University Library, by Harry Gray

In Geelong, Victoria, Australia, decorative bollards, sculpted and painted by Jan Mitchell, are placed around the city to enhance the landscape as a form of outdoor public sculpture. Usually they are made of timber, minimally modified from the traditionally cylindrical, wooden, maritime bollard shape, but brightly painted to resemble human figures. Such figures – which may be historical or contemporary, particular or generic – are sited singly or in clusters along the waterfront and in other areas where people gather. Decorative bollards have become a well-known feature of the city of Geelong and reflect its history as a major Australian port.

In Antwerp, Belgium, artist Eddy Gabriel transformed a bollard to look like a toadstool in 1993. This example was followed by other artists, turning the quayside of the river Scheldt into a street art gallery.

In Norwich, England, a set of 21 bollards was installed in 2008 in the Lanes area north of City Hall, designed by artist Oliver Creed and commissioned by the City Council as part of a regeneration programme. They are coloured "madder red", in reference to the red dye extracted from the madder plant and used for dying cloth, one of the city's major industries during the 16th century; and they bear bronze finials also alluding to local history. 10 of these depict the madder plant, while the other 11 have unique designs, usually relevant to the specific location in which the bollard is placed, including a scene of sheep-shearing, a Green Man, a swan's head in Swan Lane, and so on.

On the forecourt of Cambridge University Library, England, a line of 14 bronze bollards made to resemble piles of books was installed in 2009. This work, Ex Libris, was created by sculptor Harry Gray. The ten outer bollards are static, but the "books" making up the four central bollards can be swivelled, so that the lettering on their spines aligns to form the Latin phrase Ex Libris ("from/out of the books"), commonly used on bookplates.

== US fire regulations ==
According to the International Fire Code (IFC-2009) and the American National Fire Protection Association Fire Code 1 (NFPA-1) all new buildings or renovated buildings must have fire access roadways to accommodate fire apparatus and crews and other first responders. Consequently, the choice of bollard styles must conform with the NFPA's Code 1710. Bollards designs must take into account the time taken to remove or collapse them to allow first responders entry to the access roadway.

== Gallery ==
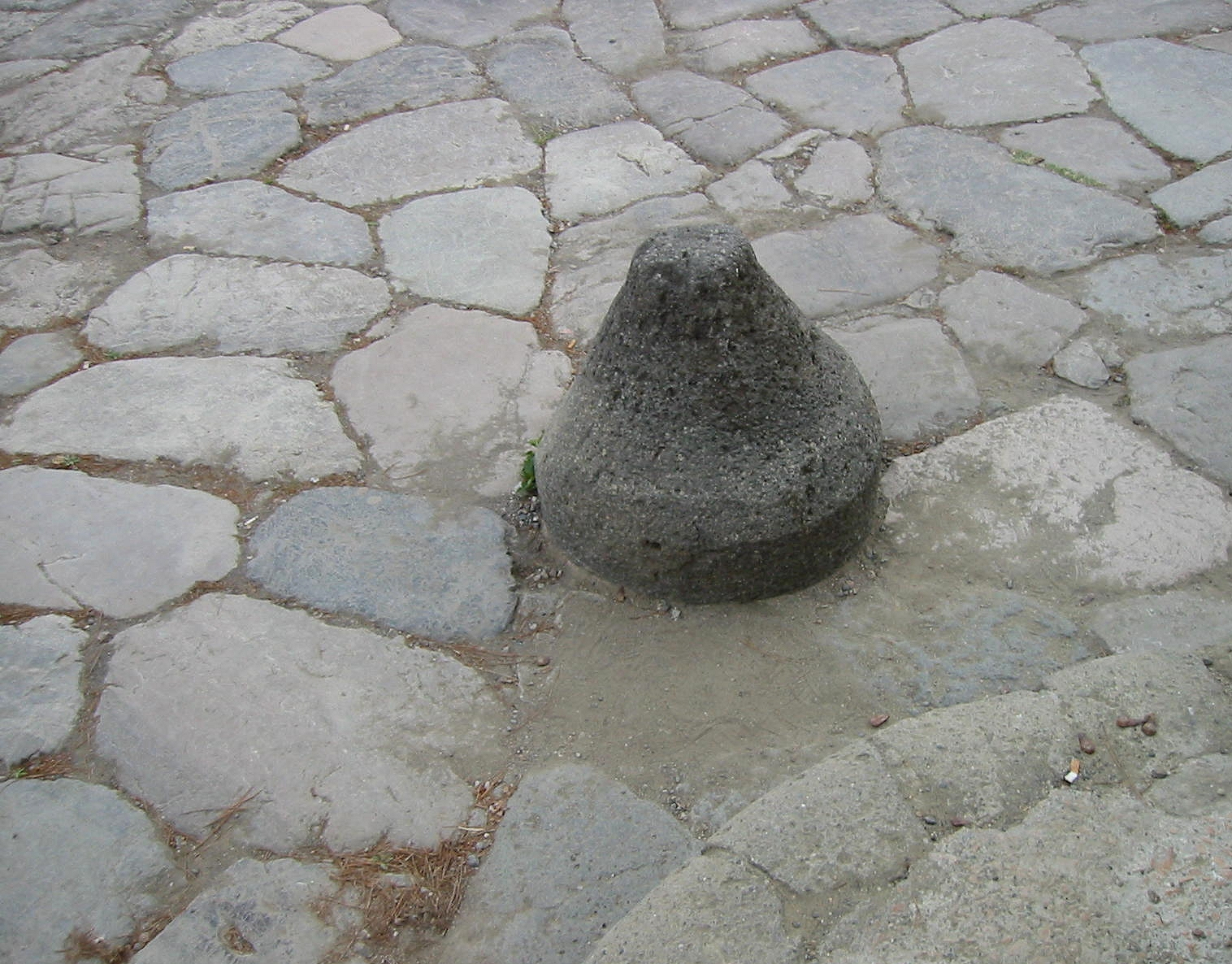
Ancient Roman bell bollard in Herculaneum, Italy

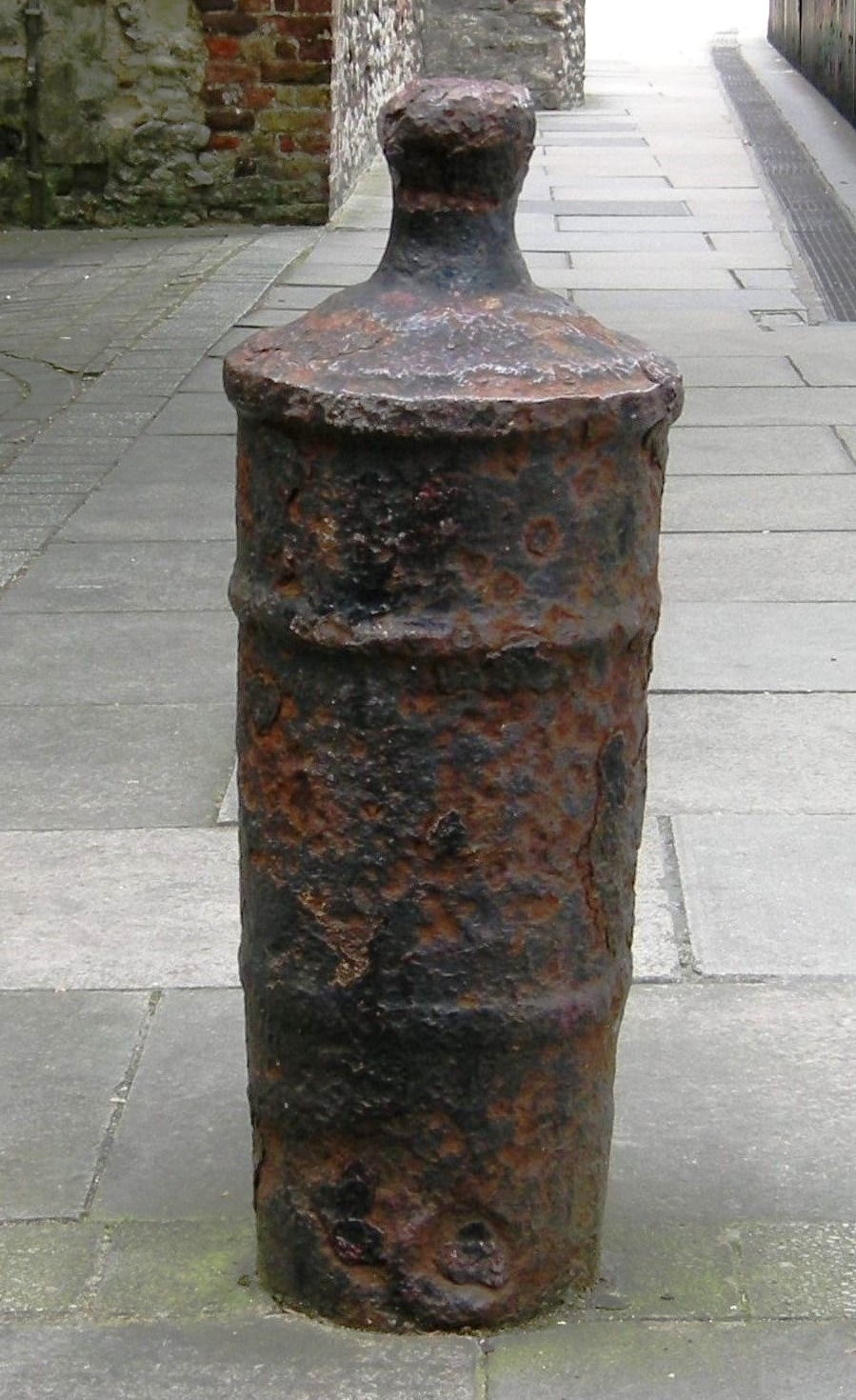
Old cannon used as bollard, outside the church of St Helen's Bishopsgate, London

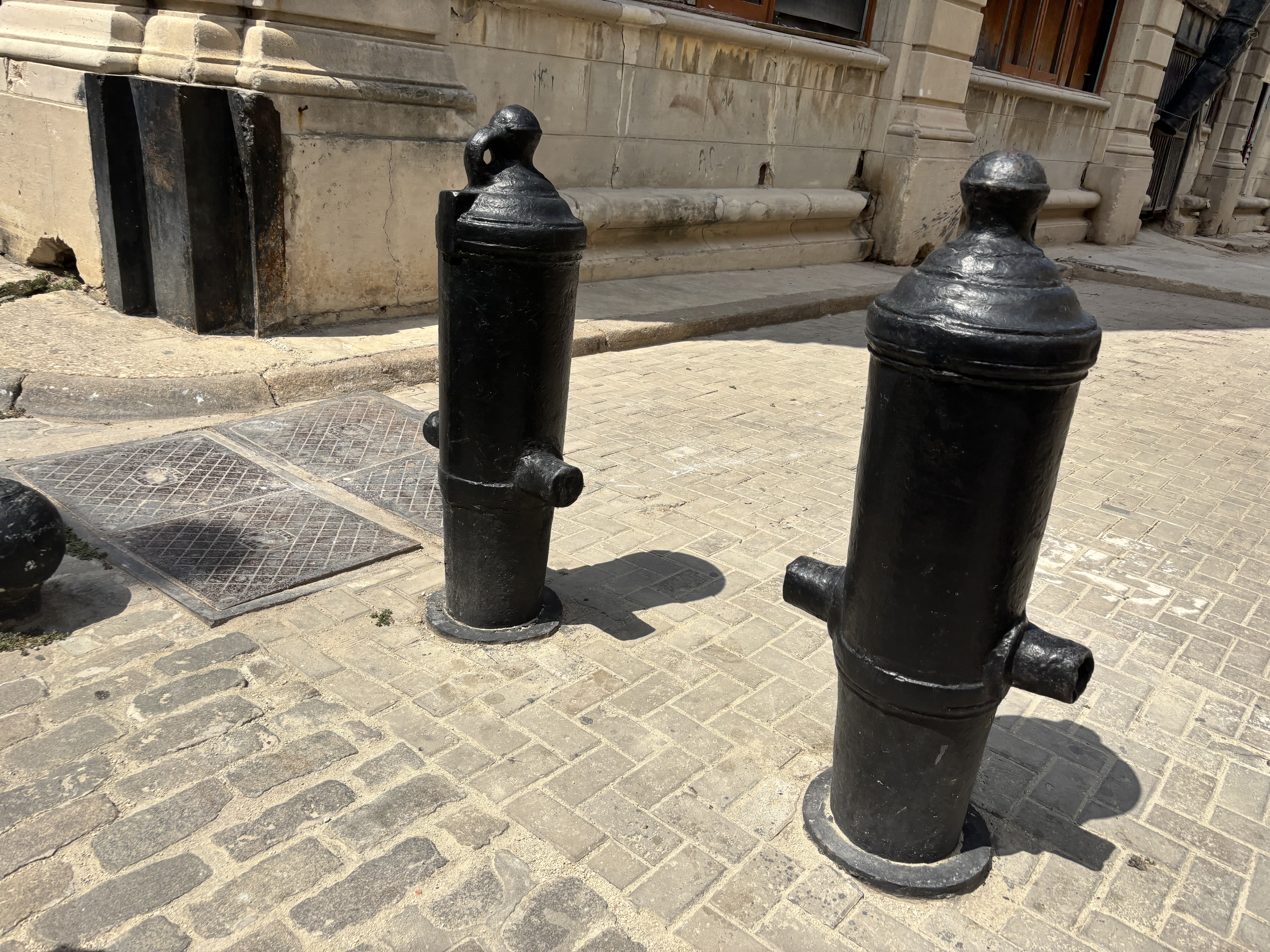
Old cannons used as bollards, in Havana, Cuba

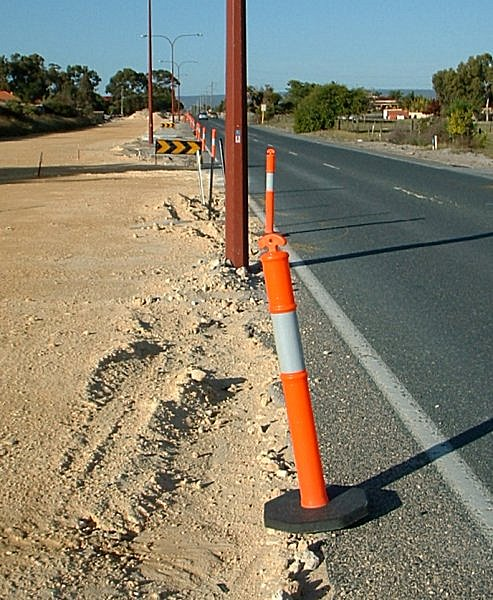
Bollards can be temporary and portable, such as this traffic control bollard separating the road from the worksite

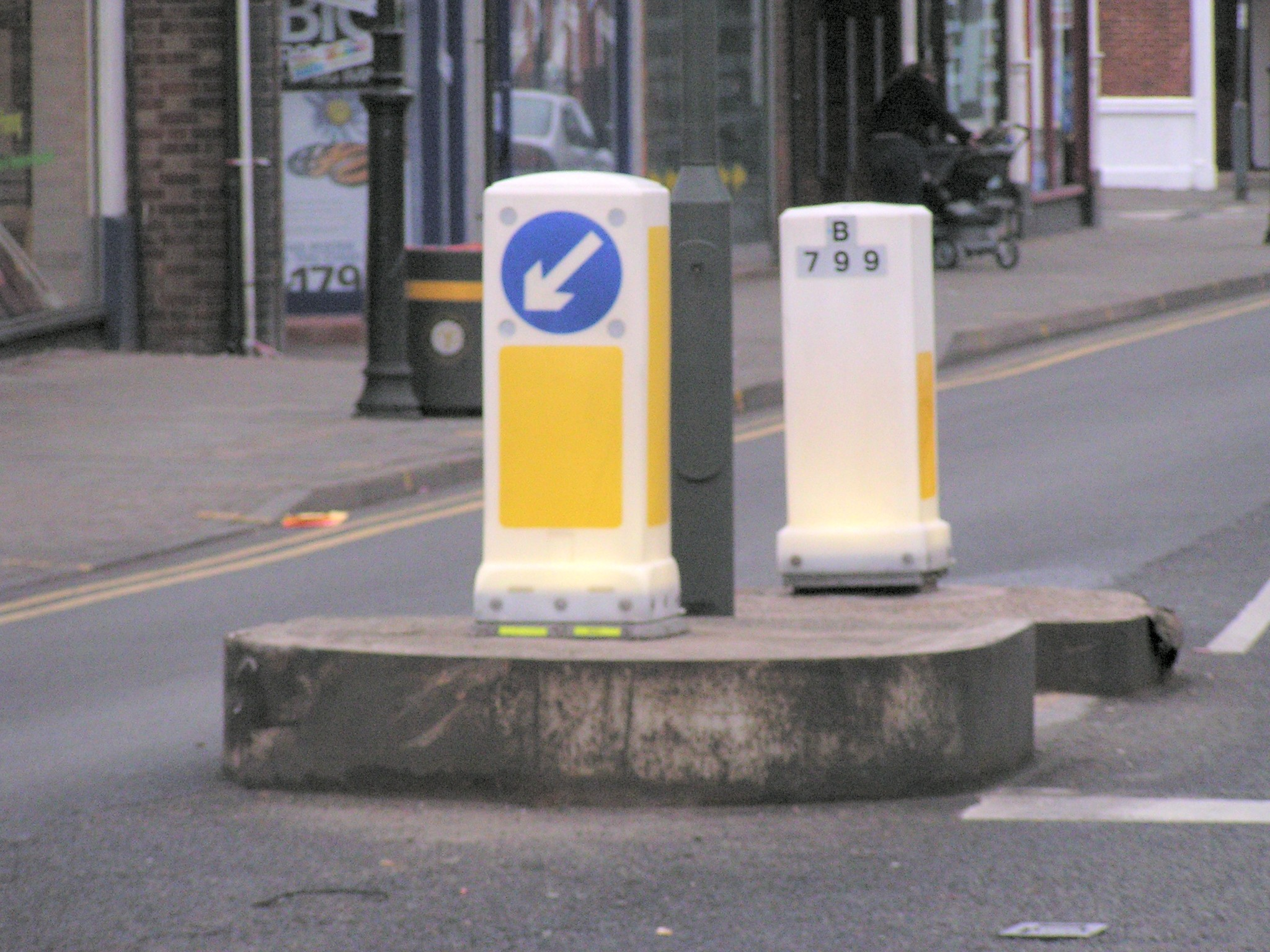
Internally illuminated traffic bollards direct vehicles to the appropriate side of an island in the United Kingdom

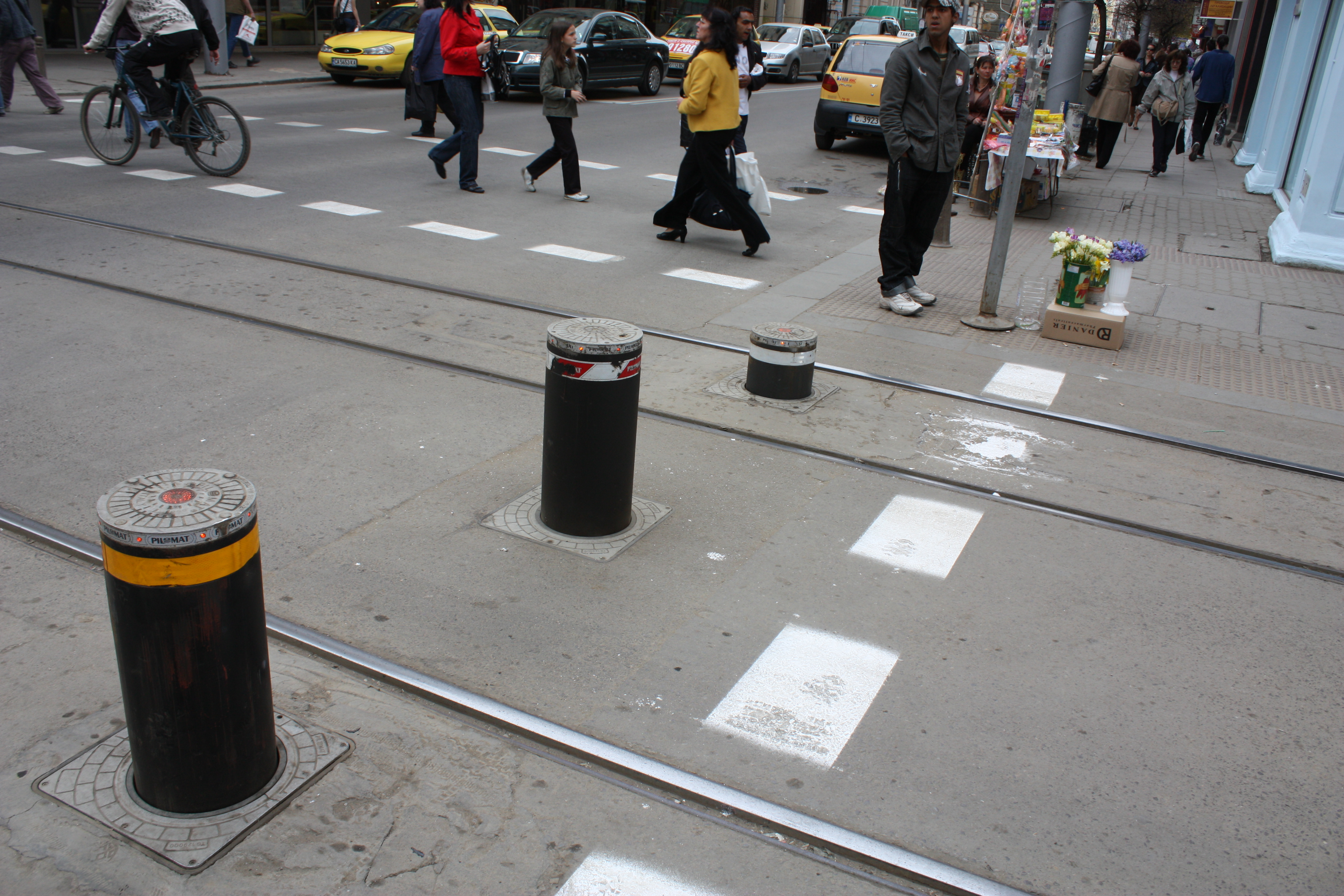
Rising bollards can retract to allow passage of streetcars in Sofia, Bulgaria

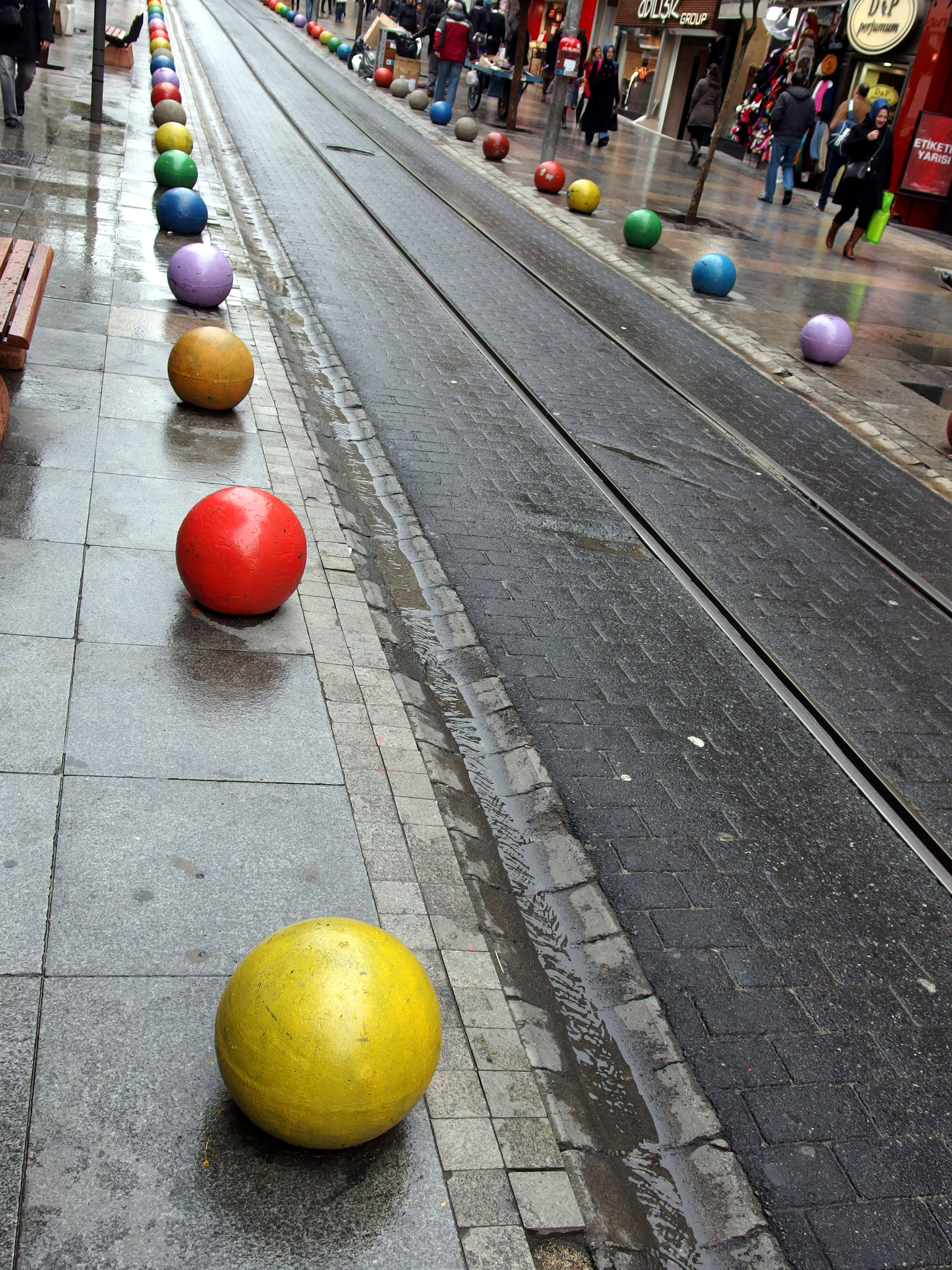
Cannonball-shaped bollards in Istanbul, Turkey

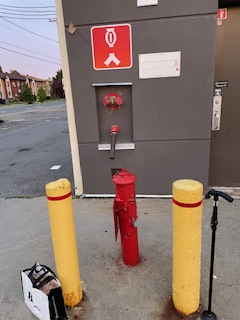
2 bollards protecting a fire hydrant in Chomedey, Quebec, Canada

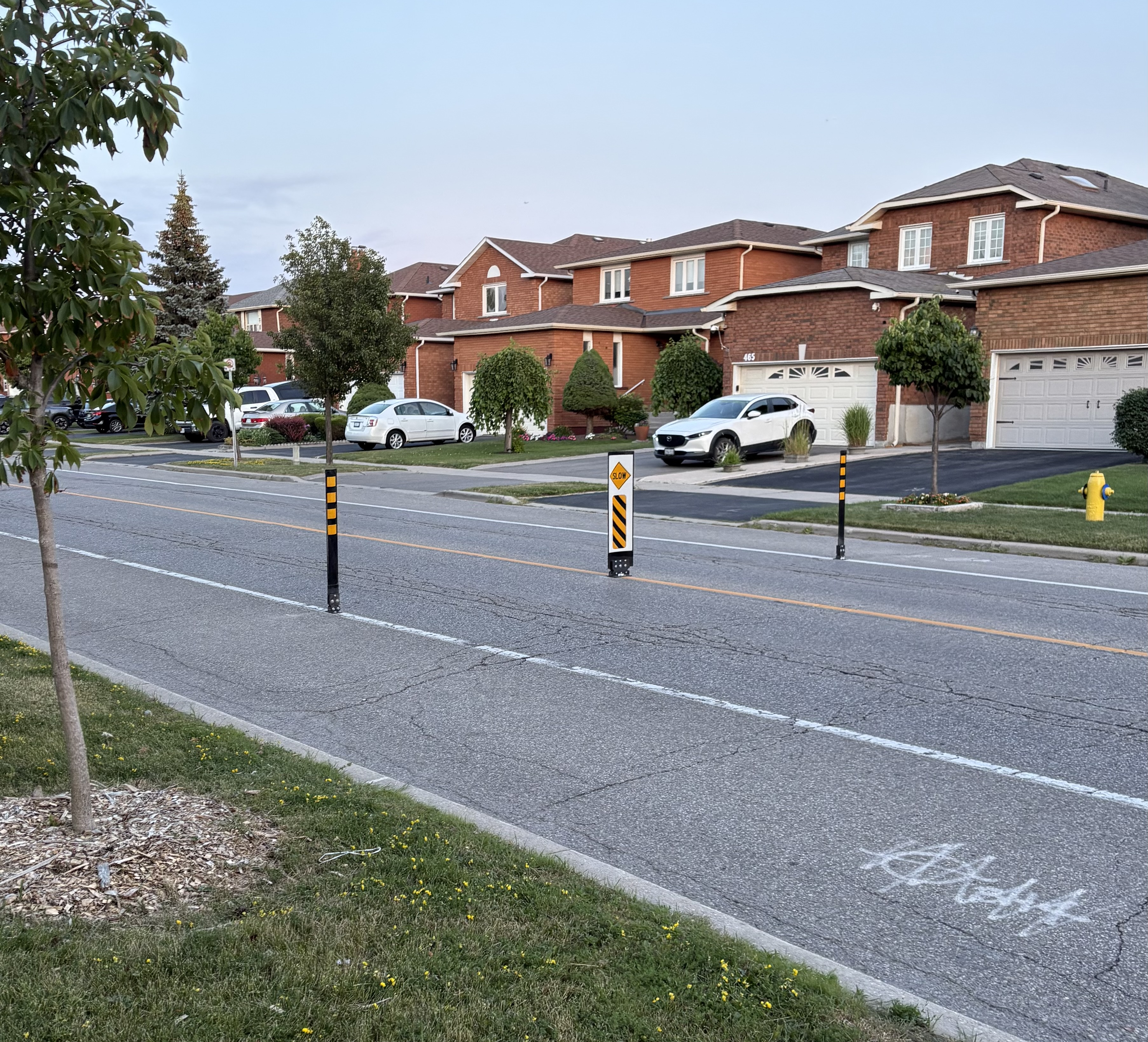
Traffic bollards in Vaughan, Ontario narrowing lanes of traffic to force vehicles to slow down on a residential thoroughfare

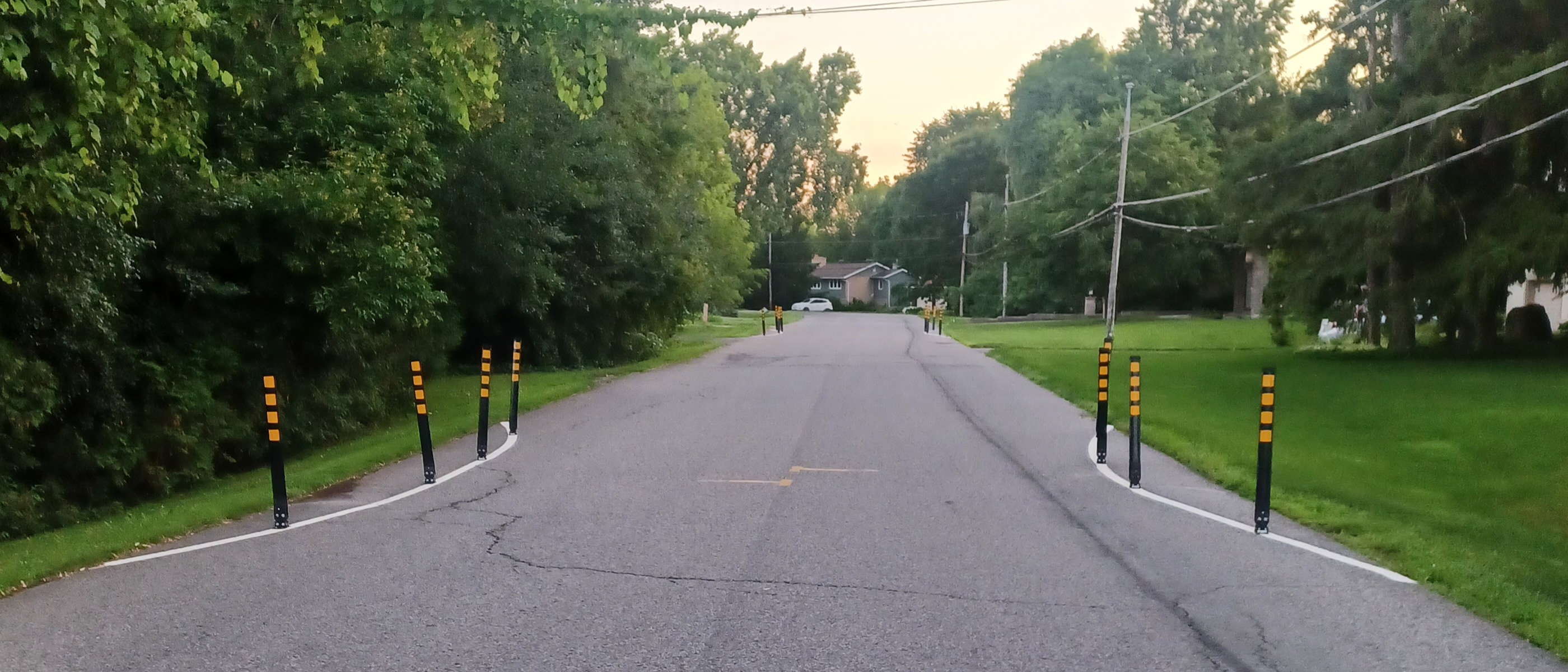
A suburban residential street in Ottawa, Ontario narrowed with painted "bumpers" and bollards to encourage lower driving speeds and discourage passing.

== See also ==
- Amsterdammertje
- Guard rail
- Guard stone
- Jersey barrier
- Milestone
- Sump buster
- Traffic barrier
- Traffic cone
