= Diamond Cove, Calgary =

Diamond Cove
- Neighbourhood
- Location of Diamond Cove in Calgary
- Coordinates: 50°56′42″N 114°01′21″W
- Country: Canada
- Province: Alberta
- City: Calgary
- Quadrant: SE
- Ward: 14
- Established: 1973
- Annexed: 1961

Government
  - Mayor: Jeromy Farkas
  - Administrative body: Calgary City Council
  - Councillor: Landon Johnston (Independent)

Area
  - Total: 0.439 km^{2} (0.169 sq mi)
- Elevation: 1,030 m (3,380 ft)

Population (2012)
  - Total: 699
  - Average Income: $120,196
- Website: Queensland/Diamond Cove Community Association

Diamond Cove is a small residential neighbourhood in the southeast quadrant of Calgary, Alberta. It is bounded to the north by Anderson Road and Deerfoot Trail, to the east by the Bow River, to the south by Queensland, and to the west by Bow Bottom Trail.

The land was annexed to the City of Calgary in 1961 and the neighbouring community of Queensland was established in 1973. Diamond Cove was established as an estate community with construction commencing in 1989, however the community was officially recognised in 1991. The community has a dedicated entrance, accessed from Bow Bottom Trail about 1.5 km north of Canyon Meadows Drive.

It is represented in the Calgary City Council by the Ward 14 councillor.

== Demographics ==
In the City of Calgary's 2012 municipal census, Diamond Cove had a population of 699 living in 271 dwellings, a -2.4% increase from its 2011 population of 716. With a land area of 0.5 km^{2} (0.19 sq mi), it had a population density of 1,400/km^{2} (3,600/sq mi) in 2012.

Residents in this community had a median household income of $120,196 in 2000, and there were 3.3% low income residents living in the neighbourhood. As of 2000, 17.9% of the residents were immigrants. A proportion of 3.3% of the buildings were condominiums or apartments, and 3.3% of the housing was used for renting.

Pop. Overtime
| Year | Population |
|---|---|
| 2014 | 713 |
| 2015 | 711 |
| 2016 | 727 |
| 2017 | 727 |
| 2018 | 709 |
| 2019 | 690 |
| 2021 | 625 |

== Crime ==
Crime Data
| Year | Crime Rate (/100 pop.) |
|---|---|
| 2018 | 1.4 |
| 2019 | 1.3 |
| 2020 | 1.1 |
| 2021 | 1.9 |
| 2022 | 1.1 |
| 2023 | 1.1 |

== Education ==
The community is served by Haultain Memorial Elementary and Wilma Hansen Junior High School public schools.

== See also ==
- List of neighbourhoods in Calgary
