= Queensland, Calgary =

Queensland
- Neighbourhood
- Location of Queensland in Calgary
- Coordinates: 50°56′17″N 114°01′22″W
- Country: Canada
- Province: Alberta
- City: Calgary
- Quadrant: SE
- Ward: 14
- Established: 1973
- Annexed: 1961

Government
  - Mayor: Jeromy Farkas
  - Administrative body: Calgary City Council
  - Councillor: Landon Johnston (Independent)

Area
  - Total: 1.8 km^{2} (0.69 sq mi)
- Elevation: 1,030 m (3,380 ft)

Population (2006)
  - Total: 5,180
  - Average Income: $60,175
- Website: Queensland/Diamond Cove Community Association

Queensland is a residential neighbourhood in the southeast quadrant of Calgary, Alberta. It is bounded to the north by the community of Diamond Cove, to the east by the Bow River and Fish Creek Provincial Park, to the south by Canyon Meadows Drive, and to the west by Bow Bottom Trail.

It is represented in the Calgary City Council by the Ward 14 councillor.

== History ==
The land that Queensland would be later developed on was annexed by the city of Calgary in 1961, in which it initially developed in 1973. Most of the neighborhood was developed throughout 1973-1975, however a small section of land in the southeast corner of Queensland was not developed until the early 1980s.

Queensland was originally named Queensland Downs, but was renamed at an unknown date to just Queensland.

== Demographics ==
In the City of Calgary's 2012 municipal census, Queensland had a population of 4,771 living in 1,894 dwellings, a -2.2% increase from its 2011 population of 4,877. With a land area of 1.6 km^{2} (0.62 sq mi), it had a population density of 2,980/km^{2} (7,720/sq mi) in 2012.

Residents in this community had a median household income of $60,175 in 2000, and there were 13.2% low income residents living in the neighbourhood. As of 2000, 16.2% of the residents were immigrants. A proportion of 2.4% of the buildings were condominiums or apartments, and 15.4% of the housing was used for renting.

Pop. Overtime
Year	Population
2014	4984
2015	4956
2016	4823
2017	4787
2018	4683
2019	4743
2021	4585

== Education ==
The community is served by Haultain Memorial Elementary and Wilma Hansen Junior High School public schools.

== See also ==
- List of neighbourhoods in Calgary
