= List of building materials =

This is a list of building materials.

Many types of building materials are used in the construction work-field to create buildings and structures. These categories of materials and products are used by architects and construction project managers to specify the materials and methods used for building projects.

Some building materials like cold rolled steel framing are considered modern methods of construction, over the traditionally slower methods like blockwork and timber.

== Catalogs ==
Catalogs distributed by architectural product suppliers are typically organized into these groups.

Material (articles)	Main article or category
Cold rolled steel framing: Steel framing systems; Mezzanine floors; Purlin and cladding rails; Portable buildings; Prefabricated buildings	Steel frames
Compressed earth block, mud brick, rammed earth	Category:Appropriate technology
Concrete: Hempcrete (biocomposite)	Category:Concrete
Conveyor systems: Elevator or "lift"; Escalator	Category:Vertical transport devices
Composites	Category:Composite materials
Thermal protection: Building insulation	Category:Thermal protection
Moisture protection: Building envelope; Conformal coating; Damp (structural); Housewrap	Category:Moisture protection
Doors: Stile and rail, raised panel, wood clad; Access, sliding glass doors, tambour; Folding doors, garage door, storefront; Door hardware	Category:Doors; Category:Door furniture
Electrical systems and equipment: AC power plugs and sockets; Circuit breaker; Electrical connector; Electrical wiring; Switches	Category:Electrical systems
Surface finishing: Plaster and gypsum board; Cement render; Ceramic tile, quarry tile, pavers, mosaic; Dropped ceiling, coffered ceiling; Flooring – wide plank, terrazzo, carpet; Marble; Wall covering, wallpaper, acoustic; Paint, wood stain, faux finishing; Staff – a type of artificial stone; Stucco; Wood finishing	Category:Wood finishing materials Category:Wood finishing techniques: also "gyp-board" or "drywall"; Category:Roofs; Category:Ceilings; Category:Floors; Category:Walls; House painting
Fire suppression equipment	Category:Fire suppression
Furnishings: Furniture; Glassware; Tableware	Category:Furniture
HVAC (Heating, ventilation and air conditioning)	Category:Heating, ventilation, and air conditioning
Masonry, mortar (masonry), grout: Adobe, brick and brickwork, glass brick, terra cotta; Artificial stone; Cinder block or concrete block; Noxer block; Stone dry stacked or mortar set; Urbanite – broken-up concrete	Category:Masonry: Category:Bricks; also: "Concrete Masonry Units" (CMU); Category:Stone (material)
Metals: Structural steel: I-beam and column; Rebar; Wire rope and cables; Metal joist, decking, framing, trusses; Metal fabrications; Stairway, ladder, railing, grating, Strut channel, roofing (including copper); Decorative metal	Category:Metals
"Openings" include Doors and Windows	Category:Doors
Plastics	Category:Plastics
Plumbing fixtures and equipment	Category:Plumbing
Building safety	Category:Safety codes
Security systems	Category:Security
Specialties	Category:Architectural design
Telecommunications equipment	Category:Telecommunications
Wood, carpentry: Rough carpentry (unfinished); Heavy timbers, log home, timber framing or "post and beam"; Bamboo; Engineered wood, dimensional lumber; Stud, joist, rafter; Treated lumber and wood decking; Sheathing, subflooring, panelling; Plywood, shiplap, tongue and groove; Oriented strand board; Parallel strand lumber or "PSL"; Glued laminated timber or "glulam"; Finish carpentry or "architectural woodwork"; Veneer, plastic laminate, wood panel; Case-building products; Millwork, bookcase, cabinets; Ornamental woodwork; Trim, molding or "moulding"; Chair rail, baseboard, casing, sill	Category:Wood Category:Woodworking; List of woods
Windows: Casement, double hung, bay window; Curtainwall, skylight, dormer	Category:Windows

== Industry standards ==
The Construction Specifications Institute maintains the following industry standards:

- MasterFormat – 50 standard divisions of building materials - 2004 edition (current in 2009)
- 16 Divisions – Original 16 divisions of building materials

== See also ==
- Category: Building materials
- Alternative natural materials
- Glass in green buildings
- Green building and wood
- List of commercially available roofing material
- List of tools and equipment
- Red List building materials
- Outline of construction § Materials and equipment

== Sources ==
- Building Materials: Dangerous Properties of Products in MasterFormat Divisions 7 and 9 - H. Leslie Simmons, Richard J. Lewis, Richard J. Lewis (Sr.) - Google Books
- Building Materials - P.C. Varghese - Google Books
- Architectural Building Materials - Salvan, George S. - Google Books
- Durability of Building Materials and Components 8: Service Life and Asset Management - Michael A. Lacasse, Dana J. Vanier - Google Books
- Durability of Building Materials and Components - J. M. Baker - Google Books
- Understanding Green Building Materials - Traci Rose Rider, Stacy Glass, Jessica McNaughton - Google Books
- Heat-Air-Moisture Transport: Measurements on Building Materials - Phālgunī Mukhopādhyāẏa, M. K. Kumaran - Google Books
