= Awning =

Fabric building structure providing shade

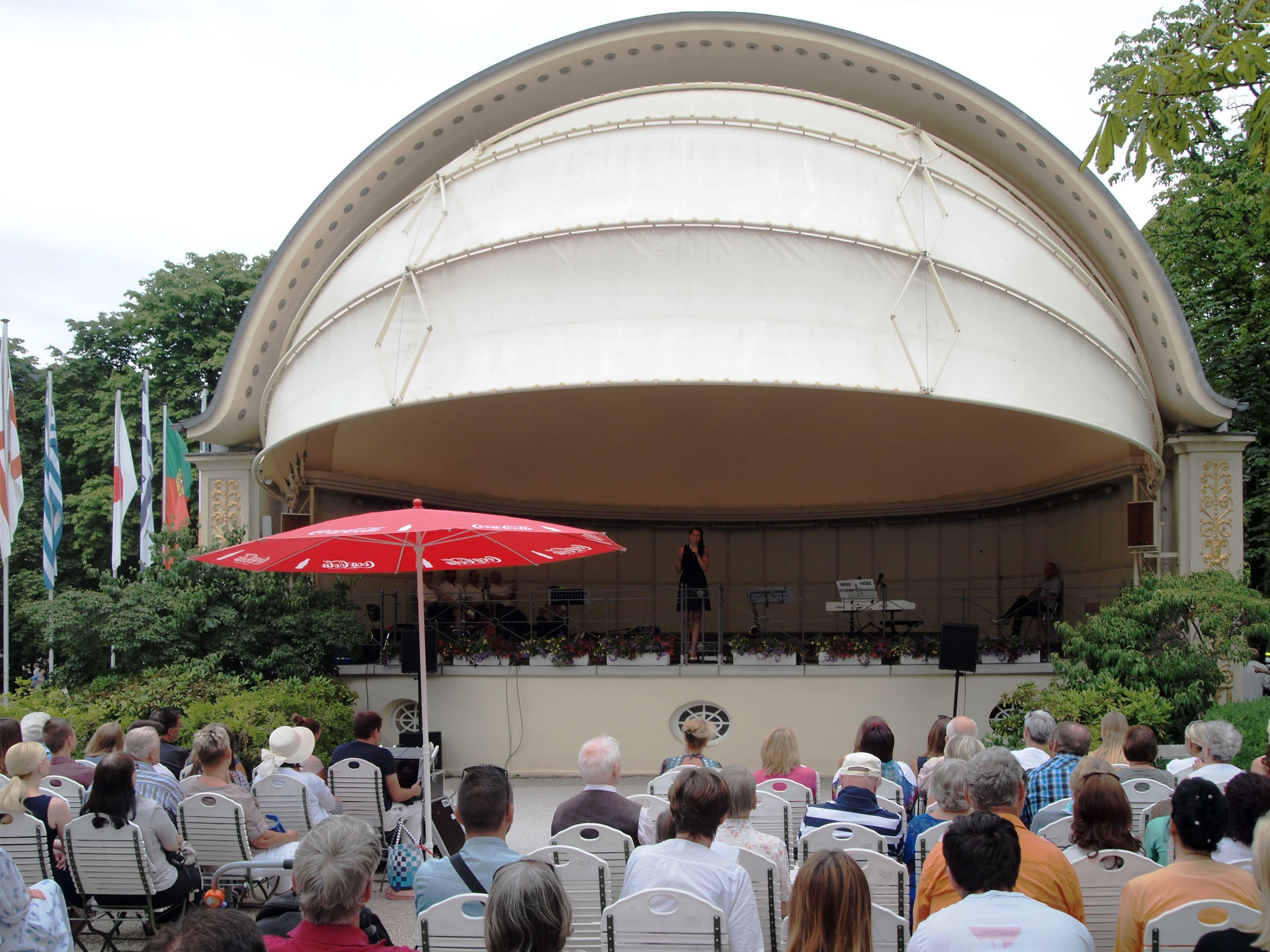
Spherical awning of a bandshell

An awning or overhang is an architectural projection attached to and supported by a building, consisting of a lightweight frame with a covering. It is used to provide shade and protection from the weather, and may also serve decorative or signage functions. It is typically composed of canvas woven of acrylic, cotton or polyester yarn, or vinyl laminated to polyester fabric that is stretched tightly over a light structure of aluminium, iron or steel, possibly wood or transparent material (used to cover solar thermal panels in the summer, but that must allow as much light as possible in the winter). The configuration of this structure is something of a truss, space frame or planar frame. Awnings are also often constructed of aluminium understructure with aluminium sheeting. These aluminium awnings are often used when a fabric awning is not a practical application where snow load as well as wind loads may be a factor.

== History ==
=== Ancient world ===
Awnings (or marquees) were first used by the ancient Egyptian and Syrian civilizations. They are described as "woven mats" that shaded market stalls and homes. A Roman poet Lucretius, in 50 BC, said in his poem De rerum natura "Linen-awning, stretched, over mighty theatres, gives forth at times, a cracking roar, when much 'tis beaten about, betwixt the poles and cross-beams".

Among the most significant awnings in the ancient world was the velarium, the massive complex of retractable shade structures that could be deployed above the seating areas of the Roman Colosseum. Made of linen shadecloths, timber framing, iron sockets and rope, the system could effectively shade about one-third of the arena and seating; another third could be shaded by the high surrounding walls, providing a majority of seats some shade on a blinding afternoon. It is believed that sailors, with their background in sailmaking and rigging were employed to build, maintain and operate the velarium.

=== Early 19th century ===
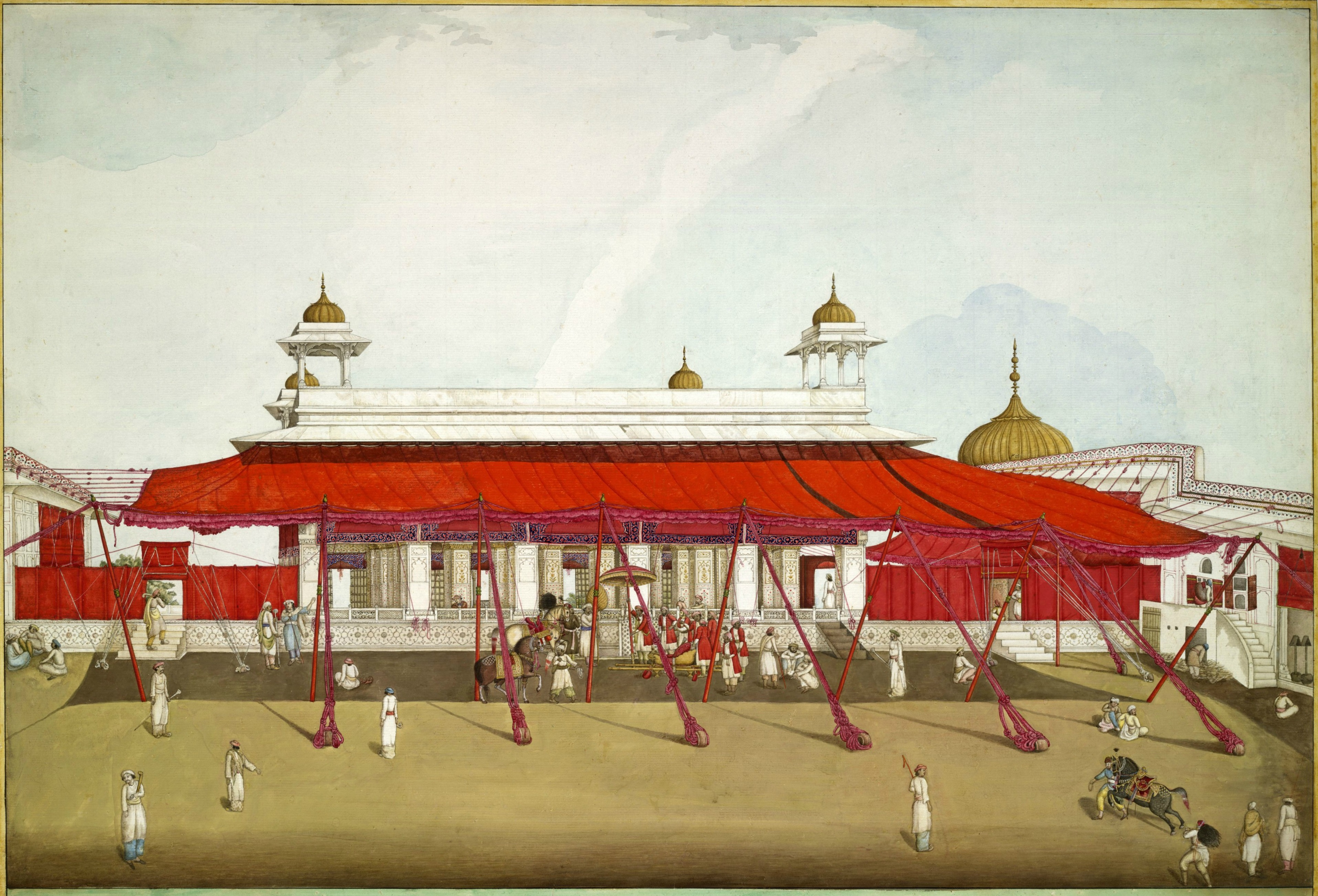
Diwan-i-Khas, Red Fort, Delhi with red awnings or shamianas, in 1817

Awnings became common during the first half of the 19th century. At that time they consisted of timber or cast iron posts set along the sidewalk edge and linked by a front cross bar. To lend support to larger installations, angled rafters linked the front cross bar to the building facade. The upper end of the canvas was connected to the facade with nails, with grommets and hooks, or by lacing the canvas to a head rod bolted to the facade. The other (projecting) end of the canvas was draped over or laced to a front bar with the edge often hanging down to form a valance. On ornate examples, metal posts were adorned with filigree and the tops decorated with spear ends, balls or other embellishments. On overcast days or when rain did not threaten, the covering was often rolled up against the building facade; during the winter months proper maintenance called for the removal and storage of awnings. Photographs from the mid-19th century often show the bare framework, suggesting that the covering was extended only when necessary. Canvas duck was the predominant awning fabric, a strong, closely woven cotton cloth used for centuries to make tents and sails.

Awnings became a common feature in the years after the American Civil War. Iron plumbing pipe, which was quickly adapted for awning frames, became widely available and affordable as a result of mid-century industrialization. It was a natural material for awning frames, easily bent and threaded together to make a range of different shapes and sizes. At the same time the advent of the steamship forced canvas mills and sail makers to search for new markets. An awning industry developed offering an array of frame and fabric options adaptable to both storefronts and windows.

=== Late 19th century ===
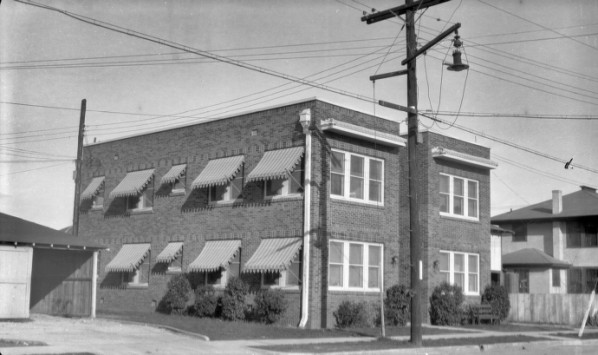
Awnings over windows

In the second half of the 19th century, manufactured operable awnings grew in popularity. Previously, most awnings had fixed frames—the primary way to retract the covering was to roll it up the rafters by hand. Operable systems for both storefront and window awnings had extension arms that were hinged where they joined the facade. The arms were lowered to project the awning or raised to retract the awning using simple rope and pulley arrangements. Because the canvas remained attached to the framework, retractable awnings allowed a more flexible approach to shading (shopkeepers and owners could incrementally adjust the amount of awning coverage depending upon the weather conditions). When the sun came out from behind clouds, the awning could be deployed with ease. In case of sudden storms, owners could quickly retract the awning against the building wall where it was protected from wind gusts.

Despite their advantages, early operable awnings had drawbacks; when retracted, their cloth coverings often bunched up against the building facade. This left part of the fabric exposed to inclement weather, and deterioration was often accelerated by moisture pooling in the folds of fabric. If poorly designed or badly placed, the retracted fabric could obscure part of the window or door opening, and even if out of the way an imperfectly folded awning presented an unkempt appearance. Modern materials and designs have eliminated all of these issues.

== Types ==
=== Actuation ===
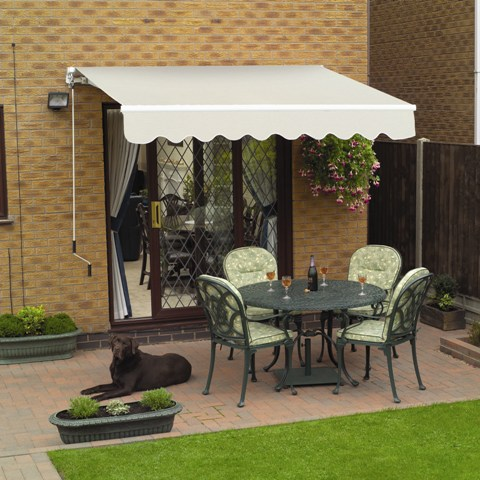
An example of a modern garden awning

Today's awnings come in two basic types: manually operated models, and motorized models (operated by electric motor). Each offers its own advantages. Benefits include low-cost affordability, easy adaptability to almost any deck or patio, and support arms that can be angled back against the house or set vertically on the deck or patio floor. These arms provide extra support and stability which some owners prefer in windy areas, and increase the awning's versatility by making the attachment of certain accessories available.

Motorized awnings have no vertical supports. Instead, they have retracting lateral arms, creating an unobstructed shaded area. These awnings are operated by an electric motor, generally hidden inside the roller bar of the awning. The arms open and close the awning at the touch of a wireless remote control or a wall-mounted switch.

Modern awnings may be constructed with covers of various types of fabrics, aluminium, corrugated fibreglass, corrugated polycarbonate or other materials. High winds can cause damage to an extended awning, and newer designs incorporate a wind sensor for automatic retraction in certain conditions.

=== Wind tolerance and construction ===
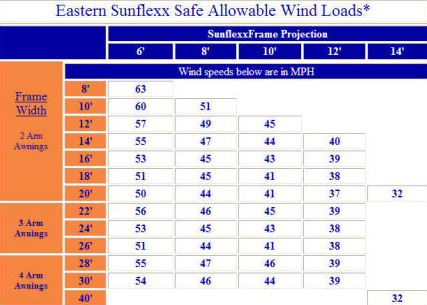
Wind tolerance

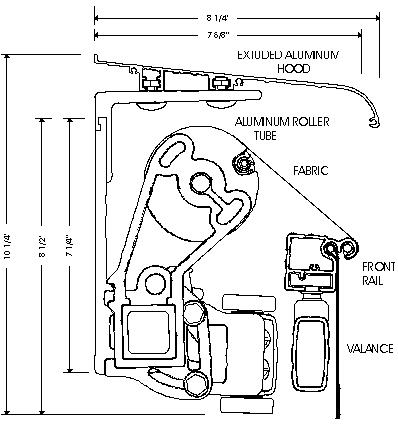
Design schematics for awning type used at the White House

Modern awnings are rated for wind tolerance based on width, length, number of supporting arms, and material. Modern awning design incorporates urethane compression joints, steel support structures, and wind sensors. Such designs are currently in use at the White House, Grand Central Station, and the Kremlin.

=== Aluminium awnings ===
Aluminium awnings have long been popular in residential applications throughout the world. They are available in many colors and are usually painted with a baked-on enamel paint. Among the many benefits of these awnings are cooler temperatures inside the home, shade for your patio, extending the life of furniture and window treatments. One beneficial feature of the awnings are the fact that they have a usable life of well over 40 years.

Some aluminum awnings are designed to be folded down and fastened to protect windows in case of storms such as hurricanes.

=== Retractable awnings ===
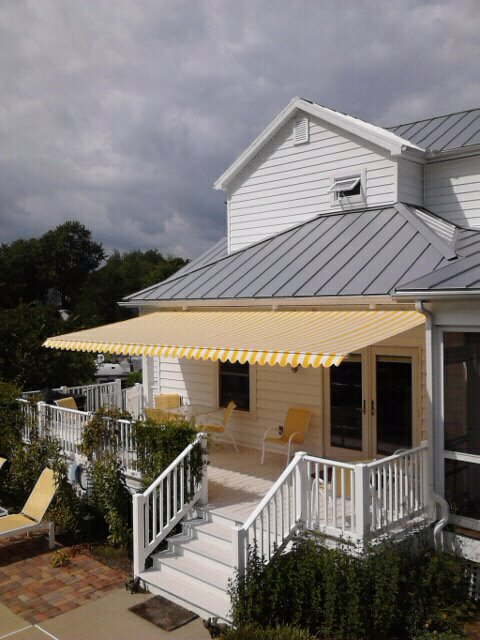
Retractable awning in Maryland, USA

Retractable awnings are now becoming very popular with homeowners in the United States. They have been popular in Europe for many years, due to higher energy costs and lack of air conditioning.

Some retractable awnings can include photovoltaic cells or rollable solar panels to generate electricity.

Retractable awnings can include the following types:

==== Retractable patio cover systems ====
Retractable patio cover systems are the latest "entry" in to the retractable market. Most of these systems are water-proof as compared to water-resistant (lateral arm awnings) and therefore allow no water penetration through the fabric "roof" section. These systems meet Beaufort scale wind loads up to Beaufort 10 (89–101 km/h or 48–55 kn or 55–63 mph) depending on model and size. Another advantage of retractable patio cover systems is that they can be enclosed on the front and sides using solar shade screens. This allows for an "outdoor room" that can be heated in the winter and air conditioned in the summer.

==== Retractable lateral arm awnings or folding arm awnings ====
These are a modern version of the old storefront crank-up awnings of the last century. The two, three or four tension arms (width dependent) and a top tube are supported by a torsion bar. With a Traditional 'Open Style' folding arm awning the torsion bar (also known as square bar) fits into wall or soffit or fascia or roof mounted brackets that spread the load to the wall or roof truss. The newer 'Full Cassette' style of folding arm awning does away with the torsion bar and uses an aluminium extrusion that interlocks with brackets that in-turn spreads the cantilevered force imposed by the awning into the structure it is fitted to. Hand-cranked awnings are still available, but motorized awnings are now most common due to advances in technology, manufacturing & reliability over the last few decades. The motor is inside the roller tube that the fabric rolls around and therefore is not visible. Many motors now have a built-in receiver and are operated by remote control, smartphone, tablet or home automation.

Lateral arm awnings are also known as folding arm, deck or patio awnings, as they can extend / project as far as 5 m (16 ft) and when several awnings are coupled together, can be as wide as 16 m (52 ft) or more – thus covering a large outdoor space. Normally a single folding arm awning can only span 7 m (23 ft) in a single system due to difficulties transporting, storing and powder coating extrusion greater than this size.

The most common fabric choice for folding arm awning is solution dyed acrylic fabric that comes in a variety of styles, colours, patterns as well as performance grades for water repellence and fire retardancy. Solution dyed acrylic fabric is the most suitable fabric for use in these awnings due to dimensional properties, ease of manufacturing, weight (versus woven mesh) & high levels of filtering of and resistance against UV.

==== Retractable side or drop arm awnings ====
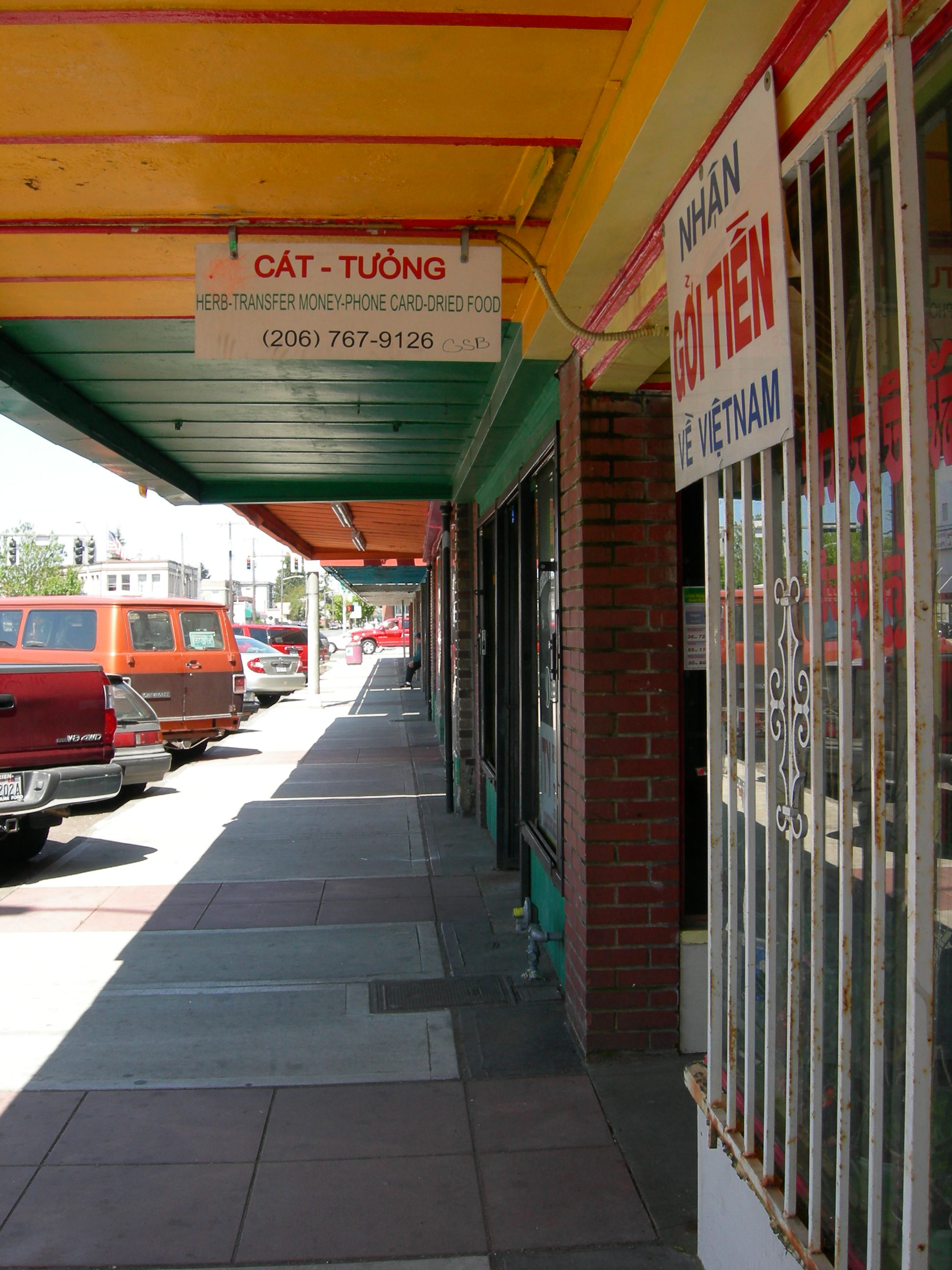
Rigid shop awnings

Commonly used to shade a window, with a roller tube at the top, spring-loaded side arms, and a motor, crank or tape-pull operator. Awnings with sides are commonly known as traditional style awnings as they have been used for many years dating back to the early 19th century using cotton canvas fabric. Canvas was replaced in the 1960s by more acrylic materials and polyester in more recent times driven by a focus on the environment. Traditional style awnings are appropriate for historical buildings and are still popular today using a more weather resistant fabric and a rope and pulley system for retracting the awnings. Awnings without sides do not provide as much sun protection as those with sides. Awnings without sides come in many different styles. Drop Arm Awnings without sides come with roller tubes at the top and are available with motors and wind sensors for automatic retraction. Spear Awnings are made without sides and are made with Wrought Iron Frames and they can be retracted with a rope and pulley system but are not available with motors.

Awnings with sides provide sun protection for east and west facing windows, while north and south facing windows can be protected with awnings without sides. Awnings provide shade to keep a house cooler, and can also be used around porches, decks, and patios.

==== Portable, pop-up canopies ====
A portable pop-up canopy or tent provides a cost-effective temporary solution to people who want to enjoy shade. The portable designs offer versatility to take the unit to social events. The frame usually incorporates an accordion-style truss which folds up compactly.

==== Retractable solar shade screens ====
Shade screens utilize acrylic canvas or a mesh fabric, which allows some view-through while blocking the sun's rays. The roller at the top may be hand-cranked or motorized. The fabric is gravity-fed, with a weighted bottom rail pulling the fabric down between guide rails or guy wires. Exterior shades are much more effective at blocking heat than interior shades, since they block the heat before it enters the glass. This style of framed screen is typically done by professional installers, because of the specialized frames and tools required. A recent advancement is frame-less shade screens, which allows a "DIY-er" to install their own exterior shades. Solar shade screens can also be installed at the end of awnings to provide horizontal shade during early morning or late afternoon sun positions.

==== Retractable solar window awnings ====
Retractable solar window awnings are made from fabric. They are resistant to hail and harsh winter weather. Many solar window awnings can be programmed to open and close automatically in response to the sun.

=== Shade sails ===
Shade sails provide semi-horizontal shading. They can be demounted with some difficulty and are usually left in place year round. Retractable versions also exist, with greater cost but also greater utility, as they can be retracted to admit winter sun if required.

=== Vehicle and camping awnings ===
Awnings designed for camping and touring are a distinct category, differing significantly in design and function from traditional residential awnings. Rather than being permanently fixed to a building, these awnings are designed for portability and temporary attachment to recreational vehicles such as campervans, motorhomes, or caravans. Their primary purpose is to extend the sheltered living space of a vehicle, providing areas for dining, storage, or sleeping while protecting occupants from the elements.

Attachment methods are unique to this category, most commonly utilising a keder strip, a flexible cord sewn into the edge of the awning fabric—which slides into a C-profile awning rail fixed to the vehicle. A popular form of attachment for side awnings and 270 awnings is to bolt directly to roof bars or roof rack via the integrated accessory rail, utilising a secure T-track and T-bolt system. Other methods include throwing securing straps over the vehicle or using magnetic strips to temporarily fix the awning to a van's roof.

=== Drive-away awnings ===
A drive-away awning is a freestanding tent structure designed to attach to a vehicle but also to be detached from it without being disassembled. This is achieved via a connecting fabric tunnel, known as a "cowl," which bridges the gap between the main body of the awning and the vehicle's side. This cowl can be easily disconnected, allowing the vehicle to be driven away for day trips, leaving the awning standing independently at the campsite to reserve the pitch and store equipment. Upon returning, the driver simply reverses the vehicle back into position, and the cowl is reattached. This functionality is a key feature that distinguishes them from simpler canopy-style awnings.

=== Inflatable (air) awnings ===
A major innovation in modern awning design is the inflatable awning (often called an "air awning"). This technology replaces traditional rigid pole structures made of fibreglass or steel with robust, inflatable tubes or "air beams." These beams are integrated into the awning's fabric and are inflated with a pump to create a rigid, stable frame. The primary advantages of inflatable technology are a significant reduction in pitching time and complexity, often allowing one person to erect a large awning in minutes.

== Classification numbers ==
Construction Specifications Institute (CSI) Division 10 MasterFormat 2004 Edition:

- 10 73 13 – Awnings
- 10 73 16 – Canopies
- 10 71 13 – Exterior Sun Control Devices
- 10 71 13.43 – Fixed Sun Screen
- 10 73 00 – Protective Covers (Generic)

CSI MasterFormat 1995 Edition:

- 10530 – Protective Covers, Awnings & Canopies
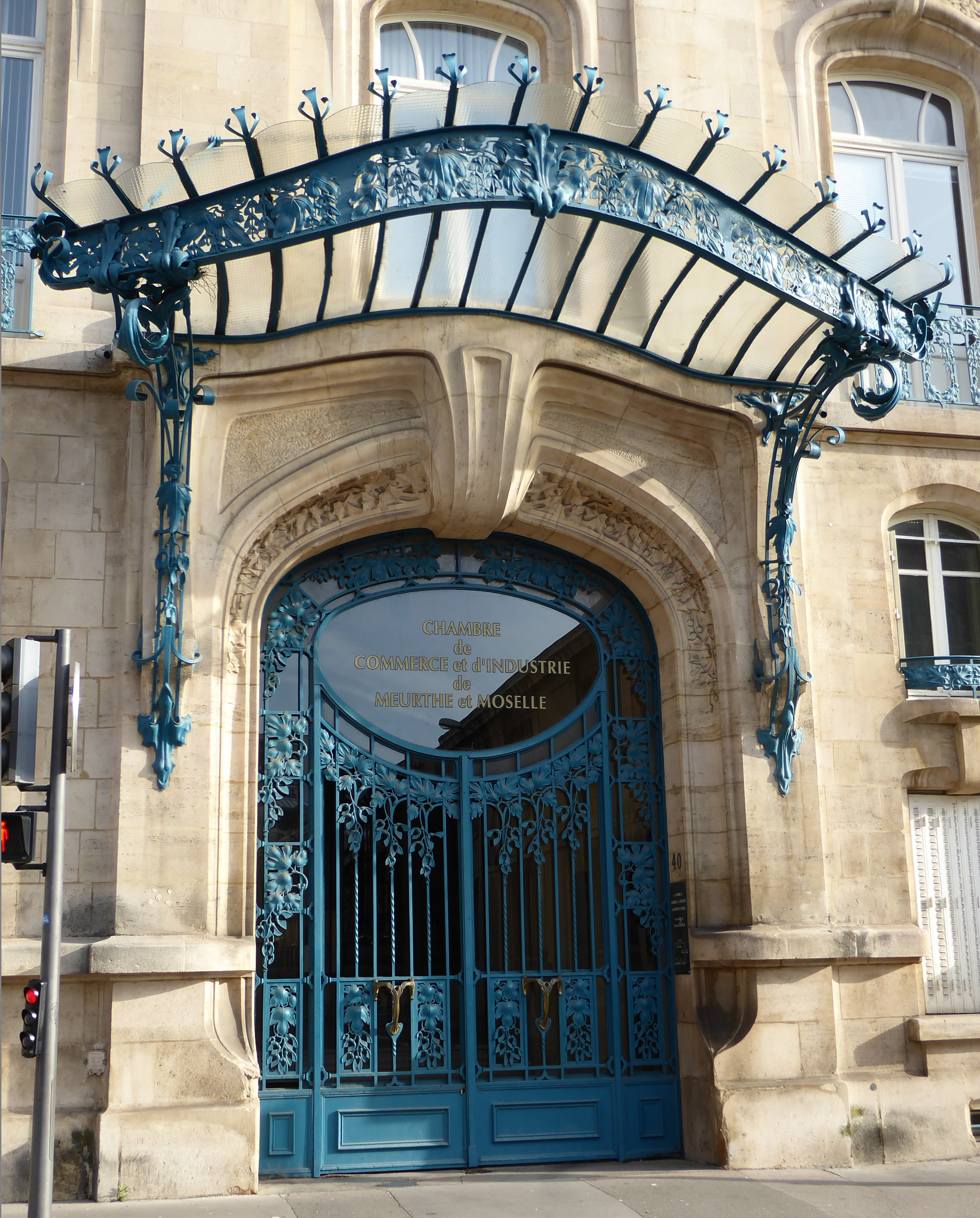
Art Nouveau 'marquise' in Nancy, France

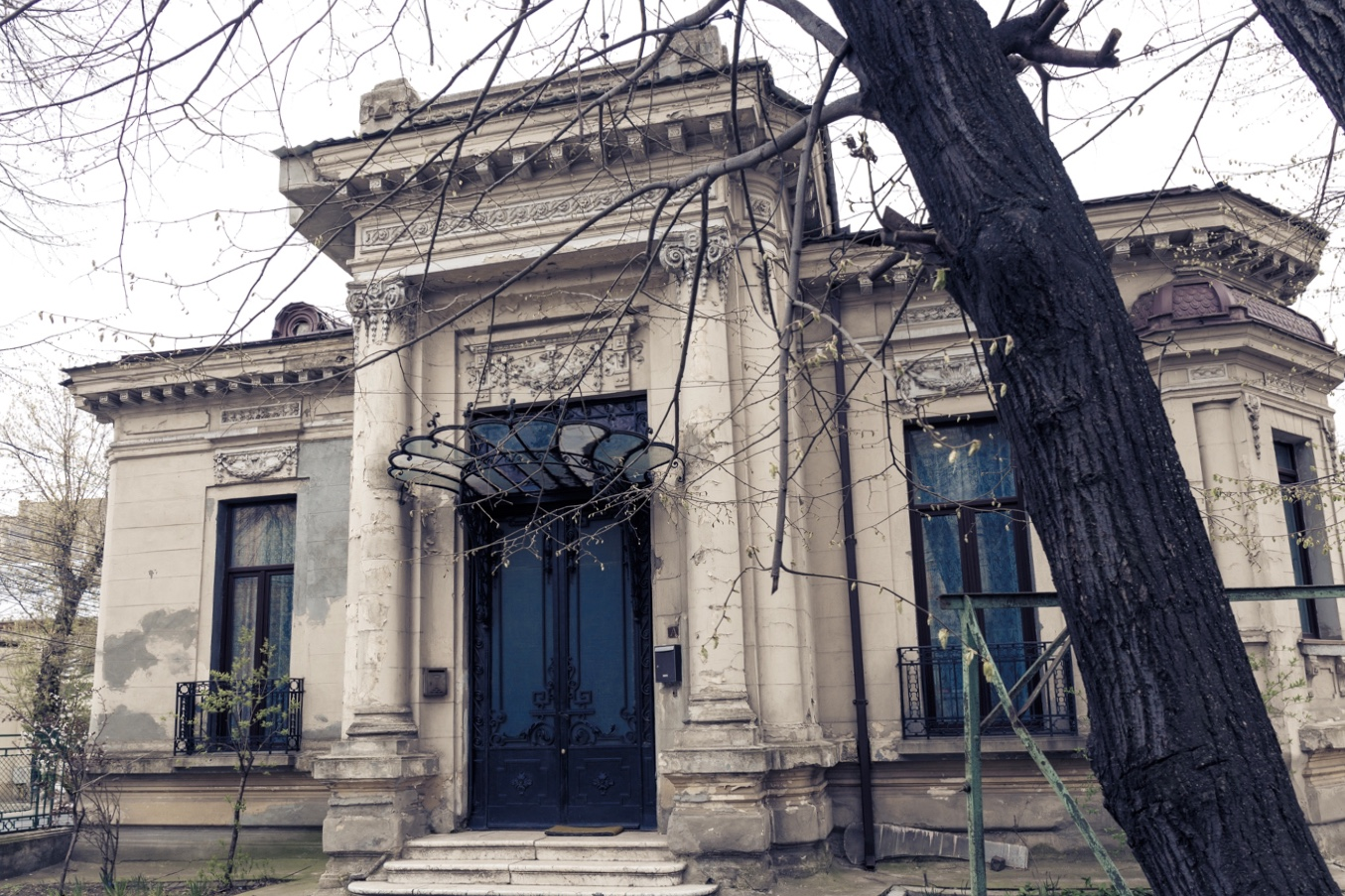
City-house with a awning above the entrance in Bucharest, Romania

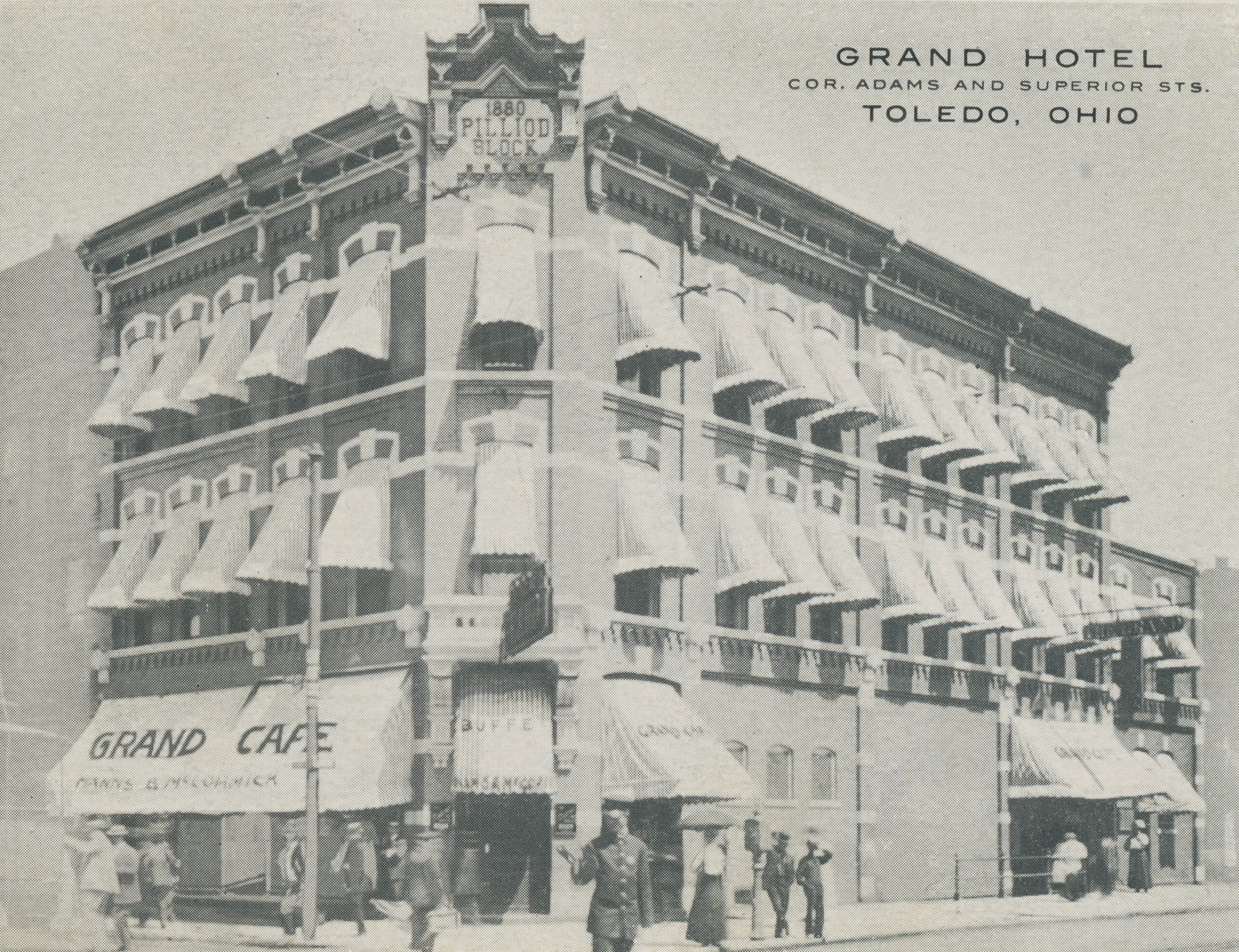
Grand Hotel with numerous awnings in Toledo, Ohio

== See also ==
- Brise soleil
- Canopy (architecture)
- Curtain
- Overhang (architecture)
- Rope
- Solar panel
- Tent
- Umbrella
- Verandah
- Window blind
