= Canopy (architecture) =

Structure providing shade or shelter

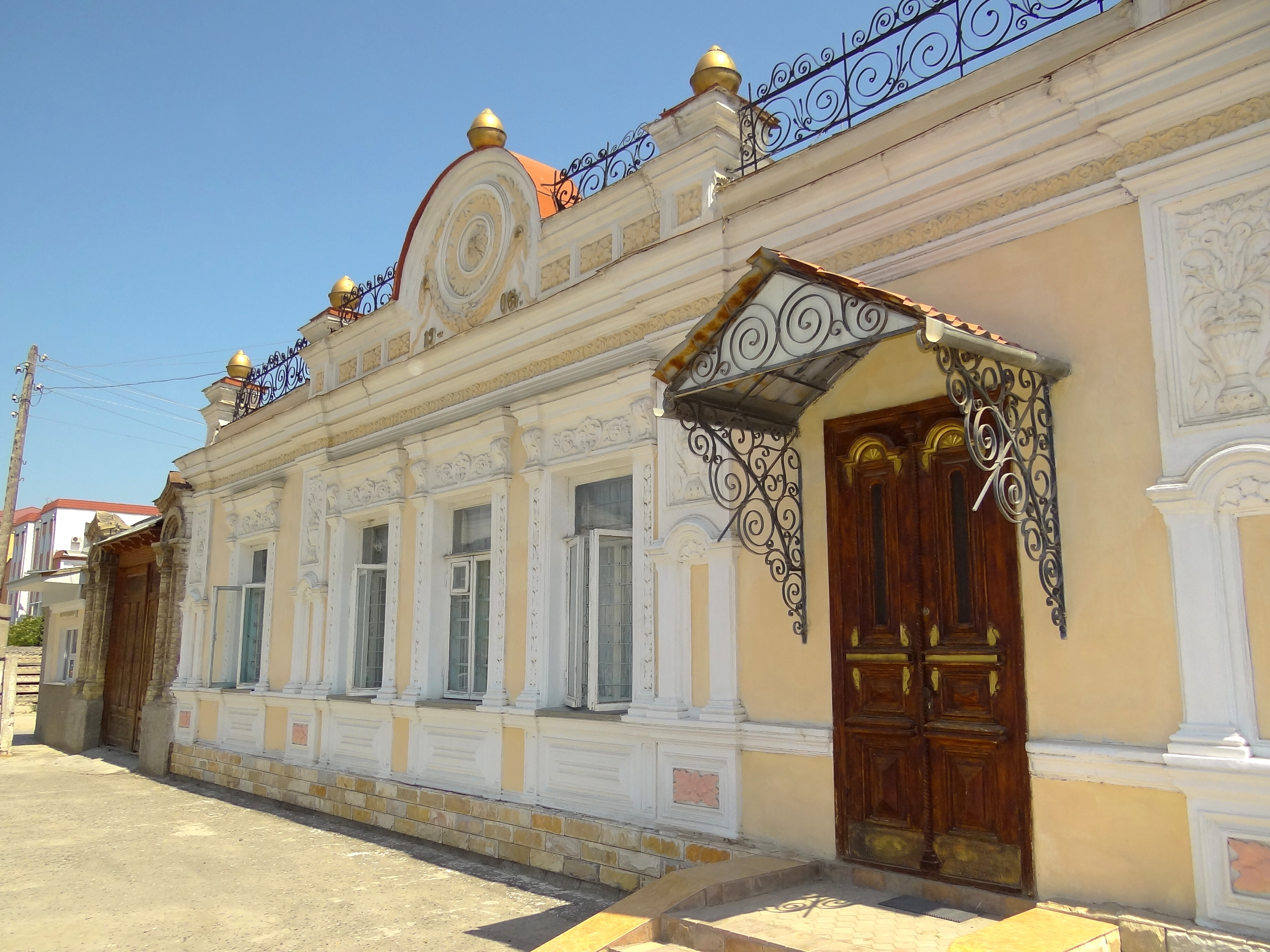
Canopy over a doorway in Fergana, Uzbekistan

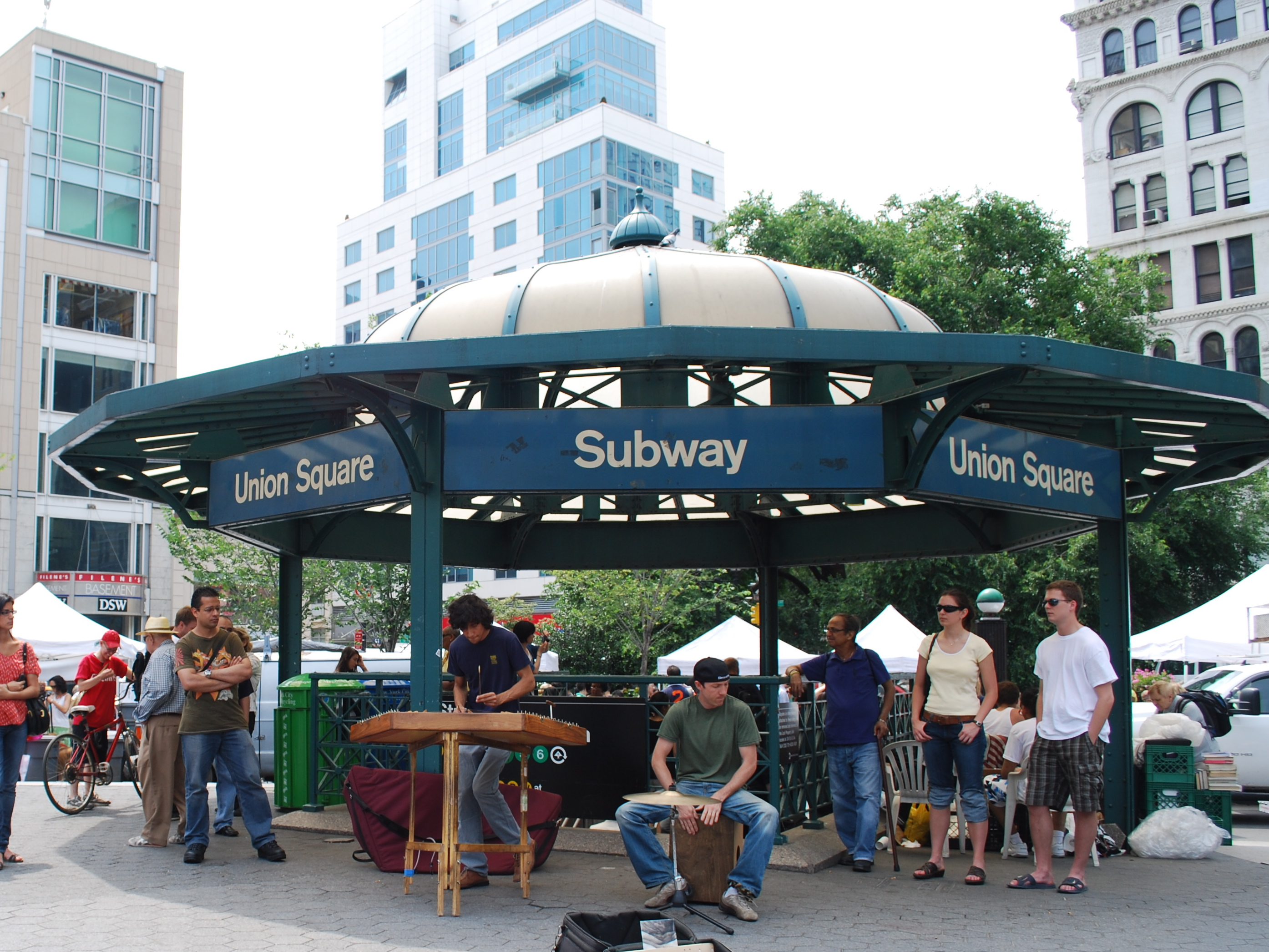
Canopied entrance to the New York City Subway at the 14th Street–Union Square station

A canopy is a type of overhead roof or else a structure over which a fabric or metal covering is attached, able to provide shade or shelter from weather conditions such as sun, hail, snow and rain. They are frequently found at bus shelters and train station platforms. A canopy can also be a tent, generally without a floor. The word comes from the ancient Greek κωνώπειον (konópeion, "cover to keep insects off"), from κώνωψ (kónops, "cone-face"), which is a bahuvrihi compound meaning "mosquito". The first 'o' changing into 'a' may be due to influence from the place name Canopus, Egypt thought of as a place of luxuries.

Architectural canopies include projections giving protection from the weather, or merely decoration. Such canopies are supported by the building to which they are attached and often also by a ground mounting provided by not less than two stanchions, or upright support posts.

Canopies can also stand alone, such as a fabric covered gazebo or cabana. Fabric canopies can meet various design needs. Many modern fabrics are long-lasting, bright, easily cleaned, strong and flame-retardant. This material can be vinyl, acrylic, polyester or canvas. Modern frame materials offer high strength-to-weight ratios and corrosion resistance. The proper combination of these properties can result in safe, strong, economical and attractive products.

== Classification numbers ==
Construction Specifications Institute (CSI) Division 10 MasterFormat 2004 Edition:

- 10 73 16 - Canopies
- 10 73 00 - Protective Covers

CSI MasterFormat 1995 Edition:

- 10530 - Canopies

== Solar canopies ==
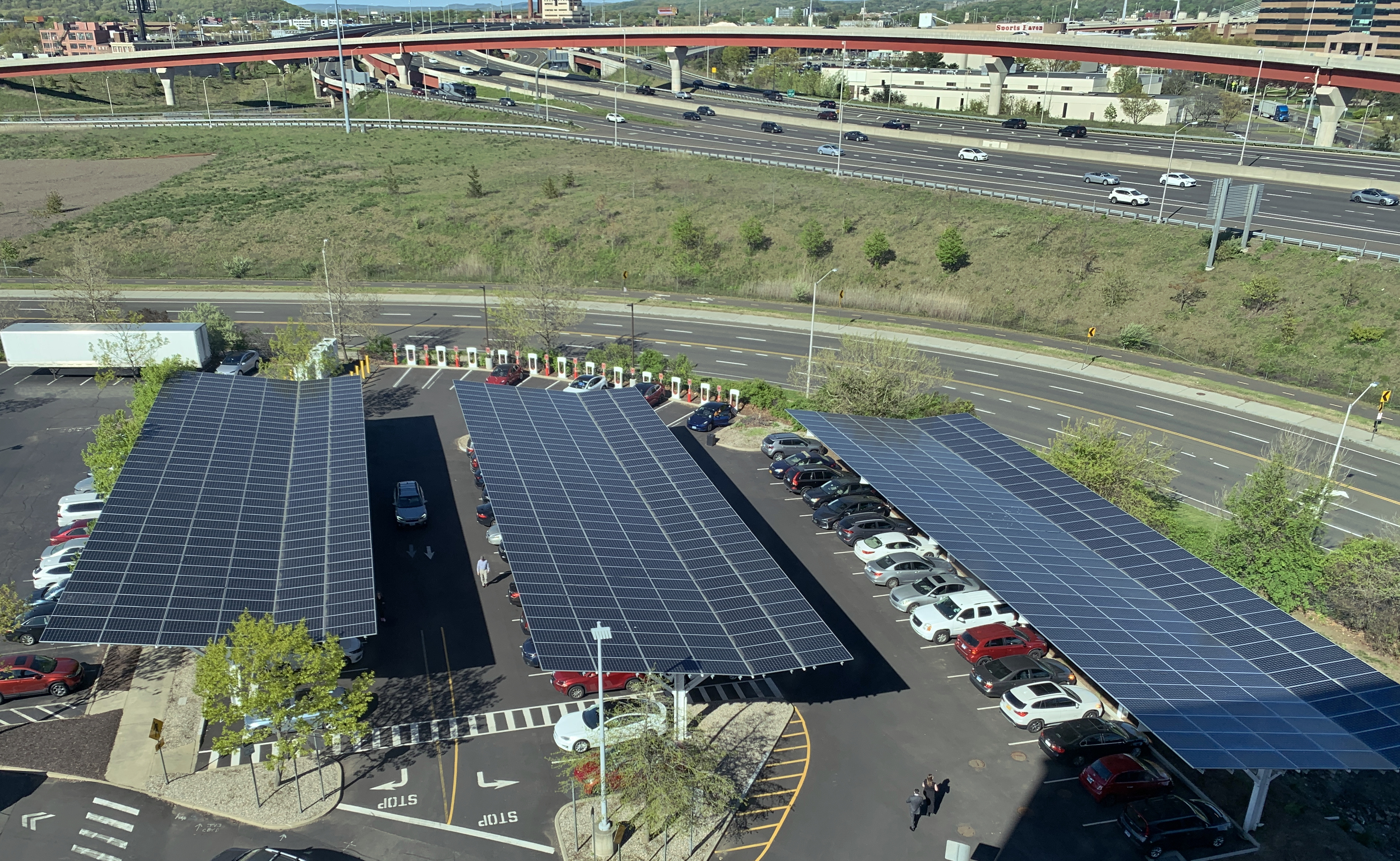
Solar canopy parking lot in New Haven at Hotel Marcel. There are EV level 2 chargers underneath the canopy and a 12-stall Tesla Supercharger behind.

Solar canopies are solar arrays installed on canopies, which could be a parking lot canopy, carport, gazebo, Pergola, or patio cover.

== See also ==
- Awning
- Caponier
- Chuppah
- Dome
- Gazebo
- Onion dome
- Pop up canopies
