= Home inspection =

Basic examination of a home's condition

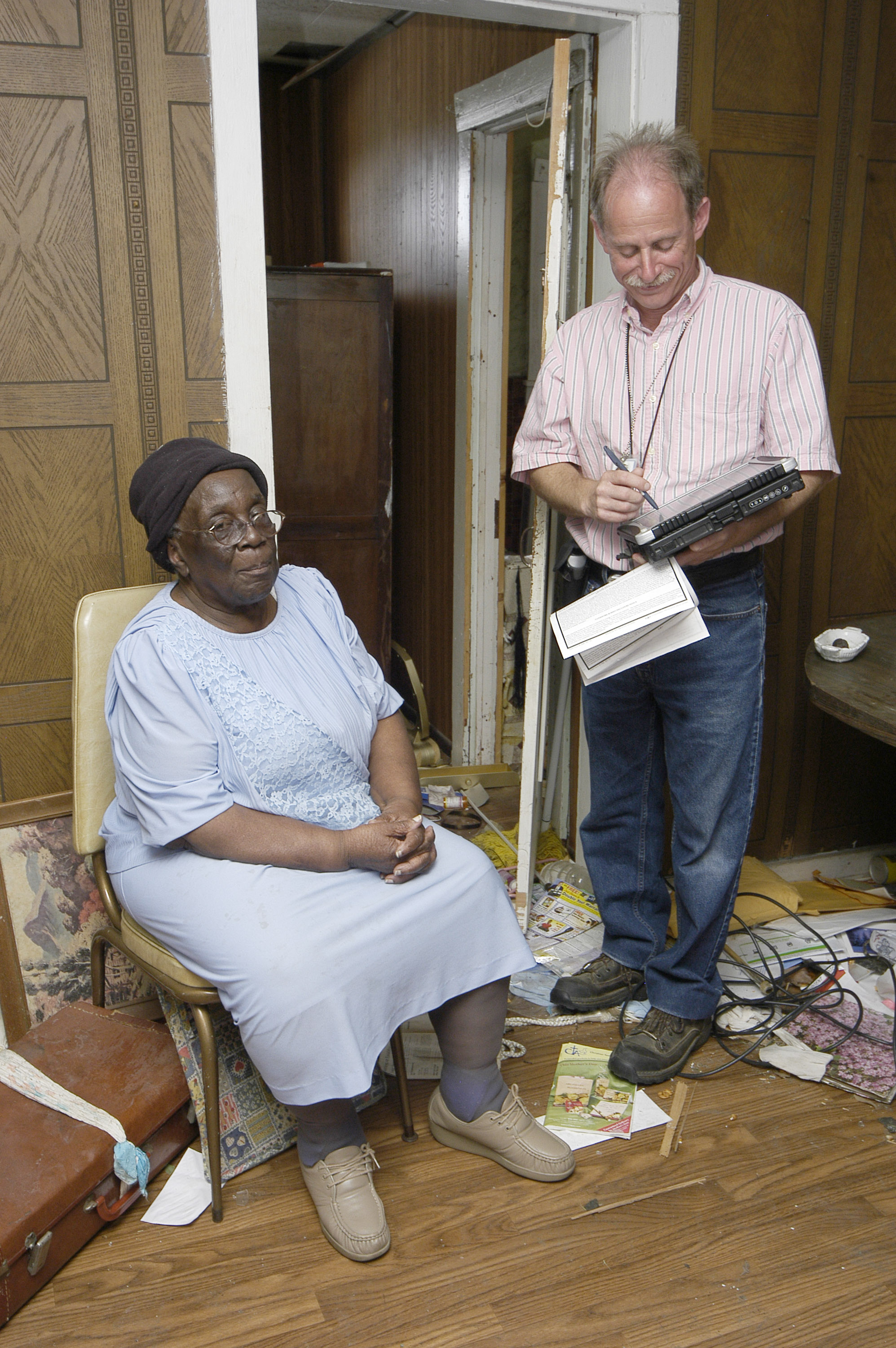
A disaster inspector at work in the United States assessing tornado damage to a house

A home inspection is a limited, non-invasive examination of the condition of a home, often in connection with the sale of that home. Home inspections are usually conducted by a home inspector who has the training and certifications to perform such inspections. The inspector prepares and delivers to the client a written report of findings. In general, home inspectors recommend that potential purchasers join them during their onsite visits to provide context for the comments in their written reports. The client then uses the knowledge gained to make informed decisions about their pending real estate purchase. The home inspector describes the condition of the home at the time of inspection but does not guarantee future condition, efficiency, or life expectancy of systems or components.

Sometimes confused with a real estate appraiser, a home inspector determines the condition of a structure, whereas an appraiser determines the value of a property. In the United States, although not all states or municipalities regulate home inspectors, there are various professional associations for home inspectors that provide education, training, and networking opportunities. A professional home inspection is an examination of the current condition of a house. It is not an inspection to verify compliance with appropriate codes; building inspection is a term often used for building code compliance inspections in the United States. A similar but more complicated inspection of commercial buildings is a property condition assessment. Home inspections identify problems but building diagnostics identifies solutions to the found problems and their predicted outcomes. A property inspection is a detailed visual documentation of a property's structures, design, and fixtures. Property inspection provides a buyer, renter, or other information consumer with valuable insight into the property's conditions prior to purchase.

== North America ==
In Canada and the United States, a contract to purchase a house may include a contingency that the contract is not valid until the buyer, through a home inspector or other agents, has had an opportunity to verify the condition of the property. In many states and provinces, home inspectors are required to be licensed, but in some states, the profession is not regulated. Typical requirements for obtaining a license are the completion of an approved training course and/or a successful examination by the state's licensing board. Several states and provinces also require inspectors to periodically obtain continuing education credits in order to renew their licenses. Unless specifically advertised as part of the home inspection, items often needed to satisfy mortgage or tile requirements such as termite ("pest") inspections must be obtained separately from licensed and regulated companies.

In May 2001, Massachusetts became the first state to recognize the potential conflict of interest when real estate agents selling a home also refer or recommend the home inspector to the potential buyer. As a result, the real estate licensing law in Massachusetts was amended to prohibit listing real estate agents from directly referring home inspectors. The law also prohibits listing agents from giving out a "short" name list of inspectors. The only list that can be given out is the complete list of all licensed home inspectors in the state.

In September 2018, the California state legislature passed Senate Bill 721 (SB 721), which requires buildings with specific conditions, such as having exterior elevated structures, to undergo inspections by licensed professionals. These inspections must be conducted by qualified individuals, such as structural engineering firms, and a detailed report must be issued. Failure to comply with these requirements can result in penalties for property owners.

Ancillary services such as inspections for wood destroying insects, radon testing, septic tank inspections, water quality, mold, (or excessive moisture which may lead to mold), and private well inspections are sometimes part of home inspector's services if duly qualified.

In many provinces and states, home inspection standards are developed and enforced by professional associations, such as, worldwide, the International Association of Certified Home Inspectors (InterNACHI); in the United States, the American Society of Home Inspectors (ASHI), and the National Association of Home Inspectors (NAHI)(No Longer active 10/2017); and, in Canada, the Canadian Association of Home and Property Inspectors (CAHPI), the Professional Home & Property Inspectors of Canada (PHPIC) and the National Home Inspector Certification Council (NHICC).

Currently, more than thirty U.S. states regulate the home inspection industry in some form.

Canada saw a deviation from this model when in 2016 an association-independent home inspection standard was completed. This was developed in partnership with industry professionals, consumer advocates, and technical experts, by the Canadian Standards Association. The CAN/CSA A770-16 Home Inspection Standard was funded by three provincial governments with the intent to be the unifying standard for home inspections carried out within Canada. It is the only home inspection standard that has been endorsed by the Standards Council of Canada.

In Canada, there are provincial associations which focus on provincial differences that affect their members and consumers. Ontario has the largest population of home inspectors which was estimated in 2013 as part of a government survey at being around 1500.

To date, Ontario Association of Certified Home Inspectors is the only association which has mandated that its members migrate to the CAN/CSA A770-16 Home Inspection Standard, with a date of migration set as February 28, 2020. Other national and provincial associations have set it as an option to be added to other supported standards.

In Canada, only Alberta and British Columbia have implemented government regulation for the home inspection profession. The province of Ontario has proceeded through the process, with the passage of regulatory procedure culminating in the Home Inspection Act, 2017 to license Home Inspectors in that province. It has received royal assent but is still awaiting the development of regulations and proclamation to become law.

In Ontario, there are two provincial Associations, OAHI (the Ontario Association of Home Inspectors) and OntarioACHI (the Ontario Association of Certified Home Inspectors). Both claim to be the largest association in the province. OAHI, formed by a private member's Bill in the Provincial Assembly, has the right in law to award the R.H.I. (Registered Home Inspector) designation to anyone on its membership register. The R.H.I. designation, however, is a reserved designation, overseen by OAHI under the Ontario Association of Home Inspectors Act, 1994. This Act allows OAHI to award members who have passed and maintained strict criteria set out in their membership bylaws and who operate within Ontario. Similarly, OntarioACHI requires equally high standards for the award of their certification, the Canadian-Certified Home Inspector (CCHI) designation. To confuse things, Canadian Association of Home and Property Inspectors (CAHPI) own the copyright to the terms Registered Home Inspector and RHI. Outside of Ontario, OAHI Members cannot use the terms without being qualified by CAHPI.

The proclamation of the Home Inspection Act, 2017, requires the dissolution of the Ontario Association of Home Inspectors Act, 1994, which will remove the right to title in Ontario of the RHI at the same time removing consumer confusion about the criteria for its award across Canada.

== United Kingdom ==
A home inspector in the United Kingdom (or more precisely in England and Wales), was an inspector certified to carry out the Home Condition Reports that it was originally anticipated would be included in the Home Information Pack.

Home inspectors were required to complete the ABBE Diploma in Home Inspection to show they met the standards set out for NVQ/VRQ competency-based assessment (Level 4). The government had suggested that between 7,500 and 8,000 qualified and licensed home inspectors would be needed to meet the annual demand of nearly 2,000,000 Home Information Packs. In the event, many more than this entered training, resulting in a massive oversupply of potential inspectors.

With the cancellation of Home Information Packs by the coalition Government in 2010, the role of the home inspector in the United Kingdom became permanently redundant.

Inspections of the home, as part of a real estate transaction, are still generally carried out in the UK in the same manner as they had been for years before the Home Condition Report process. Home Inspections are more detailed than those currently offered in North America. They are generally performed by a chartered member of the Royal Institution of Chartered Surveyors.

== India ==
The concept of home inspection in India is in its infancy. There has been a proliferation of companies that have started offering the service, predominantly in Tier-1 cities such as Bangalore, Chennai, Kolkata, Pune, Mumbai, etc. To help bring about a broader understanding among the general public and market the concept, a few home inspection companies have come together and formed the Home Inspection Association of India.

After RERA came into effect, the efficacy and potency of home inspection companies has increased tremendously. The majority of homeowners and potential home buyers do not know what home inspection is or that such a service exists.

The way that home inspection is different in India than in North America or United Kingdom is the lack of a government authorised licensing authority. Apart from the fact that houses in India are predominantly built with kiln baked bricks, concrete blocks or even just concrete walls (predominantly in high rise apartments) this means the tests conducted are vastly different. Most home inspection companies conduct non-destructive testing of the property, in some cases based on customer requirement, tests that require core-cutting are also performed. Companies such as HomeCheck.in have emerged as professional service providers in Hyderabad and other Indian cities, leveraging modern diagnostic tools for comprehensive property inspections.

The majority of homeowners are not aware of the concept of home inspection in India. The other issue is that the balance of power is highly tilted toward the builder; this means the home buyers are stepping on their proverbial toes, because in most cases, the home is the single most expensive purchase in their lifetime, and the homeowners do not want to come across as antagonising the builders.

== Home inspection standards and exclusions ==
Some home inspectors and home inspection regulatory bodies maintain various standards related to the trade. Some inspection companies offer 90-day limited warranties to protect clients from unexpected mechanical and structural failures; otherwise, inspectors are not responsible for future failures. (Note: A general list of exclusions include but are not limited to: code or zoning violations, permit research, property measurements or surveys, boundaries, easements or right of way, conditions of title, proximity to environmental hazards, noise interference, soil or geological conditions, well water systems or water quality, underground sewer lines, waste disposal systems, buried piping, cisterns, underground water tanks and sprinkler systems. A complete list of standards and procedures for home inspections can be found at NAHI, ASHI, InterNACHI, or IHINA websites.) A general inspection standard for buildings other than residential homes can be found at the National Academy of Building Inspection Engineers.

Many inspectors may also offer ancillary services such as inspecting pools, sprinkler systems, checking radon levels, and inspecting for wood-destroying organisms. The CAN/CSA-A770-16 standard allows this (in-fact it demands swimming pool safety inspections as a requirement) and also mandates that the inspector be properly qualified to offer these. Other standards are silent on this.

== Types of inspections ==
=== Home buyers and home sellers inspections ===
Home inspections are often used by prospective purchasers of the house in question, in order to evaluate the condition of the house prior to the purchase. Similarly, a home seller can elect to have an inspection on their property and report the results of that inspection to the prospective buyer.

=== Foreclosure inspection ===
Recently foreclosed properties may require home inspections.

=== Four point inspection ===
An inspection of the house's roof, HVAC, and electrical and plumbing systems is often known as a "four-point inspection", which insurance companies may require as a condition for homeowner's insurance.

=== Disaster inspection ===
Home inspections may occur after a disaster has struck the house. A disaster examination, unlike a standard house inspection, concentrates on damage rather than the quality of everything visible and accessible from the roof to the basement.

Inspectors go to people's homes or work places who have asked for FEMA disaster aid.

=== Section 8 inspection ===
In the United States, the federal and state governments provide housing subsidies to low-income people through the Section 8 program. The government expects that the housing will be "fit for habitation" so a Section 8 inspection identifies compliance with HUD's Housing Quality Standards (HQS).

=== Pre-delivery inspection ===
An inspection may occur in a purchased house prior to the deal's closure, in what is known as a "pre-delivery" inspection.

=== Structural inspection ===
The house's structure may also be inspected. When performing a structural inspection, the inspector will look for a variety of distress indications that may result in repair or further evaluation recommendations.

In the state of New York, only a licensed professional engineer or a registered architect can render professional opinions as to the sufficiency structural elements of a home or building. Municipal building officials can also make this determination, but they are not performing home inspections at the time they are rendering this opinion. Municipal officials are also not required to look out for the best interest of the buyer. Some other states may have similar provisions in their licensing laws. Someone who is not a licensed professional engineer or a registered architect can describe the condition of structural elements (cracked framing, sagged beams/roof, severe rot or insect damage, etc.), but are not permitted to render a professional opinion as to how the condition has affected the structural soundness of the building.

Various systems of the house, including plumbing and HVAC, may also be inspected.

=== Thermal imaging Inspection ===
A thermal imaging inspection using an infrared camera can provide inspectors with information on home energy loss, heat gain/loss through the exterior walls and roof, moisture leaks, and improper electrical system conditions that are typically not visible to the naked eye. Thermal imaging is not considered part of a General Home Inspection because it exceeds the scope of inspection Standards of Practice.

=== Pool and spa inspection ===
Inspection of swimming pools and spas is not considered part of a General Home Inspection because their inspection exceeds the scope of inspection Standards of Practice. However, some home inspectors are also certified to inspect pools and spas and offer this as an ancillary service.

=== Tree health inspection ===
Inspection of trees on the property is not considered part of a General Home Inspection because their inspection exceeds the scope of inspection Standards of Practice. This type of inspection is typically performed by a Certified Arborist and assesses the safety and condition of the trees on a property before the sales agreement is executed.

=== Property inspection report for immigration ===
The UKVI (United Kingdom Visa and Immigration) issued guidance on the necessity of ensuring that properties must meet guidelines so that visa applicants can be housed in properties which meet environmental and health standards. Part X of the Housing Act 1985 provides the legislative grounding for the reports - primarily to ensure that a property is not currently overcrowded, that the inclusion of further individuals as a result of successful visa applications - whether spouse visa, dependent visa, indefinite leave to remain or visitor visa, can house the applicants without the property becoming overcrowded. Reports are typically prepared by environmental assessors or qualified solicitors in accordance with HHSRS (Housing Health and Safety Rating Scheme). Property inspection reports are typically standard and breakdown the legal requirements.

=== Pre-Listing Home Inspection ===
A pre-listing inspection focuses on all major systems and components of the house including HVAC, electrical, plumbing, siding, doors, windows, roof and structure. It's a full home inspection for the seller to better understand the condition of their home prior to the buyer's own inspection.

== See also ==
- List of real estate topics
- Real estate appraisal
