= Ontario Association of Certified Home Inspectors =

The Ontario Association of Certified Home Inspectors is a not-for-profit corporation established by letters patent on March 12, 2012. It was created to provide province-specific support for Home Inspectors and consumers of their services.

The Association is a self-regulating volunteer-run, NPO the provides both paid and unpaid memberships.

It awards members, who have proven to have achieved and maintained a high standard of education and skills, the Canadian-Certified Home Inspector.

The association has also been stakeholders in a number of regulatory developments including:

- working with Transport Canada on Regulation of UAVs in Canada,
- engaging with CSA Group in the development of the CSA A770-16 Home Inspection Standard,
- worked with the Workplace Safety & Insurance Board on the problem around the mandatory registration of construction workers which captured Home Inspectors. After 3-years of negotiations, in 2018 the home Inspection Profession in Ontario was moved from WSIB rate class G to rate class I removing the mandatory registration process.
- Stakeholders in the J. Douglas Cunningham review of the Ontario New Home Warranties Plan Act.
- Working with Tarion on development of a training and qualification program for Home Inspectors to provide consultative services to consumers going through the new home purchasing and ownership process.

In 2018 a decision was made to adopt the newly released CSA A770-16 Home Inspection Standard as the only standard to be used by members for performing residential Home Inspections in Ontario. This decision was announced to members of the Association in 2019, with a deadline for compliance of February 28, 2020.

With five classes of membership, and a register of over 1050 members of all types, of all the Inspector associations in Canada, OntarioACHI represents the majority of the Home Inspection profession in Ontario.
