= Facility condition index =

The facility condition index (FCI) is used in facilities management to provide a benchmark to compare the relative condition of a group of facilities. The FCI is primarily used to support asset management initiatives of federal, state, and local government facilities organizations. This would also include universities, housing and transportation authorities, and primary and secondary school systems.

Mathematically the FCI is represented as

      Maintenance, Repair, and Replacement Deficiencies of the Facility(-ies)
FCI = -----------------------------------------------------------------------
          Current Replacement Value of the Facility(-ies)

The FCI as a tool was first published in 1991 by the National Association of College and University Business Officers (NACUBO).

== History ==
Applied Management Engineering (AME) was approached by a research group working on a project that was sponsored by NACUBO. The group asked for a written description of the facility condition assessment process, and related data analysis. The resulting written process and analysis served as the basis for the book.

Two of the AME employees that contributed were William H. (Bill) Thomas and the late Emmett Richardson. Both had previously worked for the Naval Facilities Engineering Command (NAVFAC), which is the U.S. Navy's facilities engineering Systems Command. Thomas and Richardson had calculated the FCI for budget preparation and used the ratio to allocate operations and maintenance money across naval activities and installations. The FCI was a strictly informal tool that Thomas and Richardson used while working for the Navy. It was developed and adopted as an industry benchmark by AME.

== Application ==
To calculate an FCI, a facility manager or third party assessment professional needs to quantify the cost of maintenance, repair and replacement deficiencies. This is typically the outcome of a facility condition assessment. The current replacement value is defined as what monetary value the organization places on the facility. An accurate FCI is dependent on the cost estimates developed for the facility deficiencies and current replacement value.

The FCI is a relative indicator of condition, and should be tracked over time to maximize its benefit. It is advantageous to define condition ratings based on ranges of the FCI. Managing the Facilities Portfolio provided a set of ratings: good (under 0.05), fair (0.05 to 0.10), and poor (over 0.10) based on evaluating data from various clients at the time of the publication.

Today, many organizations are determining an appropriate FCI range for these ratings based upon their mission and strategic goals. The Higher Education Facilities Officers, APPA, use the FCI as part of their Strategic Assessment Model, and as a key Facilities Performance Indicator. Recommendation #6 in the National Research Council publication entitled "Stewardship of Federal Facilities states that performance indicators should be used to evaulate the effectiveness of facilities maintenance and repair programs. The American Public Works Association publication, Special Report #62, describes the use and value of facility condition rating systems in Chapter 3.6.

Within the US Federal Government, the "condition index" (CI) is a general measure of the constructed asset's condition at a specific point in time. Within the US Federal Government, CI is calculated using the same formula of the ratio of Repair Needs to Plant Replacement Value (PRV) but results are presented as a percentage where higher values mean better conditions. "Repair Needs" is the amount necessary to ensure that a constructed asset (i.e. building or structure) is restored to a condition substantially equivalent to the originally intended and designed capacity, efficiency, or capability. "Plant Replacement Value" (or "Functional Replacement Value") is the cost of replacing an existing building or structure at today's standards.

The FCI can be used in the development and usage of Building Information Modeling for existing buildings. It is anticipated that future BIM will adhere to the format set forth by the Construction Specifications Institute.

== See also ==
- Performance metric
- Building information modeling
- Computerized maintenance management system
- Construction Specifications Institute
