= WDI =

WDI may refer to:

- Walt Disney Imagineering
- Web data integration
- Windows Diagnostic Infrastructure, a component of Microsoft Windows
- Wood Destroying Insect
- World Development Indicators, a World Bank database
- Workforce Development Institute
- Women's Declaration International
