= Facility condition assessment =

A facility condition assessment or building condition survey is an analysis of the condition of a building or facility in terms of its age, design, construction methods, materials and maintenance. The professionals who perform an assessment are typically architects, engineers, and skilled-trade technicians. Engineering and architectural professional opinions as to the conditions observed are part of the assessment. Building diagnostics go beyond facility condition assessments to determine solutions to the problems found and predict outcomes of the solutions.

This analysis can be done by walk-through inspection, mathematical modeling, or a combination of the two. The most accurate way of determining the condition requires walk-through to collect data. It is usually a non-intrusive procedure.

This analysis can be performed on government/public, commercial, and private facilities.

The term facility condition assessment describes work accomplished for federal, state, and local government agencies or entities, as well as private facilities.

== History ==
Architectural and engineering (A&E) firms, or organizations, assess facilities as a part of their range of duties, although engineering and architectural work are not part of the assessment and are excluded in the scope of the assessment. The end product was usually an extensive narrative, supplemented with drawings and photographs, as to what conditions were observed, with a summary budget for correction of all deficiencies.

In the 1970s the term "facility audit" was commonly used. This term was phased out as it suggested a review of the way a facility manager spent money on the facility; something that might be done by an "auditor". Modern-day work took on its current form around the time of the founding of the International Facility Management Association in 1980, although the two were not related.

Facility condition assessments became useful because of the dramatic reduction in the size of computers, coupled with a rapid increase in speed and storage. This helped create the product known as a computerized maintenance management system.

The first publication that described the use of facility condition assessment data, financial modeling, and the use of the computerized maintenance management system application was "Managing the Facilities Portfolio", published by the National Association of College University Business Officers. The principal author of that book was Applied Management Engineering of Virginia Beach, Virginia.

As technology has advanced, facility condition assessment modeling has become more recognized in the condition assessment industry. In 2007, Graphic Systems, following research they had performed for the United States federal government, published a white paper on Condition Indices and Strategic Planning, demonstrating the value that strategic condition assessment modeling and the theoretical condition index can offer to traditional visual condition assessment programs.

== Application ==
Once the walk-through data has been collected, appropriate estimates to correct the deficiencies should be prepared. When this is done, the user is left with potentially thousands of line items that need to be sorted, grouped together, and presented in a useful format. It is typical this format will adhere to the guidelines set forth by the Construction Specifications Institute.

At this point, computerized assistance makes the product usable and changes the nature of the facility condition assessment from pure engineering and management, to an amalgam of engineering, management, and technology. Many firms use purpose-built software to make the process of data collection and reporting more efficient, improve data analysis and visualization, and allow users to develop projects and capital planning strategies based on the deficiencies and costs identified in the assessment. These software products typically integrate easily with computerized maintenance management systems, geographic information systems, and other management information systems.

Mostly facility-intensive organization such as military bases, schools, colleges and universities, and city and state governments need to develop a budget that allocates money for maintenance and repair. The information from facility condition assessments is used by people or organizations (e.g., boards of directors, commissioners, trustees, etc.) that must make these decisions as to how to distribute financial resources for facilities along with other needs of the organization. Frequently these people or organizations rely upon facility or building metrics for year-to-year comparisons.

A good example of a facility metric that can be generated by the facility condition assessment is the facility condition index. There are many facility condition assessment software systems developed by organisations to help business owners get everything at one place. The facility condition index can be further used in the development and usage of Building Information Modeling for existing buildings. The United States National Park Service used it and other metrics to better manage its assets and set realistic goals.

== See also ==
- Metrics
- Building Information Modeling
- computerized maintenance management system
- Construction Specifications Institute
