= Specification (technical standard) =

Documented requirements to be satisfied by a material, design, product, or service

A specification, colloquially spec, often refers to a set of documented requirements to be satisfied by a material, design, product, or service. A specification is often a type of technical standard.

There are different types of technical or engineering specifications (specs), and the term is used differently in different technical contexts. They often refer to particular documents, and/or particular information within them. The word specification is broadly defined as "to state explicitly or in detail" or "to be specific".

A requirement specification is a documented requirement, or set of documented requirements, to be satisfied by a given material, design, product, service, etc. It is a common early part of engineering design and product development processes in many fields.

A functional specification is a kind of requirement specification, and may show functional block diagrams.

A design or product specification describes the features of the solutions for the Requirement Specification, referring to either a designed solution or final produced solution. It is often used to guide fabrication/production. Sometimes the term specification is here used in connection with a data sheet (or spec sheet), which may be confusing. A data sheet describes the technical characteristics of an item or product, often published by a manufacturer to help people choose or use the products. A data sheet is not a technical specification in the sense of informing how to produce.

An "in-service" or "maintained as" specification, specifies the conditions of a system or object after years of operation, including the effects of wear and maintenance (configuration changes).

Specifications are a type of technical standard that may be developed by any of various kinds of organizations, in both the public and private sectors. Example organization types include a corporation, a consortium (a small group of corporations), a trade association (an industry-wide group of corporations), a national government (including its different public entities, regulatory agencies, and national laboratories and institutes), a professional association (society), a purpose-made standards organization such as ISO, or vendor-neutral developed generic requirements. It is common for one organization to refer to (reference, call out, cite) the standards of another. Voluntary standards may become mandatory if adopted by a government or business contract.

== Use ==
In engineering, manufacturing, and business, it is vital for suppliers, purchasers, and users of materials, products, or services to understand and agree upon all requirements.

A specification may refer to a standard which is often referenced by a contract or procurement document, or an otherwise agreed upon set of requirements (though still often used in the singular). In any case, it provides the necessary details about the specific requirements.

Standards for specifications may be provided by government agencies, standards organizations (SAE, AWS, NIST, ASTM, ISO / IEC, CEN / CENELEC, DoD, etc.), trade associations, corporations, and others. A memorandum published by William J. Perry, U.S. Defense Secretary, on 29 June 1994 announced that a move to "greater use of performance and commercial specifications and standards" was to be introduced, which Perry saw as "one of the most important actions that [the Department of Defense] should take" at that time. The following British standards apply to specifications:

- BS 7373-1:2001 Guide to the preparation of specifications
- BS 7373-2:2001 Product specifications. Guide to identifying criteria for a product specification and to declaring product conformity
- BS 7373-3:2005, Product specifications. Guide to identifying criteria for specifying a service offering

A design/product specification does not necessarily prove a product to be correct or useful in every context. An item might be verified to comply with a specification or stamped with a specification number: this does not, by itself, indicate that the item is fit for other, non-validated uses. The people who use the item (engineers, trade unions, etc.) or specify the item (building codes, government, industry, etc.) have the responsibility to consider the choice of available specifications, specify the correct one, enforce compliance, and use the item correctly. Validation of suitability is necessary.

Public sector procurement rules in the European Union and United Kingdom require non-discriminatory technical specifications to be used to identify the purchasing organisation's requirements. The rules relating to public works contracts initially prohibited "technical specifications having a discriminatory effect" from 1971; this principle was extended to public supply contracts by the then European Communities' Directive 77/62/EEC coordinating procedures for the award of public supply contracts, adopted in 1976. Some organisations provide guidance on specification-writing for their staff and partners. In addition to identifying the specific attributes required of the goods or services being purchased, specifications in the public sector may also make reference to the organisation's current corporate objectives or priorities.

== Guidance and content ==
Sometimes a guide or a standard operating procedure is available to help write and format a good specification. A specification might include:

- Descriptive title, number, identifier, etc. of the specification
- Date of last effective revision and revision designation
- A logo or trademark to indicate the document copyright, ownership and origin
- Table of Contents (TOC), if the document is long
- Person, office, or agency responsible for questions on the specification, updates, and deviations.
- The philosophical significance, scope or importance of the specification and its intended use.
- Terminology, definitions and abbreviations to clarify the meanings of the specification
- Test methods for measuring all specified characteristics
- Material requirements: physical, mechanical, electrical, chemical, etc. Targets and tolerances.
- Acceptance testing, including performance testing requirements. Targets and tolerances.
- Drawings, photographs, or technical illustrations
- Workmanship
- Certifications required.
- Safety considerations and requirements
- Security considerations and requirements (where appropriate: e.g. for products and services to be provided to government or military agencies, information technology firms, etc.)
- Environmental considerations and requirements
- Quality control requirements, acceptance sampling, inspections, acceptance criteria; or, where a quality management system is operating, quality assurance requirements set forth to regulate business processes involved in the delivery of the product/service which is in the scope of the specification.
- Person, office, or agency responsible for enforcement of the specification (which could include the arrangement and execution of audits for verifying compliance with the requirements set forth in the specification).
- Completion and delivery conditions (often referring to standardized INCOTERMS).
- Provisions for rejection, reinspection, rehearing, corrective measures
- References and citations for which any instructions in the content maybe required to fulfill the traceability and clarity of the document
- Signatures of approval, if necessary; sometimes specific procedures apply to sign-off / buy-off events.
- Change record to summarize the chronological development, revision and completion if the document is to be circulated internally
- Annexes and Appendices that expand on details, add clarification, or offer options.

== Construction ==
=== North America ===
Specifications in North America form part of the contract documents that accompany and govern the drawings for construction of building and infrastructure projects. Specifications describe the quality and performance of building materials, using code citations and published standards, whereas the drawings or building information model (BIM) illustrates quantity and location of materials. The guiding master document of names and numbers is the latest edition of MasterFormat. This is a consensus document that is jointly sponsored by two professional organizations: Construction Specifications Canada and Construction Specifications Institute based in the United States and updated every two years.

While there is a tendency to believe that "specifications overrule drawings" in the event of discrepancies between the text document and the drawings, the actual intent must be made explicit in the contract between the Owner and the Contractor. The standard AIA (American Institute of Architects) and EJCDC (Engineering Joint Contract Documents Committee) states that the drawings and specifications are complementary, together providing the information required for a complete facility. Many public agencies, such as the Naval Facilities Command (NAVFAC) state that the specifications overrule the drawings. This is based on the idea that words are easier for a jury (or mediator) to interpret than drawings in case of a dispute.

The standard listing of construction specifications falls into 50 Divisions, or broad categories of work types and work results involved in construction. The divisions are subdivided into sections, each one addressing a specific material type (concrete) or a work product (steel door) of the construction work. A specific material may be covered in several locations, depending on the work result: stainless steel (for example) can be covered as a sheet material used in flashing and sheet Metal in division 07; it can be part of a finished product, such as a handrail, covered in division 05; or it can be a component of building hardware, covered in division 08. The original listing of specification divisions was based on the time sequence of construction, working from exterior to interior, and this logic is still somewhat followed as new materials and systems make their way into the construction process.

Each section is subdivided into three distinct parts: "general", "products" and "execution". The MasterFormat and SectionFormat systems can be successfully applied to residential, commercial, civil, and industrial construction. Although many architects find the rather voluminous commercial style of specifications too lengthy for most residential projects and therefore either produce more abbreviated specifications of their own or use ArCHspec (which was specifically created for residential projects). Master specification systems are available from multiple vendors such as Arcom, Visispec, BSD, and Spectext. These systems were created to standardize language across the United States and are usually subscription based.

Specifications can be either "performance-based", whereby the specifier restricts the text to stating the performance that must be achieved by the completed work, "prescriptive" where the specifier states the specific criteria such as fabrication standards applicable to the item, or "proprietary", whereby the specifier indicates specific products, vendors and even contractors that are acceptable for each workscope. In addition, specifications can be "closed" with a specific list of products, or "open" allowing for substitutions made by the constructor. Most construction specifications are a combination of performance-based and proprietary types, naming acceptable manufacturers and products while also specifying certain standards and design criteria that must be met.

While North American specifications are usually restricted to broad descriptions of the work, European ones and Civil work can include actual work quantities, including such things as area of drywall to be built in square meters, like a bill of materials. This type of specification is a collaborative effort between a specification writer and a quantity surveyor. This approach is unusual in North America, where each bidder performs a quantity survey on the basis of both drawings and specifications. In many countries on the European continent, content that might be described as "specifications" in the United States are covered under the building code or municipal code. Civil and infrastructure work in the United States often includes a quantity breakdown of the work to be performed as well.

Although specifications are usually issued by the architect's office, specification writing itself is undertaken by the architect and the various engineers or by specialist specification writers. Specification writing is often a distinct professional trade, with professional certifications such as "Certified Construction Specifier" (CCS) available through the Construction Specifications Institute and the Registered Specification Writer (RSW) through Construction Specifications Canada. Specification writers may be separate entities such as sub-contractors or they may be employees of architects, engineers, or construction management companies. Specification writers frequently meet with manufacturers of building materials who seek to have their products specified on upcoming construction projects so that contractors can include their products in the estimates leading to their proposals.

In February 2015, ArCHspec went live, from ArCH (Architects Creating Homes), a nationwide American professional society of architects whose purpose is to improve residential architecture. ArCHspec was created specifically for use by licensed architects while designing SFR (Single Family Residential) architectural projects. Unlike the more commercial CSI/CSC (50+ division commercial specifications), ArCHspec utilizes the more concise 16 traditional Divisions, plus a Division 0 (Scope & Bid Forms) and Division 17 (low voltage). Many architects, up to this point, did not provide specifications for residential designs, which is one of the reasons ArCHspec was created: to fill a void in the industry with more compact specifications for residential projects. Shorter form specifications documents suitable for residential use are also available through Arcom, and follow the 50 division format, which was adopted in both the United States and Canada starting in 2004. The 16 division format is no longer considered standard, and is not supported by either CSI or CSC, or any of the subscription master specification services, data repositories, product lead systems, and the bulk of governmental agencies.

The United States' Federal Acquisition Regulation governing procurement for the federal government and its agencies stipulates that a copy of the drawings and specifications must be kept available on a construction site.

=== Egypt ===
Specifications in Egypt form part of contract documents. The Housing and Building National Research Center (HBRC) is responsible for developing construction specifications and codes. The HBRC has published more than 15 books which cover building activities like earthworks, plastering, etc.

=== UK ===
Specifications in the UK are part of the contract documents that accompany and govern the construction of a building. They are prepared by construction professionals such as architects, architectural technologists, structural engineers, landscape architects and building services engineers. They are created from previous project specifications, in-house documents or master specifications such as the National Building Specification (NBS). The National Building Specification is owned by the Royal Institute of British Architects (RIBA) through their commercial group RIBA Enterprises (RIBAe). NBS master specifications provide content that is broad and comprehensive, and delivered using software functionality that enables specifiers to customize the content to suit the needs of the project and to keep up to date.

UK project specification types fall into two main categories prescriptive and performance. Prescriptive specifications define the requirements using generic or proprietary descriptions of what is required, whereas performance specifications focus on the outcomes rather than the characteristics of the components. The UK's public sector Procurement Act guidance states that in general, technical standards issued within procurement documents "must refer to performance or functional requirements (and not design, a particular licensing model or descriptive characteristics)".

Specifications are an integral part of Building Information Modeling and cover the non-geometric requirements.

== Food and drug ==
Pharmaceutical products can usually be tested and qualified by various pharmacopoeias. Current existing pharmaceutical standards include:

- British Pharmacopoeia
- European Pharmacopoeia
- Japanese Pharmacopoeia
- The International Pharmacopoeia
- United States Pharmacopeia

If any pharmaceutical product is not covered by the above standards, it can be evaluated by the additional source of pharmacopoeias from other nations, from industrial specifications, or from a standardized formulary such as

- British National Formulary for Children
- British National Formulary
- National Formulary

A similar approach is adopted by the food manufacturing, of which Codex Alimentarius ranks the highest standards, followed by regional and national standards.

The coverage of food and drug standards by ISO is currently less fruitful and not yet put forward as an urgent agenda due to the tight restrictions of regional or national constitution.

Specifications and other standards can be externally imposed as discussed above, but also internal manufacturing and quality specifications. These exist not only for the food or pharmaceutical product but also for the processing machinery, quality processes, packaging, logistics (cold chain), etc. and are exemplified by ISO 14134 and ISO 15609.

The converse of explicit statement of specifications is a process for dealing with observations that are out-of-specification. The United States Food and Drug Administration has published a non-binding recommendation that addresses just this point.

At the present time, much of the information and regulations concerning food and food products remain in a form which makes it difficult to apply automated information processing, storage and transmission methods and techniques.

Data systems that can process, store and transfer information about food and food products need formal specifications for the representations of data about food and food products in order to operate effectively and efficiently.

Development of formal specifications for food and drug data with the necessary and sufficient clarity and precision for use specifically by digital computing systems have begun to emerge from some government agencies and standards organizations: the United States Food and Drug Administration has published specifications for a "Structured Product Label" which drug manufacturers must by mandate use to submit electronically the information on a drug label. Recently, the ISO has made some progress in the area of food and drug standards and formal specifications for data about regulated substances through the publication of ISO 11238.

== Information technology ==
=== Specification need ===
In many contexts, particularly software, specifications are needed to avoid errors due to lack of compatibility, for instance, in interoperability issues.

For instance, when two applications share Unicode data, but use different normal forms or use them incorrectly, in an incompatible way or without sharing a minimum set of interoperability specification, errors and data loss can result. For example, Mac OS X has many components that prefer or require only decomposed characters (thus decomposed-only Unicode encoded with UTF-8 is also known as "UTF8-MAC"). In one specific instance, the combination of OS X errors handling composed characters, and the samba file- and printer-sharing software (which replaces decomposed letters with composed ones when copying file names), has led to confusing and data-destroying interoperability problems.

Applications may avoid such errors by preserving input code points, and normalizing them to only the application's preferred normal form for internal use.

Such errors may also be avoided with algorithms normalizing both strings before any binary comparison.

However errors due to file name encoding incompatibilities have always existed, due to a lack of minimum set of common specification between software hoped to be inter-operable between various file system drivers, operating systems, network protocols, and thousands of software packages.

=== Formal ===
A formal specification is a mathematical description of software or hardware that may be used to develop an implementation. It describes what the system should do, not (necessarily) how the system should do it. Given such a specification, it is possible to use formal verification techniques to demonstrate that a candidate system design is correct with respect to that specification. This has the advantage that incorrect candidate system designs can be revised before a major investment has been made in actually implementing the design. An alternative approach is to use provably correct refinement steps to transform a specification into a design, and ultimately into an actual implementation, that is correct by construction.

=== Architectural ===
In hardware, software, or enterprise systems development, an architectural specification is the set of documentation that describes the structure, behavior, and more views of that system.

=== Program ===
A program specification is the definition of what a computer program is expected to do. It can be informal, in which case it can be considered as a user manual from a developer point of view, or formal, in which case it has a definite meaning defined in mathematical or programmatic terms. In practice, many successful specifications are written to understand and fine-tune applications that were already well-developed, although safety-critical software systems are often carefully specified prior to application development. Specifications are most important for external interfaces that must remain stable.

=== Functional ===
In software development, a functional specification (also, functional spec or specs or functional specifications document (FSD)) is the set of documentation that describes the behavior of a computer program or larger software system. The documentation typically describes various inputs that can be provided to the software system and how the system responds to those inputs.

=== Web service ===
Web services specifications are often under the umbrella of a quality management system.

=== Document ===
These types of documents define how a specific document should be written, which may include, but is not limited to, the systems of a document naming, version, layout, referencing, structuring, appearance, language, copyright, hierarchy or format, etc. Very often, this kind of specifications is complemented by a designated template.

== See also ==
- Benchmarking
- Change control
- Guideline
- Defense Standard
- Design specification
- Diagnostic design specification
- Documentation
- Document management system
- Formal specification
- Functional specification
- Harmonization (standards)
- List of ISO standards
- List of Air Ministry specifications
- Open standard
- Performance testing
- Process specification
- Publicly Available Specification
- Revision control
- Requirements analysis
- Shop drawing
- Specification and Description Language
- Specification tree
- Standardization
- Statistical interference
- Systems engineering
- Submittals (construction)
- Technical documentation
- Technical Standard
- Tolerance (engineering)
- Verification and validation
