= Lotus Air =

Egyptian charter airline

IATA	ICAO	Call sign
LU	TAS	LOTUS FLOWER
- Founded: 1997
- Commenced operations: 1998
- Ceased operations: 2011
- Hubs: Cairo, Sharm el-Sheikh, Hurghada
- Fleet size: 4
- Parent company: Al Fawares Holding
- Headquarters: Cairo, Egypt
- Key people: Adnan Al-Falah (GM)
- Website: www.lotus-air.com

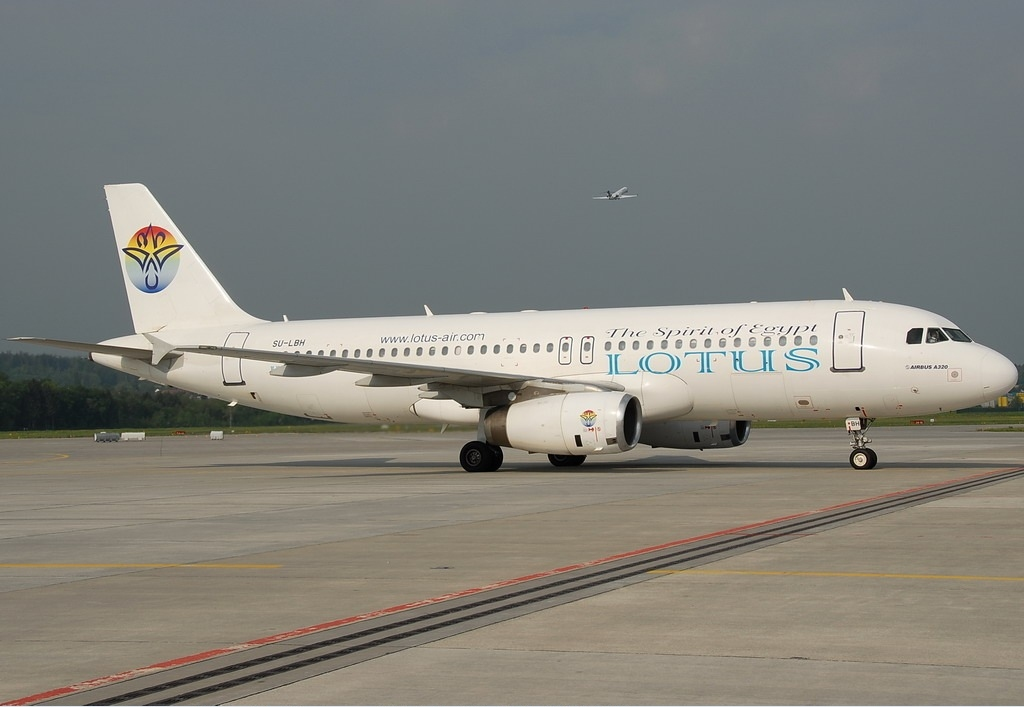
Lotus Air, Airbus 320

Lotus Air was an airline based in Cairo, Egypt. It was a privately owned charter airline flying mainly to Europe. Its main base was Cairo International Airport, with hubs at Sharm el-Sheikh International Airport, Hurghada International Airport and Luxor International Airport.

== History ==
Lotus Air was one of the first private airlines in the Middle East and North Africa region. It was established in 1997 by Al-Fawares Holding Company and commenced operations in 1998.

The main business centred on charter operations, ad-hoc flights, ACMI (Aircraft, Crew, Maintenance, and Insurance) operations, damp leases, technical services, ground handling and crew training.

The airline was the first in Egypt to receive EASA standards maintenance certification and IOSA certification (IATA Operational Safety Audit).

== Fleet ==
The Lotus Air fleet consisted of the following aircraft (at June 2010):

Lotus Air fleet
Aircraft	In service	Orders	Passengers (Economy)	Total
Airbus A320	3	0	180	3
