= Regulation of UAVs in Canada =

Rules for flying drones in Canada

Transport Canada published new rules for flying drones in Canada on January 9, 2019. The rules no longer treat recreational and commercial drone pilots differently but instead categorize operators as basic or advanced with different rules for each. The rules apply to drones between 250 g (0.55 pounds) and 25 kg (55 pounds).

== Incidents ==
On October 12, 2017, the first drone-to-aircraft collision was reported, the first known occurrence in North America. The drone struck a Beechcraft A100 King Air operated by Skyjet that was making a final approach to the Jean Lesage International Airport in Quebec City (CYQB). The A100 was able to land safely with a dent in the left-wing while the drone could not be located by the authorities.

Although the drone was flying approximately 12 km from the airport, the drone was flying at an altitude of approximately 450 m which is well beyond the existing limit allowed in the Transport Canada rules updated in July requiring an altitude of 90 m or less.
