= Property condition assessment =

Property condition assessments (PCAs) (also known as the property condition report, or PCR) are due diligence projects associated with commercial real estate. Commercial property and building inspections are important for clients seeking to know the condition of a property or real estate they may be purchasing, leasing, financing or simply maintaining. Commercial building inspectors generally follow industry accepted guidelines of ASTM E2018 or the International Standards of Practice for Inspecting Commercial Properties (ComSOP). These commercial inspection standards help both the commercial building inspector and the client to understand the scope agreed to for the inspection, including the systems or areas to be inspected, and is used as a guide to develop said scopes and procedures. Often they are done as part of a property transfer and are done along with a Phase I Environmental Site Assessment. PCAs are not to be confused with facility condition assessments, which are similar in nature but serve a different purpose.

Depending on client needs or accepted risks, and property types, some inspections can require the involvement of specialists, and some can be done by a general commercial building inspector or engineer. Each varying degree of review or assessment will involve various costs and time frames.

Once the PCA is completed, a written report is compiled and delivered to the client within an acceptable time frame. The report may include such items as concerns observed, recommendations for repairs or further inspections, opinions of the likely cost of future capital projects, and Americans with Disabilities Act (ADA) compliance surveys.

== History ==
The PCA process began to formalize in the early 1990s as a response to the Resolution Trust Corporation, and as more pension-fund type investors started to take an interest in commercial real estate. It became standard operating procedure to obtain a PCA at the time of purchase or refinancing of commercial properties. The process of performing PCAs began to become routine and formalized with the increased demand; however, there were still many inconsistencies. A 1995 Standard & Poor's Guide further defined the process. In 1999 ASTM released a standard called 2018–99. Since 2000, tremendous growth in the securitized lending market, or commercial mortgage-backed securities, caused a spike in the completion of these reports as they were required to complete a deal. The ComSOP was originally approved as an International Standard on November 24, 2008. It was last revised in 2019, and supersedes all previous editions. This has led to advancements and convergence on the scope, methodology and cost. ASTM 2018-15 and ComSOP 2018 are generally accepted in the industry as the current guidance for content and practice.

PCAs are used by various parties to support their financial modeling of the property. They are intended to be unbiased technical opinions of the upcoming capital work required at the property, but can reflect the ownership strategy of the building owner. For example, a long-term building owner like a pension fund may take a different approach to capital projects than an owner with a shorter-term ownership horizon. The PCA author strives to understand the ownership objectives so they can be considered when developing the list of forecasted projects.

Individual owners, buyer and lessees also order PCAs for knowledge of general conditions before leasing or purchasing, and upon the termination of a lease for proof of any required maintenance or deposit recovery.

== Scope ==
PCAs utilize building diagnostics to identify problems, but diagnostics go further to determine solutions and predict outcomes to the found problems. A PCA covers eleven major areas:

1. Building site (topography, drainage, retaining walls, paving, curbing, lighting)
2. Building envelope (windows and walls)
3. Structural (foundation and framing)
4. Interior elements (stairways, hallways, common areas)
5. Roofing systems
6. Mechanical systems (heating, ventilation, and air conditioning)
7. Plumbing
8. Electrical systems
9. Vertical transportation (elevators and escalators)
10. Life safety, ADA, code compliance, air quality (fire codes, accessibility, water intrusion, mold)
11. Optionally: site-specific testing, like infrared thermography for energy loss, air leakage, roofing and building envelope moisture intrusion

The site inspection should be a thorough and representative picture of the structure and above mentioned building systems. For larger buildings, a rule of thumb is to view 10% of the building; however, depending on the structure, floor plan and building systems, this may not be enough to afford a representative picture. The report should include a narrative summary of the building type and condition, and cost tables of the immediate and long-term expenses of the building maintenance.

== Value proposition and users ==
The users of a PCA may include a seller, a potential buyer, a lender, an investor or an owner.

The reports may be of use for:

- Negotiating the purchase price of a property (buyer)
- Capital or strategic planning (an owner)
- Loan approval (a lender)
- Triple Net Lease (NNN) (lessee/leassor)
- Predictive/preventive maintenance
- Insurance evaluations (an owner, insurance agency)

== Cost tables ==
The executive summary of a PCR is effectively the replacement reserves cost table. The report may be 20-40 pages in length; however, this table summarizes most of the deferred maintenance items found.

These tables may be from 8 years in length to 40 or even more. The typical table is 12 years for most CMBS work (loan term plus two years).

Properties fall into one of two main categories. They are either per unit/bed/pad/room (apartment, hospital, mobile home park, hotel, respectively), or done on a square foot basis (commercial and industrial).
