= 50 Divisions =

Information system in building construction

50 Divisions refers to the 50 divisions of construction information, as defined by the Construction Specifications Institute (CSI)'s MasterFormat beginning in 2004. Before 2004, MasterFormat consisted of 16 Divisions. MasterFormat has continued to be updated and revised since 2004, with new numbers, titles, and a new division added in 2010 and additional updates completed in 2010, 2011, 2012, 2014, 2016, and 2018.

"50 Divisions" is the most widely used standard for organizing specifications and other written information for commercial and institutional building projects in the United States and Canada. Standardizing the presentation of such information improves communication among all parties.

== Divisions ==
The latest officially released version of MasterFormat is the 2018 Edition, which uses the following Divisions:

PROCUREMENT AND CONTRACTING REQUIREMENTS GROUP:

- Division 00 — Procurement and Contracting Requirements

SPECIFICATIONS GROUP

General Requirements Subgroup

- Division 01 — General Requirements

Facility Construction Subgroup

- Division 02 — Existing Conditions
- Division 03 — Concrete
- Division 04 — Masonry
- Division 05 — Metals
- Division 06 — Wood, Plastics, and Composites
- Division 07 — Thermal and Moisture Protection
- Division 08 — Openings
- Division 09 — Finishes
- Division 10 — Specialties
- Division 11 — Equipment
- Division 12 — Furnishings
- Division 13 — Special Construction
- Division 14 — Conveying Equipment
- Division 15 — Plumbing + HVAC
- Division 16 — Electrical + Lighting
- Division 17 — RESERVED FOR FUTURE EXPANSION
- Division 18 — RESERVED FOR FUTURE EXPANSION
- Division 19 — RESERVED FOR FUTURE EXPANSION

Facility Services Subgroup:

- Division 20 — Mechanical Support
- Division 21 — Fire Suppression
- Division 22 — Plumbing
- Division 23 — Heating Ventilating and Air Conditioning
- Division 24 — RESERVED FOR FUTURE EXPANSION
- Division 25 — Integrated Automation
- Division 26 — Electrical
- Division 27 — Communications
- Division 28 — Electronic Safety and Security
- Division 29 — RESERVED FOR FUTURE EXPANSION

Site and Infrastructure Subgroup:

- Division 30 — RESERVED FOR FUTURE EXPANSION
- Division 31 — Earthwork
- Division 32 — Exterior Improvements
- Division 33 — Utilities
- Division 34 — Transportation
- Division 35 — Waterways and Marine Construction
- Division 36 — RESERVED FOR FUTURE EXPANSION
- Division 37 — RESERVED FOR FUTURE EXPANSION
- Division 38 — RESERVED FOR FUTURE EXPANSION
- Division 39 — RESERVED FOR FUTURE EXPANSION

Process Equipment Subgroup:

- Division 40 — Process Interconnections
- Division 41 — Material Processing and Handling Equipment
- Division 42 — Process Heating, Cooling, and Drying Equipment
- Division 43 — Process Gas and Liquid Handling, Purification and Storage Equipment
- Division 44 — Pollution Control Equipment
- Division 45 — Industry-Specific Manufacturing Equipment
- Division 46 — Water and Wastewater Equipment
- Division 47 — RESERVED FOR FUTURE EXPANSION
- Division 48 — Electrical Power Generation
- Division 49 — RESERVED FOR FUTURE EXPANSION
