= MasterSpec =

MasterSpec is a master guide building and construction specification system used within the United States by architects, engineers, landscape architects, and interior designers to express results expected in construction. MasterSpec content and software is exclusively developed and distributed by Deltek (formerly Avitru) for the American Institute of Architects (AIA). It was developed in 1969 by the AIA to provide architects a means to create technical specifications without spending a lot of time researching products and writing up to date technical specifications from scratch. Content for MasterSpec is vetted by AIA-sponsored architectural and engineering review committees. In 2019, the company was acquired by Deltek, Inc.

== Content Libraries ==
Today, MasterSpec consists of over 900 sections packaged in practice-specific libraries, following the MasterFormat 2018 standard:

- Landscape
- Site/Civil
- Structural
- Historic Preservation
- Commissioning
- Interiors
- Mechanical
- Electrical + Communication
- Architectural
- Building Architecture + Engineering

Each MasterSpec section is organized into three parts following SectionFormat and consists of 5 components:

- Summary - Overview of section scope and content
- Evaluations - Qualitative overview of products and discussion of recent technologies, including:
  - Testing procedures and applicable codes
  - Application and implementation suggestions
  - Environmental considerations, green building, or LEED information
  - References and standards
  - Links to the manufacturer and standards organizations
- Master guide technical specifications in three-part CSI format along with editor's notes (instructions) and cross-references to Evaluations.
- Drawing Coordination Checklist: - Checklist of items to coordinate section with the drawings.
- Specification Coordination Checklist - Checklist of items to coordinate this section with other sections.

=== Formats ===
The MasterSpec technical specifications are available in three distinct formats or type:

- Full Length - For moderate- to large-scale, complex projects and varied bidding and contracting situations
- Short Form - Abridged versions of the sections with most common products
- Outline - Corresponding outline specifications for use during design development and schematic phases

== Timeline ==
- 1969: AIA’s MasterSpec is first distributed in paper form and includes Architectural and Civil & Structural Engineering Content
- 1973: ARCOM provides MasterSpec in ASCII format on magnetic tape
- 1984: MasterSpec is distributed only in floppy disc format and paper
- 1988: AIA assigns ARCOM to be the exclusive developer and distributor of all electronic and paper versions of MasterSpec; AIA dissolves contracts with all other “Automators,” asking them to work under ARCOM
- 1995: AIA awards ARCOM exclusive license to develop and distribute MasterSpec
- 1999: ARCOM introduces MasterSpec on CD-ROM
- 2005: ARCOM issues MasterSpec in MasterFormat 2006 a major change in the 40 year old organization of specifications
- 2017:
  - ARCOM acquires InterSpec. This brings e-SPECS and specification services to ARCOM
  - ARCOM changes name to Avitru as part of acquiring InterSpec
- 2019: Deltek acquires Avitru
