= 16 Divisions =

US construction standard

The 16 Divisions of construction, as defined by the Construction Specifications Institute (CSI)'s MasterFormat, is the most widely used standard for organizing specifications and other written information for commercial and institutional building projects in the U.S. and Canada. In 2004, MasterFormat was updated and expanded to 50 Divisions. It provides a master list of divisions, and section numbers and titles within each division, to follow in organizing information about a facility's construction requirements and associated activities. Standardizing the presentation of such information improves communication among all parties involved in construction projects.

== Divisions ==
The following are the sixteen divisions listed in the Master Format 1995 Edition.

- Division 01 — General Requirement
- Division 02 — Site Works
- Division 03 — Concrete
- Division 04 — Masonry
- Division 05 — Metals
- Division 06 — Wood and Plastics
- Division 07 — Thermal and Moisture Protection
- Division 08 — Doors and Windows
- Division 09 — Finishes
- Division 10 — Specialties
- Division 11 — Equipment
- Division 12 — Furnishings
- Division 13 — Special Construction
- Division 14 — Conveying Systems
- Division 15 — Mechanical/Plumbing
- Division 16 — Electrical
- DIVISION 17 - MASTER FORMAT RELATED SPECS, NONCONFORMING TO THE ABOVE CSI SECTIONS
  All spec divisions higher than 16 are placed in Division 17 - Others. Also use Division 17-Others for any spec-shaped material not easily classified (e.g., geotechnical, pre-bid notes, etc.)
