= Building diagnostics =

Building diagnostics is the process of determining the causes and solutions to problems in buildings. More specifically, building diagnostics are holistic process of data collection methods and techniques regarding inspection and analysis, and of prediction of faults/abnormality/defects in the condition, internal environment and performance of a building or structure, extending to services offered in the building. The three main types include commissioning, monitoring, and investigation diagnostics. This process can be carried out unaided (using naked eye) but often aided by advanced technology such as infrared thermography, ultrasound, radar, vibration, and lasers. The end product of building diagnostics is a prediction of the likely causes of the found defects/faults in building and suggestion of appropriate remedial building solutions.

As part of a property condition assessment or home inspection building diagnostics is not an exact science and is subjective. Very often, final professional judgment is required. It is important that this final judgment can only be made after careful diagnostic process has been properly performed. Otherwise the prediction can only be regarded as a guess.

Practitioners of building diagnostics are called building diagnosticians who are equipped with the specialist knowledge and skills required.

== See also ==
- Building science
