= Skyjet Airlines =

IATA	ICAO	Call sign
UQ	SJU	SKYJET
- Founded: 2003
- Focus cities: Kampala, Entebbe, Juba, Khartoum
- Fleet size: 2
- Destinations: 9
- Parent company: Skyjet Aviation (Uganda) Ltd.
- Headquarters: Airlines House, Kimathi Avenue, Kampala, Uganda
- Key people: Capt. Ahmed Shawgi Mustafa, Managing Director
- Website: http://www.fly-skyjet.com

Skyjet Airlines was a private airline in Uganda that provided civilian passenger and cargo commercial services. Established as a cargo airline in 2003, Skyjet Airlines started passenger services on February 1, 2009. The company headquarters are located in Kampala while the main base of operation is located at Entebbe International Airport. It halted operations on June 30, 2009.

== Fleet ==
Skyjet Airlines has the following aircraft in its fleet, as of February 2009:

- two (2) Boeing 737-200
