= Wood Destroying Insect Report =

Report generated during home inspection while looking for wood-destroying insects

A Wood Destroying Insect Report (WDI Report) is generated during a home inspection while looking for wood destroying insects such as termites, carpenter bees, carpenter ants, and powder post beetles. A WDI Report are required in some states, such as Texas, when buying a new home.
