= MasterFormat =

System for organizing construction project manuals

MasterFormat is a standard for organizing specifications and other written information for commercial and institutional building projects in the U.S. and Canada. Sometimes referred to as the "Dewey Decimal System" of building construction, MasterFormat is a product of the Construction Specifications Institute (CSI) and Construction Specifications Canada (CSC). It provides a master list of Divisions, and Sections within each Division, to organize information about a facility’s construction requirements and associated activities.

MasterFormat is used throughout the construction industry to format specifications for construction contract documents. By organizing information into distinct groups, it assists in both creating and searching through the documents. The information contained in MasterFormat is organized in a standardized outline format within 50 Divisions (16 Divisions pre-2004). Each Division is subdivided into a number of Sections.

== History ==
After World War II, building construction specifications began to expand as more advanced materials and choices were made available. The Construction Specifications Institute (CSI) was founded in 1948 and began to address the organization of specifications into a numbering system. In 1963, they published a format for construction specifications, outlining 16 major divisions of work. A 1975 CSI publication used the term MasterFormat. The last CSI MasterFormat publication to use the 16 divisions was in 1995, and this is no longer supported by CSI. In November 2004, MasterFormat expanded from 16 Divisions to 50 Divisions, reflecting innovations in the construction industry and expanding the coverage to a larger part of the construction industry. Revised editions were published in 2010, 2011, 2012, 2014, 2016, 2018, and 2020.

=== Timeline ===
- 1963: CSI introduces MasterFormat data as part of CSI Format for Construction Specifications
- 1966: CSC produced The Building Construction Index with similar data
- 1972: CSI and CSC merge their systems and publish as Uniform Construction Index
- 1978: First published under the name MasterFormat
- 1995: Extensive public review with industry users
- 2004: Major expansion to address overcrowded divisions. Additional divisions added to include infrastructure and process equipment divisions.

== Advantages ==
Standardizing the presentation of such information improves communication among all parties involved in construction projects, which helps the project team deliver structures to owners according to their requirements, timelines, and budgets. The ASTM standard for sustainability assessment of building products relies on MasterFormat to organize the data. MasterFormat is an organizational component of Building Systems Design - SpecLink, MasterSpec, SpecText, National Master Specification (NMS), and SpecsIntact systems. Manufacturers will often publish specifications for their products based on MasterFormat. Design teams may maintain office master section based on MasterFormat and pull specifications from multiple sources. MasterFormat provides the overall organizational structure that makes pulling sections from different sources coherent.

MasterSpec and SpecText are specifications targeted to construction projects in the United States. NMS is targeted to construction projects in Canada. SpecsIntact is a specification processing system for preparing Unified Facilities Guide Specifications (UFGS). UFGS is required for design teams to use on United States Department of Defense and NASA construction projects. Using MasterFormat provides the design and construction teams a familiar organizational structure.

== Current Divisions (August 2020) ==
The current MasterFormat Divisions are:

PROCUREMENT AND CONTRACTING REQUIREMENTS GROUP

- Division 00 — Procurement and Contracting Requirements

SPECIFICATIONS GROUP

General Requirements Subgroup

- Division 01 — General Requirements

Facility Construction Subgroup

- Division 02 — Existing Conditions
- Division 03 — Concrete
- Division 04 — Masonry
- Division 05 — Metals
- Division 06 — Wood, Plastics, and Composites
- Division 07 — Thermal and Moisture Protection
- Division 08 — Openings
- Division 09 — Finishes
- Division 10 — Specialties
- Division 11 — Equipment
- Division 12 — Furnishings
- Division 13 — Special Construction
- Division 14 — Conveying Equipment

Facility Services Subgroup:

- Division 21 — Fire Suppression
- Division 22 — Plumbing
- Division 23 — Heating, Ventilating, and Air Conditioning (HVAC)
- Division 25 — Integrated Automation
- Division 26 — Electrical
- Division 27 — Communications
- Division 28 — Electronic Safety and Security

Site and Infrastructure Subgroup:

- Division 31 — Earthwork
- Division 32 — Exterior Improvements
- Division 33 — Utilities
- Division 34 — Transportation
- Division 35 — Waterway and Marine Construction

Process Equipment Subgroup:

- Division 40 — Process Interconnections
- Division 41 — Material Processing and Handling Equipment
- Division 42 — Process Heating, Cooling, and Drying Equipment
- Division 43 — Process Gas and Liquid Handling, Purification and Storage Equipment
- Division 44 — Pollution and Waste Control Equipment
- Division 45 — Industry-Specific Manufacturing Equipment
- Division 46 — Water and Wastewater Equipment
- Division 48 — Electrical Power Generation

== Pre-2020 Divisions ==
MASTERFORMAT 2018 EDITION

Same as MasterFormat 2016.

MASTERFORMAT 2016 EDITION

Same as MasterFormat 2014.

MASTERFORMAT 2014 EDITION

Same as MasterFormat 2012, except the following:

- Division 40 — Process Interconnections (changed title)

MASTERFORMAT 2012 EDITION

Same as MasterFormat 2010.

MASTERFORMAT 2010 EDITION

Same as MasterFormat 2004, except the following:

- Division 46 — Water and Wastewater Equipment (added)

MASTERFORMAT 2004 EDITION

Changed to 50 Divisions. All divisions were revised.

MASTERFORMAT 1995 EDITION

Same as MasterFormat 1988 except the following:

- Division 2 — Site Construction

MASTERFORMAT 1988 EDITION

Before November 2004, MasterFormat was composed of 16 Divisions:

- Division 1 — General Requirements
- Division 2 — Sitework
- Division 3 — Concrete
- Division 4 — Masonry
- Division 5 — Metals
- Division 6 — Wood and Plastics
- Division 7 — Thermal and Moisture Protection
- Division 8 — Doors and Windows
- Division 9 — Finishes
- Division 10 — Specialties
- Division 11 — Equipment
- Division 12 — Furnishings
- Division 13 — Special Construction
- Division 14 — Conveying Systems
- Division 15 — Mechanical (Ex. Plumbing and HVAC)
- Division 16 — Electrical

== Related organizational formats ==
- SectionFormat is a standard for organizing information within each Section. Like MasterFormat, SectionFormat is a joint publication of the Construction Specifications Institute (CSI) and Construction Specifications Canada (CSC). It is used by MasterSpec, SpecText, NMS, and SpecsIntact systems. It is also common among manufacture specifications and design firm office masters. A Section is divided into three Parts; "Part 1 - General," "Part 2 - Products," and "Part 3 - Execution." Each Part is further organized into a system of Articles and Paragraphs. MasterFormat's Division 01 is extensively coordinated with SectionFormat's Part 1 to reduce duplication of requirements common to multiple sections.
- PageFormat is a standard for formatting text within a section. Like MasterFormat, PageFormat is a joint publication of the Construction Specifications Institute (CSI) and Construction Specifications Canada (CSC). It is used by MasterSpec, SpecText, and NMS. Design firms often use a modified version of PageFormat. SpecsIntact does not use PageFormat.
- A relatively new strategy to classify the built environment, named OmniClass, incorporates the work results classification in its Table 22 Work Results.
- The National Building Specification is a British specification standard.
