= Construction Specifications Institute =

Building construction association

- Abbreviation: CSI
- Formation: March 1948; 78 years ago
- Type: Professional association
- Headquarters: Alexandria, Virginia
- Coordinates: 38.804°N 77.040°W
- Region served: United States
- Official language: English
- CEO: Mark Dorsey
- Board of directors: Arthur "Cam" Featherstonhaugh IV, Chair; William Sundquist, Chair Elect; Jori Smith, Secretary; Michael Young, Treasurer; Jarrod Mann; Kevin Wang; Morayma Bittle; Ivette Ramirex Bruns; Patrick Comerford; Lynsey Hankins; Amy Hockett; Thomas A. Lanzelotti; Betina Latiker; Georgia Spencer; Robert Vaughn; Andrea Zawodny
- Volunteers: 1000+ (1000+)
- Website: www.csiresources.org

The Construction Specifications Institute (CSI) is a United States national association of more than 6,000 construction industry professionals who are experts in building construction and the materials used therein. The institute is dedicated to improving the communication of construction information through a diversified membership base of allied professionals involved in the creation and management of the built environment, continuous development and transformation of standards and formats, education and certification of professionals to improve project delivery processes, and creation of practice tools to assist users throughout the facility life-cycle. The work of CSI is currently focused in three areas being standards and publications, construction industry professional certifications, and continuing education for construction professionals.

== History ==
CSI was founded in March 1948 by the specification writers of government agencies who came together to improve the quality of construction specifications. The institute's efforts were essential in improving construction specification quality so that it could meet the demands of the post-war construction boom. Development of specifications best practices, promulgating standards and formats to improve the organization of specification information, professional education, and certification were cornerstones of the institute.

The Institute grew quickly to include specification writers in the private sector.

In November 2010, CSI acquired Building Systems Design (BSD) to help advance software tools for specifications development and communication of building information across the building team. BSD is a software firm that is a leading developer of commercial master specifications and construction cost estimating software. BSD is involved in the development and maintenance of several of CSI format documents including MasterFormat, UniFormat, and OmniClass, all of which relate to specifications and cost estimating. In 2017, BSD was the subject of a management buy-out backed by Caltius, leaving CSI with a minority stake in the business. In June 2019, BSD was acquired by Germany-based RIB Software, but will maintain its relationships with CSI and Construction Specifications Canada (CSC).

Also around 2019, CSI formed Construction Information Network, LLC—a wholly-owned for-profit subsidiary which, in 2020, launched Crosswalk, converting the classification standards into a digital interface, and marking a distinct shift in how CSI distributed its standards. "The Construction Standard" is a trademark and trading style of Construction Information Network, LLC, and began operating publicly in July 2025. In February 2026, CSI rolled out "The Construction Standard" (incorporating a digital platform - CSI Dynamic Standards, CDS) to control licensing and protect its MasterFormat (now in a 2026 edition), OmniClass and UniFormat trademarks.

== CSI Standards ==
=== MasterFormat ===
CSI publishes MasterFormat, which is a standardized classification for construction information, such as detailed construction project cost estimates or construction specifications. Since its debut under another title in 1963, MasterFormat consisted of 16 Divisions representing broad categories of construction, such as Masonry, Concrete, Electrical, Finishes, or Mechanical. In November 2004, a revised edition of MasterFormat was published that expanded the categories to 50 Divisions, reflecting the growing complexity of the construction industry, incorporation of a broader array of construction project types, and addition of facility life cycle and maintenance information into the classification. With this expansion, MasterFormat was positioned to help facilitate Building Information Modeling (BIM) to contain project specifications.

The MasterFormat standard serves as the organizational structure for construction industry publications such as the Sweets catalog and ARCAT with a wide range of building products, and master guide specification products such as MasterSpec and BSD SpecLink. MasterFormat helps architects, engineers, owners, contractors, and manufacturers classify the construction of work results using a variety of construction resources. The MasterFormat sections within the Divisions can also be used to reference performance and safety requirements generated by agencies such as the American Society for Testing and Materials (ASTM) and the Occupational Safety and Health Administration (OSHA), among others.

=== UniFormat ===
UniFormat is a construction classification system organized by functional elements in a construction project. Functional elements are defined as "constituent parts of a construction entity with a characteristic function, form, or position." Unlike the content of MasterFormat, most content in UniFormat is described without reference to specific means of achieving the function the element serves.

The first edition of UniFormat was published by CSI in 1992. New and revised editions of UniFormat were published by CSI in 1998 and 2010.

Titles in UniFormat Levels 1 through 3 can be applied to most project descriptions and preliminary cost estimates. Levels 4 and below provide a more detailed breakdown of the functional elements.

=== SectionFormat/PageFormat ===
SectionFormat provides a standard arrangement of construction specification sections into three parts:

- Part 1 General, which includes administrative and procedural requirements unique to the section, expanding on subjects covered in Division 01 and adding information unique to the section.
- Part 2 Products, which describes the systems, assemblies, equipment, products, materials, fabrications, and mixes that are to be incorporated into the project.
- Part 3, Execution, which includes requirements for field/site installation or application, including preparatory actions and post-installation cleaning and protection.

This arrangement of specification section information is otherwise known as “three-part format” and is expected and commonplace throughout the North American construction industry. CSI first published SectionFormat in 1969, the most current edition was published in 2008.

PageFormat provides a recommended style guide for presenting the titles and content of construction specifications sections as described by SectionFormat. CSI first published PageFormat in 1975.

SectionFormat and PageFormat were published as separate publications until the 2008 edition, when they were combined into a single publication

=== GreenFormat ===
CSI's GreenFormat is a standardized structure for organizing sustainable information elements associated with materials, products, systems, and technologies used in construction projects. By using this standardized format, manufacturers are assisted in identifying key product characteristics and providing designers, constructors, and building operators with information needed to help meet sustainable design and operation goals. The identification of the criteria, standards, and applicable certifications using GreenFormat provides designers, constructors, and building operators an effective way to evaluate the sustainable characteristics of materials, products, and processes for selection purposes.

GreenFormat arranges sustainable product information into five categories:

1. Product General Information
2. Product Properties
3. Product Life Cycle
4. Manufacturer Sustainability Policies
5. Manufacturer Support Documentation

CSI first published GreenFormat in 2009, the most current edition was published in 2015.

=== Uniform Drawing System ===
CSI's Uniform Drawing System is part of the National CAD Standard (NCS), together with the American Institute of Architects (AIA)'s CAD Layer Guidelines. Administered by the National Institute of Building Sciences (NIBS), the NCS coordinates these CAD-related publications to allow consistent and streamlined communication among owners and design/construction teams.

== CSI Practice Guides ==
The CSI Practice Guide series debuted in 2011. This series replaced the CSI Project Resource Manual (PRM), first published in 2004, and the CSI Manual of Practice (MOP), published from 1967 until 2004. The Practice Guides are best practice references for construction industry professionals.

=== Project Delivery Practice Guide ===
The CSI Project Delivery Practice Guide (PDPG) is the introductory volume in the Practice Guide Series. The PDPG presents an overview of the process needed to conceive, design, construct, and maintain a construction project. This Guide describes the many parts of that process and the inter-related roles of the various participants in the process. The second edition was published by CSI in 2017, and the most current edition, the third edition, was published by CSI in 2020.

=== Construction Specifications Practice Guide ===
The CSI Construction Specifications Practice Guide (CSPG) describes the process needed to effectively communicate a project design from the designer to the contractor and other members of the project team for the process of project conception, design, construction, and operation. The successful communication of a project design depends on the creation of a complete and coordinated set of construction documents both graphical and written.

The CSPG serves as a guidebook to the preparation, organization, and coordination of construction documents and focuses on the written description of a project and how that description relates to the other construction documents, the best practices for product selection and the roles and responsibilities of the parties to the process of design and construction.

The first edition of the CSPG, first published by CSI in 2011, is the most current edition.

=== Construction Contract Administration Practice Guide ===
The CSI Construction Contract Administration Practice Guide (CCAPG) provides a detailed discussion of the process of successfully delivering a construction project, focused on the roles of the various participants in the process and their relationship to one as described by contractual requirements in standard construction contracts. The responsibilities of team members are set forth in the contract documents and can differ depending on the method of project delivery selected for a project, the CCAPG describes these different responsibilities and recommendations for successful execution of a project.

The first edition of the CCAPG was published by CSI in 2011, and the current edition, the second edition, was published by CSI in 2020.

=== Construction Product Representation Practice Guide ===
The CSI Construction Product Representation Practice Guide (PRPG) provides a detailed discussion of the sales and marketing of products used in the construction process, and the contributions that knowledgeable product representatives are expected to make to the design, construction, and maintenance of facilities. The PRPG provides best practice recommendations for effective construction product representation.

The first edition of the PRPG, first published by CSI in 2011, is the most current edition.

== CSI Certifications ==
CSI is renowned in the construction industry for the longevity and discipline of its professional certification programs. These certifications all signify attainment of a level of knowledge and experience in specific practice areas in construction. All CSI certifications require meeting a minimum level of education or experience to qualify to sit for the certification exams, and completion of continuing education to qualify for renewal of the credential.

=== Construction Documents Technology (CDT) ===
First awarded in 1986, the CDT is a comprehensive overview for anyone who writes, interprets, enforces, or manages construction documents. The CDT credential was initially offered as a certificate, and was transitioned to a professional certification in April 2018.

Over 20,000 professionals currently hold the CDT credential.

=== Certified Construction Specifier (CCS) ===
Awarded since 1978, the Certified Construction Specifier (CCS) certification demonstrates excellence and experience in specifications and contract document preparation.

Over 800 professionals currently hold the CCS credential.

=== Certified Construction Contract Administrator (CCCA) ===
First awarded in 1991, the CCCA demonstrates deep knowledge about all facets of the construction project delivery process, the terms of and relationships established by standard construction contracts, and best practices for administration of those contracts to ensure construction results match owner needs.

Over 725 professionals currently hold the CCCA credential.

=== Certified Construction Product Representative (CCPR) ===
First awarded in 1989, The CCPR demonstrates an in-depth understanding of the construction process, the information needs of designers and contractors, and a superior ability in meeting those needs through effective communication of construction product properties and functions.

Over 150 professionals currently hold the CCPR credential.

== See also ==
- Specification (technical standard)
