= List of ISO standards 12000–13999 =

This is a list of published (Note: This list generally excludes draft versions.) International Organization for Standardization (ISO) standards and other deliverables. (Note: ISO deliverables include "specifications" (ISO/PAS, ISO/TS), "reports" (ISO/TR), etc, which are not referred to by ISO as "standards".) For a complete and up-to-date list of all the ISO standards, see the ISO catalogue.

The standards are protected by copyright and most of them must be purchased. However, about 300 of the standards produced by ISO and IEC's Joint Technical Committee 1 (JTC 1) have been made freely and publicly available.

== ISO 12000 – ISO 12999 ==
- ISO 12001:1996 Acoustics – Noise emitted by machinery and equipment – Rules for the drafting and presentation of a noise test code
- ISO 12005:2003 Lasers and laser-related equipment – Test methods for laser beam parameters – Polarization
- ISO 12006 Building construction – Organization of information about construction works
- ISO 12013:2012 Paints and varnishes — Determination of curing characteristics using a free damped oscillation method —
- ISO/TS 12025:2012 Nano materials – Quantification of nano-object release from powders by generation of aerosols
- ISO/IEC 12042:1993 Information technology – Data compression for information interchange – Binary arithmetic coding algorithm
- ISO 12052:2017 Health informatics – Digital imaging and communication in medicine (DICOM) including workflow and data management
- ISO 12083:1994 Information and documentation - Electronic manuscript preparation and markup
- ISO 12085:1996 Geometrical Product Specifications (GPS) - Surface texture: Profile method - Motif parameters
- ISO/IEC 12087 Information technology - Computer graphics and image processing - Image Processing and Interchange (IPI) - Functional specification
  - ISO/IEC 12087-1:1995 Part 1: Common architecture for imaging
  - ISO/IEC 12087-2:1994 Part 2: Programmer's imaging kernel system application programme interface
  - ISO/IEC 12087-3:1995 Part 3: Image Interchange Facility (IIF)
  - ISO/IEC 12087-5:1998 Part 5: Basic Image Interchange Format (BIIF)
- ISO/IEC 12088-4:1995 Information technology - Computer graphics and image processing - Image processing and interchange - Application program interface language bindings
- ISO/IEC 12089:1997 Information technology - Computer graphics and image processing - Encoding for the Image Interchange Facility (IIF)
- ISO 12100 Safety of machinery – General principles for design – Risk assessment and risk reduction
- ISO/IEC 12139 Information technology – Telecommunications and information exchange between systems – Powerline communication (PLC) – High speed PLC medium access control (MAC) and physical layer (PHY)
- ISO/IEC 12097:2002 Road vehicles -- Airbag components
  - ISO/IEC 12139-1:2009 Part 1: General requirements
- ISO 12163:1999 Dental baseplate/modelling wax [Withdrawn: replaced with ISO 15854]
- ISO 12164 Hollow taper interface with flange contact surface
  - ISO 12164-1:2001 Part 1: Shanks — Dimensions
  - ISO 12164-2:2001 Part 2: Receivers — Dimensions
  - ISO 12164-3:2014 Part 3: Dimensions of shanks for stationary tools
  - ISO 12164-4:2014 Part 4: Dimensions of receivers for stationary tools
- ISO 12165:2000 Tools for moulding - Components of compression and injection moulds and diecasting dies - Terms and symbols
- ISO 12176 Plastics pipes and fittings – Equipment for fusion jointing polyethylene systems
  - ISO 12176-3:2011 Part 3: Operator's badge
- ISO 12179:2000 Geometrical Product Specifications (GPS) – Surface texture: Profile method – Calibration of contact (stylus) instruments
- ISO 12180 Geometrical product specifications (GPS) - Cylindricity
  - ISO 12180-1:2011 Part 1: Vocabulary and parameters of cylindrical form
  - ISO 12180-2:2011 Part 2: Specification operators
- ISO 12181 Geometrical product specifications (GPS) - Roundness
  - ISO 12181-1:2011 Part 1: Vocabulary and parameters of roundness
  - ISO 12181-2:2011 Part 2: Specification operators
- ISO/IEC TR 12182:2015 Systems and software engineering - Framework for categorization of IT systems and software, and guide for applying it
- ISO 12188 Tractors and machinery for agriculture and forestry – Test procedures for positioning and guidance systems in agriculture
  - ISO 12188-1:2010 Part 1: Dynamic testing of satellite-based positioning devices
  - ISO 12188-2:2012 Part 2: Testing of satellite-based auto-guidance systems during straight and level travel
- ISO 12189:2008 Implants for surgery – Mechanical testing of implantable spinal devices – Fatigue test method for spinal implant assemblies using an anterior support
- ISO 12199:2000 Alphabetical ordering of multilingual terminological and lexicographical data represented in the Latin alphabet
- ISO/IEC 12207 Systems and software engineering – Software life cycle processes
- ISO 12231:2012 Photography - Electronic still picture imaging - Vocabulary
- ISO 12242:2012 Measurement of fluid flow in closed conduits – Ultrasonic transit-time meters for liquid
- ISO/IEC 12246:1993 Information technology – 8 mm wide magnetic tape cartridge dual azimuth format for information interchange – Helical scan recording
- ISO/IEC 12247:1993 Information technology – 3.81 mm wide magnetic tape cartridge for information interchange – Helical scan recording – DDS format using 60 m and 90 m length tapes
- ISO/IEC 12248:1993 Information technology – 3.81 mm wide magnetic tape cartridge for information interchange – Helical scan recording – DATA/DAT-DC format using 60 m and 90 m length tapes
- ISO/TR 12300:2014 Health informatics – Principles of mapping between terminological systems
- ISO/TR 12309:2009 Health informatics – Guidelines for terminology development organizations
- ISO/TR 12310:2015 Health informatics – Principles and guidelines for the measurement of conformance in the implementation of terminological systems
- ISO 12353 Road vehicles – Traffic accident analysis
  - ISO 12353-1:2002 Part 1: Vocabulary
- ISO/IEC TR 12382:1992 Permuted index of the vocabulary of information technology
- ISO 12417 Cardiovascular implants and extracorporeal systems – Vascular device-drug combination products
  - ISO 12417-1:2015 Part 1: General requirements
- ISO 12543 Glass in building – Laminated glass and laminated safety glass
  - ISO 12543-1:2011 Part 1: Definitions and description of component parts
- ISO 12615:2004 Bibliographic references and source identifiers for terminology work
- ISO 12616:2002 Translation-oriented terminography
- ISO 12620:2019 Management of terminology resources — Data category specifications
- ISO 12625 Tissue paper and tissue products
  - ISO 12625-1:2011 Part 1: General guidance on terms
- ISO 12637 Graphic technology - Vocabulary
  - ISO 12637-1:2006 Part 1: Fundamental terms
  - ISO 12637-2:2008 Part 2: Prepress terms
  - ISO 12637-3:2009 Part 3: Printing terms
  - ISO 12637-4:2008 Part 4: Postpress terms
- ISO 12639:2004 Graphic technology – Prepress digital data exchange – Tag image file format for image technology (TIFF/IT)
- ISO 12640 Graphic technology - Prepress digital data exchange
  - ISO 12640-1:1997 Part 1: CMYK standard colour image data (CMYK/SCID)
  - ISO 12640-2:2004 Part 2: XYZ/sRGB encoded standard colour image data (XYZ/SCID)
  - ISO 12640-3:2007 Part 3: CIELAB standard colour image data (CIELAB/SCID)
  - ISO 12640-4:2011 Part 4: Wide gamut display-referred standard colour image data [Adobe RGB (1998)/SCID]
  - ISO 12640-5:2013 Part 5: Scene-referred standard colour image data (RIMM/SCID)
- ISO 12641:1997 Graphic technology – Prepress digital data exchange – Colour targets for input scanner calibration
  - ISO 12641-1:2016 Part 1: Colour targets for input scanner calibration
- ISO 12642 Graphic technology - Input data for characterization of four-colour process printing
  - ISO 12642-1:2011 Part 1: Initial data set
  - ISO 12642-2:2006 Part 2: Expanded data set
- ISO 12651 Electronic document management - Vocabulary
  - ISO 12651-1:2012 Part 1: Electronic document imaging
  - ISO 12651-2:2014 Part 2: Workflow management
- ISO 12671:2012 Thermal spraying - Thermally sprayed coatings - Symbolic representation on drawings
- ISO 12706:2009 Non-destructive testing - Penetrant testing - Vocabulary
- ISO 12707:2016 Non-destructive testing - Magnetic particle testing - Vocabulary
- ISO 12716:2001 Non-destructive testing - Acoustic emission inspection - Vocabulary
- ISO 12718:2008 Non-destructive testing - Eddy current testing - Vocabulary
- ISO 12749 Nuclear energy, nuclear technologies, and radiological protection - Vocabulary
  - ISO 12749-2:2013 Part 2: Radiological protection
  - ISO 12749-3:2015 Part 3: Nuclear fuel cycle
  - ISO 12749-4:2015 Part 4: Dosimetry for radiation processing
- ISO 12756:2016 Drawing and writing instruments - Ball point pens and roller ball pens - Vocabulary
- ISO 12757 Ball point pens and refills
  - ISO 12757-2:1998 Part 2: Documentary use (DOC)
- ISO 12764:2017 Measurement of fluid flow in closed conduits – Flowrate measurement by means of vortex shedding flowmeters inserted in circular cross-section conduits running full
- ISO/TR 12767:2007 Measurement of fluid flow by means of pressure differential devices – Guidelines on the effect of departure from the specifications and operating conditions given in ISO 5167
- ISO/TR 12773 Business requirements for health summary records
  - ISO/TR 12773-1:2009 Part 1: Requirements
  - ISO/TR 12773-2:2009 Part 2: Environmental scan
- ISO 12780 Geometrical product specifications (GPS) - Straightness
  - ISO 12780-1:2011 Part 1: Vocabulary and parameters of straightness
  - ISO 12780-2:2011 Part 2: Specification operators
- ISO 12781 Geometrical product specifications (GPS) - Flatness
  - ISO 12781-1:2011 Part 1: Vocabulary and parameters of flatness
  - ISO 12781-2:2011 Part 2: Specification operators
- ISO/IEC 12785 Information technology - Learning, education, and training - Content packaging
  - ISO/IEC 12785-1:2009 Part 1: Information model
  - ISO/IEC 12785-2:2011 Part 2: XML binding
  - ISO/IEC TR 12785-3:2012 Part 3: Best practice and implementation guide
- ISO 12789 Reference radiation fields - Simulated workplace neutron fields
  - ISO 12789-1:2008 Part 1: Characteristics and methods of production
  - ISO 12789-2:2008 Part 2: Calibration fundamentals related to the basic quantities
- ISO/TR 12802:2010 Nanotechnologies - Model taxonomic framework for use in developing vocabularies - Core concepts
- ISO/TS 12805:2011 Nanotechnologies – Materials specifications – Guidance on specifying nano-objects
- ISO 12812 Core banking – Mobile financial services
  - ISO 12812-1:2017 Part 1: General framework
  - ISO/TS 12812-2:2017 Part 2: Security and data protection for mobile financial services
  - ISO/TS 12812-3:2017 Part 3: Financial application lifecycle management
  - ISO/TS 12812-4:2017 Part 4: Mobile payments-to-persons
  - ISO/TS 12812-5:2017 Part 5: Mobile payments to businesses
- ISO 12813:2015 Electronic fee collection – Compliance check communication for autonomous systems
- ISO 12836:2015 Dentistry - Digitizing devices for CAD/CAM systems for indirect dental restorations - Test methods for assessing accuracy
- ISO/TR 12845:2010 Selected illustrations of fractional factorial screening experiments
- ISO 12855:2015 Electronic fee collection – Information exchange between service provision and toll charging
- ISO 12858 Optics and optical instruments – Ancillary devices for geodetic instruments
  - ISO 12858-1:2014 Part 1: Invar levelling staffs
  - ISO 12858-2:1999 Part 2: Tripods
  - ISO 12858-3:2005 Part 3: Tribrachs
- ISO/TR 12859:2009 Intelligent transport systems – System architecture – Privacy aspects in ITS standards and systems
- ISO/IEC TR 12860:2009 Information technology – Telecommunications and information exchange between systems – Next Generation Corporate Networks (NGCN) – General
- ISO/IEC TR 12861:2009 Information technology – Telecommunications and information exchange between systems – Next Generation Corporate Networks (NGCN) – Identification and routing
- ISO/IEC 12862:2011 Information technology - 120 mm (8.54 GB per side) and 80 mm (2.66 GB per side) DVD recordable disk for dual layer (DVD-R for DL)
- ISO 12865:2006 Ophthalmic instruments – Retinoscopes
- ISO 12866:1999 Ophthalmic instruments – Perimeters
- ISO 12867:2010 Ophthalmic instruments – Trial frames
- ISO/TS 12869:2012 Water quality – Detection and quantification of Legionella spp. and/or Legionella pneumophila by concentration and genic amplification by quantitative polymerase chain reaction (qPCR)
- ISO 12870:2016 Ophthalmic optics – Spectacle frames – Requirements and test methods
- ISO/TR 12885:2008 Nanotechnologies – Health and safety practices in occupational settings relevant to nanotechnologies
- ISO/TR 12888:2011 Selected illustrations of gauge repeatability and reproducibility studies
- ISO 12891 Retrieval and analysis of surgical implants
  - ISO 12891-1:2015 Part 1: Retrieval and handling
  - ISO 12891-2:2014 Part 2: Analysis of retrieved surgical implants
- ISO/TS 12901 Nanotechnologies – Occupational risk management applied to engineered nanomaterials
  - ISO/TS 12901-1:2012 Part 1: Principles and approaches
  - ISO/TS 12901-2:2014 Part 2: Use of the control banding approach
- ISO/IEC 12905:2011 Integrated circuit cards – Enhanced terminal accessibility using cardholder preference interface
- ISO 12912:2014 Circular knitting machines – Vocabulary
- ISO 12913 Acoustics – Soundscape
  - ISO 12913-1:2014 Part 1: Definition and conceptual framework
- ISO 12931:2012 Performance criteria for authentication solutions used to combat counterfeiting of material goods
- ISO 12944 Paints and varnishes – Corrosion protection of steel structures by protective paint systems
- ISO 12967 Health informatics – Service architecture
  - ISO 12967-1:2009 Part 1: Enterprise viewpoint
  - ISO 12967-2:2009 Part 2: Information viewpoint
  - ISO 12967-3:2009 Part 3: Computational viewpoint
- ISO 12999 Acoustics – Determination and application of measurement uncertainties in building acoustics
  - ISO 12999-1:2014 Part 1: Sound insulation

== ISO 13000 – ISO 13999 ==
- ISO 13006:2012 Ceramic tiles – Definitions, classification, characteristics and marking
- ISO 13007 Ceramic tiles – Grouts and adhesives
  - ISO 13007-1:2014 Terms, definitions and specifications for adhesives
  - ISO 13007-2:2010 Test methods for adhesives
  - ISO 13007-3:2010 Terms, definitions and specifications for grouts
  - ISO 13007-4:2013 Test methods for grouts
- ISO 13008:2012 Information and documentation - Digital records conversion and migration process
- ISO 13009:2015 Tourism and related services – Requirements and recommendations for beach operation
- ISO/TR 13014:2012 Nanotechnologies – Guidance on physico-chemical characterization of engineered nanoscale materials for toxicologic assessment
- ISO/TR 13028:2010 Information and documentation - Implementation guidelines for digitization of records
- ISO 13053 Quantitative methods in process improvement - Lean and Six Sigma
  - ISO 13053-1:2011 Part 1: DMAIC methodology
  - ISO 13053-2:2011 Part 2: Tools and techniques
- ISO/TR 13054:2012 Knowledge management of health information standards
- ISO/TR 13062:2015 Electric mopeds and motorcycles – Terminology and classification
- ISO/IEC 13066 Information technology - Interoperability with assistive technology (AT)
  - ISO/IEC 13066-1:2011 Part 1: Requirements and recommendations for interoperability
  - ISO/IEC TR 13066-2:2016 Part 2: Windows accessibility application programming interface (API)
  - ISO/IEC TR 13066-3:2012 Part 3: IAccessible2 accessibility application programming interface (API)
  - ISO/IEC TR 13066-4:2015 Part 4: Linux/UNIX graphical environments accessibility API
  - ISO/IEC TR 13066-6:2014 Part 6: Java accessibility application programming interface (API)
- ISO 13078 Dentistry - Dental furnace
  - ISO 13078-2:2016 Part 2: Test method for evaluation of furnace programme via firing glaze
- ISO 13102:2012 Geometrical product specifications (GPS) – Dimensional measuring equipment: Electronic digital-indicator gauge – Design and metrological characteristics
- ISO 13105 Building construction machinery and equipment – Machinery for concrete surface floating and finishing
  - ISO 13105-1:2014 Part 1: Terms and commercial specifications
- ISO 13111 Intelligent transport systems (ITS) – The use of personal ITS station to support ITS service provision for travellers
  - ISO 13111-1:2017 Part 1: General information and use case definitions
- ISO 13119:2012 Health informatics – Clinical knowledge resources – Metadata
- ISO 13120:2013 Health informatics – Syntax to represent the content of healthcare classification systems – Classification Markup Language (ClaML)
- ISO/TR 13121:2011 Nanotechnologies – Nanomaterial risk evaluation
- ISO 13127:2012 Packaging - Child resistant packaging - Mechanical test methods for reclosable child resistant packaging systems
- ISO/TR 13128:2012 Health Informatics – Clinical document registry federation
- ISO/TS 13131:2014 Health informatics – Telehealth services – Quality planning guidelines
- ISO/TS 13136:2012 Microbiology of food and animal feed – Real-time polymerase chain reaction (PCR)-based method for the detection of food-borne pathogens – Horizontal method for the detection of Shiga toxin-producing Escherichia coli (STEC) and the determination of O157, O111, O26, O103 and O145 serogroups
- ISO 13140 Electronic fee collection – Evaluation of on-board and roadside equipment for conformity to ISO 13141
  - ISO 13140-1:2016 Part 1: Test suite structure and test purposes
  - ISO 13140-2:2016 Part 2: Abstract test suite
- ISO 13141:2015 Electronic fee collection – Localisation augmentation communication for autonomous systems
- ISO 13142:2015 Electro-optical systems – Cavity ring-down technique for high-reflectance measurement
- ISO 13143 Electronic fee collection – Evaluation of on-board and roadside equipment for conformity to ISO 12813
  - ISO 13143-1:2016 Part 1: Test suite structure and test purposes
  - ISO 13143-2:2016 Part 2: Abstract test suite
- ISO/TR 13154:2017 Medical electrical equipment – Deployment, implementation and operational guidelines for identifying febrile humans using a screening thermograph
- ISO/IEC 13156:2011 Information technology – Telecommunications and information exchange between systems – High rate 60 GHz PHY, MAC and PALs
- ISO/IEC 13157 Information technology – Telecommunications and information exchange between systems – NFC Security
  - ISO/IEC 13157-1:2014 Part 1: NFC-SEC NFCIP-1 security services and protocol
  - ISO/IEC 13157-2:2016 Part 2: NFC-SEC cryptography standard using ECDH and AES
  - ISO/IEC 13157-3:2016 Part 3: NFC-SEC cryptography standard using ECDH-256 and AES-GCM
  - ISO/IEC 13157-4:2016 Part 4: NFC-SEC entity authentication and key agreement using asymmetric cryptography
  - ISO/IEC 13157-5:2016 Part 5: NFC-SEC entity authentication and key agreement using symmetric cryptography
- ISO 13160:2012 Water quality - Strontium 90 and strontium 89 - Test methods using liquid scintillation counting or proportional counting
- ISO 13161:2011 Water quality - Measurement of polonium 210 activity concentration in water by alpha spectrometry
- ISO 13162:2011 Water quality - Determination of carbon 14 activity - Liquid scintillation counting method
- ISO 13163:2013 Water quality - Lead-210 - Test method using liquid scintillation counting
- ISO 13164 Water quality - Radon-222
  - ISO 13164-1:2013 Part 1: General principles
  - ISO 13164-2:2013 Part 2: Test method using gamma-ray spectrometry
  - ISO 13164-3:2013 Part 3: Test method using emanometry
  - ISO 13164-4:2015 Part 4: Test method using two-phase liquid scintillation counting
- ISO 13165 Water quality - Radium-226
  - ISO 13165-1:2013 Part 1: Test method using liquid scintillation counting
  - ISO 13165-2:2014 Part 2: Test method using emanometry
  - ISO 13165-3:2016 Part 3: Test method using coprecipitation and gamma-spectrometry
- ISO 13167:2015 Water quality - Plutonium, americium, curium and neptunium - Test method using alpha spectrometry
- ISO/IEC 13170:2009 Information technology - 120 mm (8.54 GB per side) and 80 mm (2.66 GB per side) DVD re-recordable disk for dual layer (DVD-RW for DL)
- ISO 13175 Implants for surgery – Calcium phosphates
  - ISO 13175-3:2012 Part 3: Hydroxyapatite and beta-tricalcium phosphate bone substitutes
- ISO 13179 Implants for surgery – Plasma-sprayed unalloyed titanium coatings on metallic surgical implants
  - ISO 13179-1:2014 Part 1: General requirements
- ISO 13183:2012 Intelligent transport systems – Communications access for land mobiles (CALM) – Using broadcast communications
- ISO 13184 Intelligent transport systems (ITS) – Guidance protocol via personal ITS station for advisory safety systems
  - ISO/TR 13184-1:2013 Part 1: General information and use case definitions
  - ISO 13184-2:2016 Part 2: Road guidance protocol (RGP) requirements and specification
- ISO 13185 Intelligent transport systems – Vehicle interface for provisioning and support of ITS services
  - ISO/TR 13185-1:2012 Part 1: General information and use case definition
  - ISO 13185-2:2015 Part 2: Unified gateway protocol (UGP) requirements and specification for vehicle ITS station gateway (V-ITS-SG) interface
- ISO/IEC 13187:2011 Information technology - Server management command line protocol (SM CLP) specification
- ISO/TR 13195:2015 Selected illustrations of response surface method - Central composite design
- ISO 13200:1995 Cranes - Safety signs and hazard pictorials - General principles
- ISO 13203:2005 Chains, sprockets and accessories - List of equivalent terms
- ISO/IEC 13210:1999 Information technology - Requirements and Guidelines for Test Methods Specifications and Test Method Implementations for Measuring Conformance to POSIX Standards
- ISO/IEC 13211 Information technology - Programming languages - Prolog
  - ISO/IEC 13211-1:1995 Part 1: General core
  - ISO/IEC 13211-2:2000 Part 2: Modules
- ISO 13212:2014 Ophthalmic optics – Contact lens care products – Guidelines for determination of shelf-life
- ISO/IEC 13213:1994 Information technology - Microprocessor systems - Control and Status Registers (CSR) Architecture for microcomputer buses
- ISO 13225:2012 Geometrical product specifications (GPS) – Dimensional measuring equipment; Height gauges – Design and metrological characteristics
- ISO/IEC TR 13233:1995 Information technology - Interpretation of accreditation requirements in ISO/IEC Guide 25 - Accreditation of Information Technology and Telecommunications testing laboratories for software and protocol testing services
- ISO/IEC 13235 Information technology - Open Distributed Processing - Trading function
  - ISO/IEC 13235-1:1998 Specification
  - ISO/IEC 13235-3:1998 Part 3: Provision of Trading Function using OSI Directory service
- ISO/IEC 13236:1998 Information technology - Quality of service: Framework
- ISO/IEC 13238 Information technology – Data Management
  - ISO/IEC 13238-3:1998 Part 3: IRDS export/import facility
- ISO/IEC 13239:2002 Information technology – Telecommunications and information exchange between systems – High-level data link control (HDLC) procedures
- ISO/IEC 13240:2001 Information technology - Document description and processing languages - Interchange Standard for Multimedia Interactive Documents (ISMID)
- ISO/IEC 13241:1997 Information technology – Telecommunications and information exchange between systems – Private Integrated Services Network – Inter-exchange signalling protocol – Route Restriction Class additional network feature
- ISO/IEC 13242:1997 Information technology – Telecommunications and information exchange between systems – Private Integrated Services Network – Specification, functional model and information flows – Route Restriction Class additional network feature
- ISO/IEC 13244:1998 Information technology - Open Distributed Management Architecture
- ISO/IEC 13246:1997 Information technology – Telecommunications and information exchange between systems – Broadband Private Integrated Services Network – Inter-exchange signalling protocol – Signalling ATM adaptation layer
- ISO/IEC 13247:1997 Information technology – Telecommunications and information exchange between systems – Broadband Private Integrated Services Network – Inter-exchange signalling protocol – Basic call/connection control
- ISO/IEC 13249 Information technology – Database languages – SQL multimedia and application
  - ISO/IEC 13249-1:2016 Part 1: Framework
  - ISO/IEC 13249-2:2003 Part 2: Full-Text
  - ISO/IEC 13249-3:2016 Part 3: Spatial
  - ISO/IEC 13249-5:2003 Part 5: Still image
  - ISO/IEC 13249-6:2006 Part 6: Data mining
  - ISO/IEC TS 13249-7:2013 Part 7: History
- ISO/IEC 13250 Information technology – Topic Maps (Note: The exact wording of this title varies between parts. This is the wording of the most recently published part.)
- ISO/IEC 13251:2004 Collection of graphical symbols for office equipment
- ISO/IEC 13252:1999 Information technology – Enhanced communications transport service definition
- ISO 13261 Sound power rating of air-conditioning and air source heat pump equipment
  - ISO 13261-1:1998 Part 1: Non-ducted outdoor equipment
  - ISO 13261-2:1998 Part 2: Non-ducted indoor equipment
- ISO 13274:2013 Packaging - Transport packaging for dangerous goods - Plastics compatibility testing for packaging and IBCs
- ISO/TS 13278:2011 Nanotechnologies – Determination of elemental impurities in samples of carbon nanotubes using inductively coupled plasma mass spectrometry
- ISO 13289:2011 Recreational diving services – Requirements for the conduct of snorkelling excursions
- ISO 13293:2012 Recreational diving services – Requirements for gas blender training programmes
- ISO 13300 Sensory analysis – General guidance for the staff of a sensory evaluation laboratory
  - ISO 13300-1:2006 Part 1: Staff responsibilities
  - ISO 13300-2:2006 Part 2: Recruitment and training of panel leaders
- ISO 13304 Radiological protection - Minimum criteria for electron paramagnetic resonance (EPR) spectroscopy for retrospective dosimetry of ionizing radiation
  - ISO 13304-1:2013 Part 1: General principles
- ISO 13307:2013 Microbiology of food and animal feed – Primary production stage – Sampling techniques
- ISO 13320:2009 Particle size analysis - Laser diffraction methods
- ISO 13325:2003 Tyres – Coast-by methods for measurement of tyre-to-road sound emission
- ISO/TR 13329:2012 Nanomaterials – Preparation of material safety data sheet (MSDS)
- ISO 13332:2000 Reciprocating internal combustion engines – Test code for the measurement of structure-borne noise emitted from high-speed and medium-speed reciprocating internal combustion engines measured at the engine feet
- ISO/IEC 13346 Information technology – Volume and file structure of write-once and rewritable media using non-sequential recording for information interchange
  - ISO/IEC 13346-1:1995 Part 1: General
  - ISO/IEC 13346-2:1999 Part 2: Volume and boot block recognition
  - ISO/IEC 13346-3:1999 Part 3: Volume structure
  - ISO/IEC 13346-4:1999 Part 4: File structure
  - ISO/IEC 13346-5:1995 Part 5: Record structure
- ISO 13347 Industrial fans – Determination of fan sound power levels under standardized laboratory conditions
  - ISO 13347-1:2004 Part 1: General overview
  - ISO 13347-2:2004 Part 2: Reverberant room method
  - ISO 13347-3:2004 Part 3: Enveloping surface methods
  - ISO 13347-4:2004 Part 4: Sound intensity method
- ISO 13349:2010 Fans - Vocabulary and definitions of categories
- ISO 13356:2015 Implants for surgery – Ceramic materials based on yttria-stabilized tetragonal zirconia (Y-TZP)
- ISO 13370 Thermal performance of buildings – Heat transfer via the ground – Calculation methods
- ISO 13372:2012 Condition monitoring and diagnostics of machines - Vocabulary
- ISO 13373 Condition monitoring and diagnostics of machines – Vibration condition monitoring
  - ISO 13373-1:2002 Part 1: General procedures
  - ISO 13373-2:2016 Part 2: Processing, analysis and presentation of vibration data
  - ISO 13373-3:2015 Part 3: Guidelines for vibration diagnosis
  - ISO 13373-7:2017 Part 7: Diagnostic techniques for machine sets in hydraulic power generating and pump-storage plants
  - ISO 13373-9:2017 Part 9: Diagnostic techniques for electric motors
- ISO 13374 Condition monitoring and diagnostics of machine systems – Data processing, communication and presentation
  - ISO 13374-1:2003 Part 1: General guidelines
  - ISO 13374-2:2007 Part 2: Data processing
  - ISO 13374-3:2012 Part 3: Communication
  - ISO 13374-4:2015 Part 4: Presentation
- ISO 13379 Condition monitoring and diagnostics of machines – Data interpretation and diagnostics techniques
  - ISO 13379-1:2012 Part 1: General guidelines
  - ISO 13379-2:2015 Part 2: Data-driven applications
- ISO 13381 Condition monitoring and diagnostics of machines – Prognostics
  - ISO 13381-1:2015 Part 1: General guidelines
- ISO 13385 Geometrical product specifications (GPS) – Dimensional measuring equipment
  - ISO 13385-1:2011 Part 1: Callipers; Design and metrological characteristics
  - ISO 13385-2:2011 Part 2: Calliper depth gauges; Design and metrological characteristics
- ISO 13399 Cutting tool data representation and exchange
  - ISO 13399-1:2006 Part 1: Overview, fundamental principles and general information model
  - ISO/TS 13399-2:2014 Part 2: Reference dictionary for the cutting items
  - ISO/TS 13399-3:2014 Part 3: Reference dictionary for tool items
  - ISO/TS 13399-4:2014 Part 4: Reference dictionary for adaptive items
  - ISO/TS 13399-5:2014 Part 5: Reference dictionary for assembly items
  - ISO/TS 13399-50:2013 Part 50: Reference dictionary for reference systems and common concepts
  - ISO/TS 13399-60:2014 Part 60: Reference dictionary for connection systems
  - ISO/TS 13399-70:2016 Part 70: Graphical data layout - Layer setting for tool layout
  - ISO/TS 13399-71:2016 Part 71: Graphical data layout - Creation of documents for standardized data exchange: Graphical product information
  - ISO/TS 13399-72:2016 Part 72: Creation of documents for the standardized data exchange - Definition of properties for drawing header and their XML-data exchange
  - ISO/TS 13399-80:2017 Part 80: Creation and exchange of 3D models - Overview and principles
  - ISO/TS 13399-100:2008 Part 100: Definitions, principles and methods for reference dictionaries
  - ISO/TS 13399-150:2008 Part 150: Usage guidelines
  - ISO/TS 13399-201:2014 Part 201: Creation and exchange of 3D models - Regular inserts
  - ISO/TS 13399-202:2015 Part 202: Creation and exchange of 3D models - Irregular inserts
  - ISO/TS 13399-203:2015 Part 203: Creation and exchange of 3D models - Replaceable inserts for drilling
  - ISO/TS 13399-204:2016 Part 204: Creation and exchange of 3D models - Inserts for reaming
  - ISO/TS 13399-301:2013 Part 301: Concept for the design of 3D models based on properties according to ISO/TS 13399-3: Modelling of thread-cutting taps, thread-forming taps and thread-cutting dies
  - ISO/TS 13399-302:2013 Part 302: Concept for the design of 3D models based on properties according to ISO/TS 13399-3: Modelling of solid drills and countersinking tools
  - ISO/TS 13399-303:2016 Part 303: Creation and exchange of 3D models - Solid end mills
  - ISO/TS 13399-304:2016 Part 304: Creation and exchange of 3D models - Solid milling cutters with arbor hole
  - ISO/TS 13399-305:2017 Part 305: Creation and exchange of 3D models - Modular tooling systems with adjustable cartridges for boring
  - ISO/TS 13399-307:2016 Part 307: Creation and exchange of 3D models - End mills for indexable inserts
  - ISO/TS 13399-308:2016 Part 308: Creation and exchange of 3D models - Milling cutters with arbor hole for indexable inserts
  - ISO/TS 13399-309:2016 Part 309: Creation and exchange of 3D models - Tool holders for indexable inserts
  - ISO/TS 13399-310:2017 Part 310: Creation and exchange of 3D models - Turning tools with carbide tips
  - ISO/TS 13399-311:2016 Part 311: Creation and exchange of 3D models - Solid reamers
  - ISO/TS 13399-312:2016 Part 312: Creation and exchange of 3D models - Reamers for indexable inserts
  - ISO/TS 13399-401:2016 Part 401: Creation and exchange of 3D models - Converting, extending and reducing adaptive items
  - ISO/TS 13399-405:2016 Part 405: Creation and exchange of 3D models - Collets
- ISO 13402:1995 Surgical and dental hand instruments – Determination of resistance against autoclaving, corrosion and thermal exposure
- ISO/IEC 13403:1995 Information technology - Information interchange on 300 mm optical disk cartridges of the write once, read multiple (WORM) type using the CCS method
- ISO 13404:2007 Prosthetics and orthotics – Categorization and description of external orthoses and orthotic components
- ISO 13405 Prosthetics and orthotics – Classification and description of prosthetic components
  - ISO 13405-1:2015 Part 1: Classification of prosthetic components
  - ISO 13405-2:2015 Part 2: Description of lower limb prosthetic components
  - ISO 13405-3:2015 Part 3: Description of upper limb prosthetic components
- ISO 13406 Ergonomic requirements for work with visual displays based on flat panels
  - ISO 13406-2:2001 Part 2: Ergonomic requirements for flat panel displays [withdrawn 2008-11-14]
- ISO 13407:1999 Human-centred design processes for interactive systems (This standard has been revised by ISO 9241-210:2010)
- ISO/IEC 13421:1993 Information technology – Data Interchange on 12.7 mm, 48-track magnetic tape cartridges – DLT 1 format
- ISO/IEC 13422:1994 Information technology – Data interchange on 90 mm Flexible Disk Cartridges 10 MB capacity using sector servo tracking – ISO Type 304
- ISO 13444:2012 Technical product documentation (TPD) – Dimensioning and indication of knurling
- ISO 13448 Acceptance sampling procedures based on the allocation of priorities principle (APP)
  - ISO 13448-1:2005 Part 1: Guidelines for the APP approach
  - ISO 13448-2:2004 Part 2: Coordinated single sampling plans for acceptance sampling by attributes
- ISO 13450 Photography – 110-size cartridge, film and backing paper – Dimensions
- ISO/TS 13471 Acoustics – Temperature influence on tyre/road noise measurement
  - ISO/TS 13471-1:2017 Part 1: Correction for temperature when testing with the CPX method
- ISO 13472 Acoustics – Measurement of sound absorption properties of road surfaces in situ
  - ISO 13472-1:2002 Part 1: Extended surface method
  - ISO 13472-2:2010 Part 2: Spot method for reflective surfaces
- ISO 13473 Characterization of pavement texture by use of surface profiles
  - ISO 13473-1:1997 Part 1: Determination of Mean Profile Depth
  - ISO 13473-2:2002 Part 2: Terminology and basic requirements related to pavement texture profile analysis
  - ISO 13473-3:2002 Part 3: Specification and classification of profilometers
  - ISO/TS 13473-4:2008 Part 4: Spectral analysis of surface profiles
  - ISO 13473-5:2009 Part 5: Determination of megatexture
- ISO 13474:2009 Acoustics – Framework for calculating a distribution of sound exposure levels for impulsive sound events for the purposes of environmental noise assessment
- ISO 13475 Acoustics – Stationary audible warning devices used outdoors
  - ISO 13475-1:1999 Part 1: Field measurements for determination of sound emission quantities
  - ISO/TS 13475-2:2000 Part 2: Precision methods for determination of sound emission quantities
- ISO/IEC 13481:1993 Information technology - Data interchange on 130 mm optical disk cartridges - Capacity: 1 GB per cartridge
- ISO 13482:2014 Robots and robotic devices – Safety requirements for personal care robots
- ISO 13485:2016 Medical devices – Quality management systems – Requirements for regulatory purposes
- ISO/IEC 13490 Information technology – Volume and file structure of read-only and write-once compact disk media for information interchange
  - ISO/IEC 13490-1:1995 Part 1: General
  - ISO/IEC 13490-2:1995 Part 2: Volume and file structure
- ISO 13491 Financial services – Secure cryptographic devices (retail)
  - ISO 13491-1:2016 Part 1: Concepts, requirements and evaluation methods
  - ISO 13491-2:2017 Part 2: Security compliance checklists for devices used in financial transactions
- ISO 13492:2007 Financial services – Key management related data element – Application and usage of ISO 8583 data elements 53 and 96
- ISO/TR 13519:2012 Guidance on the development and use of ISO statistical publications supported by software
- ISO/IEC 13522 Information technology - Coding of multimedia and hypermedia information
  - ISO/IEC 13522-1:1997 Part 1: MHEG object representation - Base notation (ASN.1)
  - ISO/IEC 13522-3:1997 Part 3: MHEG script interchange representation
  - ISO/IEC 13522-4:1996 Part 4: MHEG registration procedure
  - ISO/IEC 13522-5:1997 Part 5: Support for base-level interactive applications
  - ISO/IEC 13522-6:1998 Part 6: Support for enhanced interactive applications
  - ISO/IEC 13522-7:2001 Part 7: Interoperability and conformance testing for ISO/IEC 13522-5
  - ISO/IEC 13522-8:2001 Part 8: XML notation for ISO/IEC 13522-5
- ISO 13528:2015 Statistical methods for use in proficiency testing by interlaboratory comparison
- ISO 13539:1998 Earth-moving machinery – Trenchers – Definitions and commercial specifications
- ISO/IEC 13549:1993 Information technology - Data interchange on 130 mm optical disk cartridges - Capacity: 1.3 GB per cartridge
- ISO 13550:2002 Hydrometric determinations – Flow measurements in open channels using structures – Use of vertical underflow gates and radial gates
- ISO 13559:2002 Butter, fermented milks and fresh cheese – Enumeration of contaminating microorganisms – Colony-count technique at 30 degrees C
- ISO/IEC 13560:2009 Information technology – Telecommunications and information exchange between systems – Procedure for the registration of assigned numbers for ISO/IEC 26907 and ISO/IEC 26908
- ISO/IEC TR 13561:1994 Information technology - Guidelines for effective use of optical disk cartridges conforming to ISO/IEC 10090
- ISO 13565 Geometrical Product Specifications (GPS) - Surface texture: Profile method; Surfaces having stratified functional properties
  - ISO 13565-1:1996 Part 1: Filtering and general measurement conditions
  - ISO 13565-2:1996 Part 2: Height characterization using the linear material ratio curve
  - ISO 13565-3:1998 Part 3: Height characterization using the material probability curve
- ISO 13567 Technical product documentation – Organization and naming of layers for CAD
- ISO/IEC 13568:2002 Information Technology – Z formal specification notation – Syntax, type system and semantics
- ISO/TR 13569:2005 Financial services – Information security guidelines
- ISO 13574:2015 Industrial furnaces and associated processing equipment - Vocabulary
- ISO/IEC 13575:1995 Information technology – Telecommunications and information exchange between systems – 50-pole interface connector mateability dimensions and contact number assignments
- ISO 13577 Industrial furnaces and associated processing equipment - Safety
  - ISO 13577-1:2016 Part 1: General requirements
  - ISO 13577-2:2014 Part 2: Combustion and fuel handling systems
  - ISO 13577-3:2016 Part 3: Generation and use of protective and reactive atmosphere gases
  - ISO 13577-4:2014 Part 4: Protective systems
- ISO 13579 Industrial furnaces and associated processing equipment - Method of measuring energy balance and calculating efficiency
  - ISO 13579-1:2013 General methodology
  - ISO 13579-2:2013 Reheating furnaces for steel
  - ISO 13579-3:2013 Batch-type aluminium melting furnaces
  - ISO 13579-4:2013 Furnaces with protective or reactive atmosphere
- ISO/TS 13582:2015 Health informatics – Sharing of OID registry information
- ISO 13586:2000 Plastics - Determination of fracture toughness (GIC and KIC) – Linear elastic fracture mechanics (LEFM) approach
- ISO/TR 13587:2012 Three statistical approaches for the assessment and interpretation of measurement uncertainty
- ISO/IEC TR 13594:1995 Information technology – Lower layers security
- ISO 13606 Health informatics – Electronic health record communication
  - ISO 13606-1:2008 Part 1: Reference model
  - ISO 13606-2:2008 Part 2: Archetype interchange specification
  - ISO 13606-3:2009 Part 3: Reference archetypes and term lists
  - ISO/TS 13606-4:2009 Part 4: Security
  - ISO 13606-5:2010 Part 5: Interface specification
- ISO 13611:2014 Interpreting - Guidelines for community interpreting
- ISO/IEC 13614:1995 Information technology - Interchange on 300 mm optical disk cartridges of the write once, read multiple (WORM) type using the SSF method
- ISO 13616 Financial services – International bank account number (IBAN)
- ISO 13628 Petroleum and natural gas industries – Design and operation of subsea production systems
  - ISO 13628-1:2005 Part 1: General requirements and recommendations
  - ISO 13628-2:2006 Part 2: Unbonded flexible pipe systems for subsea and marine applications
  - ISO 13628-3:2000 Part 3: Through flowline (TFL) systems
  - ISO 13628-4:2010 Part 4: Subsea wellhead and tree equipment
  - ISO 13628-5:2009 Part 5: Subsea umbilicals
  - ISO 13628-6:2006 Part 6: Subsea production control systems
  - ISO 13628-7:2005 Part 7: Completion/workover riser systems
  - ISO 13628-8:2002 Part 8: Remotely Operated Vehicle (ROV) interfaces on subsea production systems
  - ISO 13628-9:2000 Part 9: Remotely Operated Tool (ROT) intervention systems
  - ISO 13628-10:2005 Part 10: Specification for bonded flexible pipe
  - ISO 13628-11:2007 Part 11: Flexible pipe systems for subsea and marine applications
  - ISO 13628-15:2011 Part 15: Subsea structures and manifolds
- ISO/IEC 13642:1999 Information technology – Elements of management information related to the OSI Physical Layer
- ISO 13653:1996 Optics and optical instruments - General optical test methods - Measurement of relative irradiance in the image field
- ISO 13666:2012 Ophthalmic optics - Spectacle lenses - Vocabulary
- ISO/IEC 13673:2000 Information technology - Document processing and related communication - Conformance testing for Standard Generalized Markup Language (SGML) systems
- ISO 13687 Tourism and related services – Yacht harbours
  - ISO 13687-1:2017 Part 1: Minimum requirements for basic service level harbours
  - ISO 13687-2:2017 Part 2: Minimum requirements for intermediate service level harbours
  - ISO 13687-3:2017 Part 3: Minimum requirements for high service level harbours
- ISO 13694:2015 Optics and photonics – Lasers and laser-related equipment – Test methods for laser beam power (energy) density distribution
- ISO 13695:2004 Optics and photonics – Lasers and laser-related equipment – Test methods for the spectral characteristics of lasers
- ISO 13696:2002 Optics and optical instruments – Test methods for radiation scattered by optical components
- ISO 13697:2006 Optics and photonics – Lasers and laser-related equipment – Test methods for specular reflectance and regular transmittance of optical laser components
- ISO 13702 Petroleum and natural gas industries - Control and mitigation of fires and explosions on offshore production installations - Requirements and guidelines
- ISO/IEC 13712 Information technology – Remote Operations
  - ISO/IEC 13712-1:1995 Concepts, model and notation
  - ISO/IEC 13712-2:1995 OSI realizations – Remote Operations Service Element (ROSE) service definition
  - ISO/IEC 13712-3:1995 OSI realizations – Remote Operations Service Element (ROSE) protocol specification
- ISO/IEC 13714:1995 Information technology – Document processing and related communication – User interface to telephone-based services – Voice messaging applications
- ISO 13715:2017 Technical product documentation—Edges of undefined shape—Indication and dimensioning
- ISO 13716:1999 Dentistry — Reversible-irreversible hydrocolloid impression material systems [Withdrawn: replaced with ISO 21563]
- ISO/IEC 13719 Information technology - Portable Common Tool Environment (PCTE)
  - ISO/IEC 13719-1:1998 Part 1: Abstract specification
  - ISO/IEC 13719-2:1998 Part 2: C programming language binding
  - ISO/IEC 13719-3:1998 Part 3: Part 3: Ada programming language binding
  - ISO/IEC 13719-4:1998 Part 4: IDL binding (Interface Definition Language)
- ISO 13720:2010 Meat and meat products – Enumeration of presumptive Pseudomonas spp.
- ISO 13722:2017 Microbiology of the food chain – Enumeration of Brochothrix spp. – Colony-count technique
- ISO 13731:2001 Ergonomics of the thermal environment - Vocabulary and symbols
- ISO 13732 Ergonomics of the thermal environment – Methods for the assessment of human responses to contact with surfaces
  - ISO 13732-1:2006 Part 1: Hot surfaces
  - ISO/TS 13732-2:2001 Part 2: Human contact with surfaces at moderate temperature
- ISO/IEC 13751:2001 Information technology - Programming languages, their environments and system software interfaces - Programming language Extended APL
- ISO 13766:2006 Earth-moving machinery – Electromagnetic compatibility
- ISO 13779 Implants for surgery – Hydroxyapatite
  - ISO 13779-2:2008 Part 2: Coatings of hydroxyapatite
  - ISO 13779-3:2008 Part 3: Chemical analysis and characterization of crystallinity and phase purity
  - ISO 13779-4:2002 Part 4: Determination of coating adhesion strength
  - ISO 13779-6:2015 Part 6: Powders
- ISO 13781:2017 Implants for surgery – Homopolymers, copolymers and blends on poly(lactide) – In vitro degradation testing
- ISO 13782:1996 Implants for surgery – Metallic materials – Unalloyed tantalum for surgical implant applications
- ISO/IEC 13800:1996 Information technology - Procedure for the registration of identifiers and attributes for volume and file structure
- ISO 13810:2015 Tourism services – Industrial tourism – Service provision
- ISO/TS 13811:2015 Tourism and related services – Guidelines on developing environmental specifications for accommodation establishments
- ISO/IEC 13816:2007 Information technology - Programming languages, their environments and system software interfaces - Programming language ISLISP
- ISO/IEC 13817 Information technology - Programming languages, their environments and system software interfaces - Vienna Development Method - Specification Language
  - ISO/IEC 13817-1:1996 Part 1: Base language
- ISO/IEC 13818 Information technology – Generic coding of moving pictures and associated audio information
- ISO/TS 13830:2013 Nanotechnologies – Guidance on voluntary labelling for consumer products containing manufactured nano-objects
- ISO 13837 Road vehicles – Safety glazing materials – Method for the determination of solar transmittance
- ISO/IEC TR 13841:1995 Information technology - Guidance on measurement techniques for 90 mm optical disk cartridges
- ISO/IEC 13842:1995 Information technology - 130 mm optical disk cartridges for information interchange - Capacity: 2 GB per cartridge
- ISO 13843:2017 Water quality – Requirements for establishing performance characteristics of quantitative microbiological methods
- ISO 13849 Safety of machinery – Safety related parts of control systems
- ISO 13850:2015 Safety of machinery – Emergency stop function – Principles for design
- ISO 13854:2017 Safety of machinery – Minimum gaps to avoid crushing of parts of the human body
- ISO 13855:2010 Safety of machinery – Positioning of safeguards with respect to the approach speeds of parts of the human body
- ISO 13860:2016 Machinery for forestry – Forwarders – Terms, definitions and commercial specifications
- ISO 13861:2000 Machinery for forestry – Wheeled skidders – Terms, definitions and commercial specifications
- ISO 13862:2000 Machinery for forestry – Feller-bunchers – Terms, definitions and commercial specifications
- ISO/IEC 13863:1998 Information technology – Telecommunications and information exchange between systems – Private Integrated Services Network – Specification, functional model and information flows – Path replacement additional network feature
- ISO/IEC 13864:1995 Information technology – Telecommunications and information exchange between systems – Private Integrated Services Network – Specification, functional model and information flows – Name identification supplementary services
- ISO/IEC 13865:2003 Information technology – Telecommunications and information exchange between systems – Private Integrated Services Network – Specification, functional model and information flows – Call Transfer supplementary service
- ISO/IEC 13866:1995 Information technology – Telecommunications and information exchange between systems – Private Integrated Services Network – Specification, functional model and information flows – Call completion supplementary services
- ISO/IEC 13868:2003 Information technology – Telecommunications and information exchange between systems – Private Integrated Services Network – Inter-exchange signalling protocol – Name identification supplementary services
- ISO/IEC 13869:2003 Information technology – Telecommunications and information exchange between systems – Private Integrated Services Network – Inter-exchange signalling protocol – Call Transfer supplementary service
- ISO/IEC 13870:2003 Information technology – Telecommunications and information exchange between systems – Private Integrated Services Network – Inter-exchange signalling protocol – Call Completion supplementary services
- ISO/IEC 13871:1995 Information technology – Telecommunications and information exchange between systems – Private telecommunications networks – Digital channel aggregation
- ISO/IEC 13872:2003 Information technology – Telecommunications and information exchange between systems – Private Integrated Services Network – Specification, functional model and information flows – Call Diversion supplementary services
- ISO/IEC 13873:2003 Information technology – Telecommunications and information exchange between systems – Private Integrated Services Network – Inter-exchange signalling protocol – Call Diversion supplementary services
- ISO/IEC 13874:2003 Information technology – Telecommunications and information exchange between systems – Private Integrated Services Network – Inter-exchange signalling protocol – Path Replacement additional network feature
- ISO/IEC 13886:1996 Information technology - Language-Independent Procedure Calling (LIPC)
- ISO/IEC 13888 Information technology - Security techniques - Non-repudiation
  - ISO/IEC 13888-1:2009 Part 1: General
  - ISO/IEC 13888-2:2010 Part 2: Mechanisms using symmetric
  - ISO/IEC 13888-3:2009 Part 3: Mechanisms using asymmetric techniques
- ISO 13920:1996 Welding – General tolerances for welded constructions – Dimensions for lengths and angles – Shape and position
- ISO/IEC 13923:1996 Information technology – 3.81 mm wide magnetic tape cartridge for information interchange – Helical scan recording – DDS-2 format using 120 m length tape
- ISO 13926 Pen systems
  - ISO 13926-1:2004 Part 1: Glass cylinders for pen-injectors for medical use
  - ISO 13926-2:2011 Part 2: Plunger stoppers for pen-injectors for medical use
  - ISO 13926-3:2012 Part 3: Seals for pen-injectors for medical use
- ISO 13940:2015 Health informatics – System of concepts to support continuity of care
- ISO 13943:2017 Fire safety - Vocabulary
- ISO 13958:2014 Concentrates for haemodialysis and related therapies
- ISO 13959:2014 Water for haemodialysis and related therapies
- ISO 13960:2010 Cardiovascular implants and extracorporeal systems – Plasmafilters
- ISO/IEC 13961:2000 Information technology - Scalable Coherent Interface (SCI)
- ISO/IEC 13962:1995 Information technology – Data interchange on 12.7 mm, 112-track magnetic tape cartridges – DLT 2 format
- ISO/IEC 13963:1995 Information technology - Data interchange on 90 mm optical disk cartridges - Capacity: 230 MB per cartridge
- ISO 13969:2003 Milk and milk products – Guidelines for a standardized description of microbial inhibitor tests
- ISO 13970:2011 Recreational diving services – Requirements for the training of recreational snorkelling guides
- ISO/TS 13972:2015 Health informatics – Detailed clinical models, characteristics and processes
- ISO/TR 13973:2014 Artificial recharge to groundwater
- ISO 13990 Textile machinery and accessories – Yarn feeders and yarn control for knitting machines
  - ISO 13990-1:2006 Part 1: Vocabulary
