= CAD standards =

Guidelines for the appearance of computer-aided design drawings

CAD standards are a set of guidelines for the appearance of computer-aided design (CAD) drawings and for how CAD data is organized, most prominently in architecture and engineering. The standards are intended to improve productivity and to facilitate the interchange of information between different organizations and computer platforms.

In education, CAD standards may refer to skill requirements to be met for an individual's certification in CAD.

== Background ==
"Architects must love CAD standards, because we have so many of them."

–Architectural Record magazine, 2002

Computer-aided design (CAD) made its first appearance in the mid-1960s and brought rapid technological change to the drafting and design professions. CAD systems evolved alongside developments in computer hardware and software, resulting in a wide range of CAD products by the 1980s. Multiple, overlapping CAD standards resulted from the need to address different issues in organization, appearance, and sharing of CAD files.

In the United States, the American Institute of Architects (AIA) introduced its popular CAD Layer Guidelines in 1990. The National CAD Standard (NCS) was released in 1999, developed by the National Institute of Building Sciences (NIBS) for 2D CAD organization. This brought together independent standards of the AIA, the Construction Specifications Institute, and the US Department of Defense Tri-Services CAD plotting standards. In data standardization, the International Alliance for Interoperability (now BuildingSMART) was founded in 1995, with some 600 software firms as members. This organization developed and released a number of open-data object-oriented data sets (Industry Foundation Classes) which were adopted by software companies. Compliant software could share data, allowing, for example, spatial planning data from a spreadsheet to be used by other programs to generate a floorplan, a 3D CAD model, or a building cost estimate.

More specific CAD standards are often set among organizations, such as a manufacturing company and its suppliers, to ensure efficiency and accuracy.

== Architecture standards ==
=== CAD layer standards ===
Most common:

- National CAD Standard (NCS), a US standard which combines:
  - AIA CAD Layer Guidelines, 2nd edition (1997)
  - Construction Specifications Institute's (CSI) Uniform Drawing System (UDS)
  - Department of Defense's Tri-Services CAD Center's plotting Standards.
- Architecture/Engineering/Construction CAD Standard, used for standardization across US Department of Defense facilities.
- BS 1192, which relies heavily on the UK Code of Procedure for the Construction Industry
  - AEC (UK), an adaptation of BS-1192 based on Uniclass.
- ISO 13567-1/3, International standard, commonly used in Northern Europe;
  - SIA 2014 (1996), Swiss standard for engineers and architects, based on ISO 13567.
  - ÖNORM A 6240-4 (2012), Austrian standard for digital documentation in technical drawings, based on ISO 13567.

Samples of standardized layers:

A-B374--E- (ISO13567: agent Architect, element Roof window in SfB, presentation graphic element);
A-37420-T2N01B113B23pro (ISO13567: agent Architect, element Roof Window in SfB, presentation Text#2, New part, floor 01, block B1, phase 1, projection 3D, scale 1:5(B), work package 23 and user definition "pro");
A-G25---D-R (ISO13567: agent Architect, element wall in Uniclass, presentation dimensions, status Existing to be removed);
A-G251-G-WallExtl-Fwd (AEC(UK): agent Architect, element External Wall in Uniclass, presentation graphic element, user definition "WallExtl" and view Forward);
A210_M_ExtWall (BS1192: agent Architect, element External Wall in SfB, presentation model, user definition "ExtWall");
A-E04---E- (ISO13567 SIA 2014: agent Architect, element Stair in SIA classification, presentation graphic element);
A-WALL-FULL (AIA: agent Architect, element Wall, Full height).

=== Line-thickness ===
Thickness for pens and plot: 0.13 mm Gray, 0.18 mm Red, 0.25 mm White, 0.35 mm Yellow, 0.50 mm Magenta, 0.70 mm Blue, 1.00 mm Green. In AutoCAD usually parts to be printed in black are drawn in 1 to 7 basic colors. Color layer: Green-Center, Magenta-Measure of length, and Blue-Hidden.

| Description | Line thickness in mm | Color Codes |
|---|---|---|
| Outline | 0.20 or 0.25 | White, Cyan, Yellow, Blue |
| Hidden Line | 0.00 or 0.05 | Blue, Gray, 241 |
| Center Line | 0.10 or 0.15 | Green, Red, Blue |
| Note | 0.18 or 0.20 | White, Cyan, Green, 41 |
| Thin Line | 0.00 or 0.05 | Gray, 08, 111 |
| Reference Line | 0.000 | Magenta, Gray |
| Hatch Line | 0.000 | Magenta, Green, Gray, red |
| Color-9 to 256 | 0.000 | |
| Dimension line | | |
| Leader Line with Arrows | 0.000 | Gray Color-9, or 8, Red |
| Text | 0.18 or 0.20 | Cyan, Green |

=== Text and dimension ===
Heights: 2.5 mm, 3.5 mm, 5.0 mm, 7.0 mm (stroke thickness (lineweight) should be 0.1 of the character height). Font styles: "Romans.shx – Romantic Simplex", "ISOCPEUR.ttf". Exceptional use of screen fonts (arial, Times New Roman etc.).

=== Scales ===
- 2:1, 20:1, 200:1 ...
- 1:1, 1:10, 1:100 ...
- 3/16 in = 1 ft
- 1/4 in = 1 ft
- 3/8 in = 1 ft
- 1/2 in = 1 ft
- 3/4 in = 1 ft
- 1 in = 1 ft
- 1 1/2 in = 1 ft
- 3 in = 1 ft (QUARTER SCALE)
- 6 in = 1 ft (HALF SCALE)
- 1 ft = 1 ft (FULL SCALE)

=== File naming standards ===
- BS 1192: Discipline (1 char), Element (2 char, using SfB Table 1 or Uniclass), Drawing type (1 char, P=preliminary, X=special/xref, L=layout, C=component, S=schedules, A=assembly drawings, K=co-ordination drawing), Unique number (3 char), Revision (1 char, A=emission, B,C,D...= revisions).

Samples: A22P012G.dwg (architect, internal walls in SfB, preliminary design, sheet 012, revision G).

- AIA
- AEC

Samples: ZE1G-124.dwg, XE1G-100.dwg

- AEC (UK): Project (unlimited char), Discipline (2 char max, recommended mandatory), Zone (optional), View (1 char, rec.mand.), Level (2 char, rec.mand.), Content (rec.mand.), Sequential number (up to 3 char);

Samples: 1234-A-Off-P-M1-Furn-11c.dwg (project #1234, architect, office zone, plan, mezzanine 1, furnitures, version 1.1 revision c), A-P-01-Part (architect, plan, 1st floor, partitions), 1234-A-S-055.dgn (project #1234, architect, section, sheet 055), A-S-xx-AA.dwg (architect, section, full building, section AA), A-P-x-Grid.dgn (architect, plan, all floor, grid), 1838-S-C-P-03 (project 1838, structures, building C, plan, 3rd floor).

- Other local: Job number (4 char), Agent (1 char), Section (4 char), phase (1 char), sheet number (2 char), revision (2 char).

Samples: 0512-A-00A_-1-01-02.dwg Job number (3 char), View (2 char), section (2char), phase (1 char), revision (1 char) Samples: 123p0s2d0.dwg (job 1239, plan, 2nd floor, definitive drawing, emission), 459s0BBD0.dgn (job 123, section B, definitive drawing, emission). it produces a large number of photos that could then be CAD into a file format.

== Mechanical standards ==
=== Model-based definition ===
Model-based definition (MBD) is a method of product specification using elements within 3D models as defined by the US standard ASME Y14.41-2012. ASME Y14.41-2012 is based upon ASME Y14.5-2009 symbols and definition methods, such as geometry dimensioning and tolerancing (GD&T).

Subscribers of International Organization for Standardization (ISO) have the standards ISO 1101 and ISO 16792 for model-based definition.

=== Geometry quality ===
VDA 4955

== Product data quality ==
Product data quality (PDQ) is a field of product lifecycle management (PLM) relating to the quality of product data, particularly the geometrical and organizational quality of CAD data. Checkers, software that analyze CAD data formats, are often employed before and after data translation. The checkers can check the organization and quality of the data against internal company standards and international or industry standards. These checkers can be built into specific CAD packages or work on a number of CAD file formats.

In 2006–07 Part 59 of STEP ISO 10303-59 Product data representation and exchange: Integrated generic resource: Quality of product shape data is under development. It defines how to represent quality criteria together with measurement requirements and representation of inspection results.

== See also ==
- Model based definition
- Construction Project Information Committee
- Uniclass
- ISO Standards Handbook – Technical drawings, a broad collection of all basic ISO drawing standards
  - Vol.1 Technical drawings in general, ISBN 92-67-10370-9
  - Vol.2 Mechanical engineering drawings, construction drawings, drawing equipment, ISBN 92-67-10371-7
- ISO 128 Technical drawings—General principles of presentation
- ISO 13567 Technical product documentation – Organization and naming of layers for CAD
- ISO 16792 Technical product documentation – Digital product definition data practices, for the presentation of 3D models and GD&T
- ASTM F2915 Additive Manufacturing File Format
- IGES Initial Graphics Exchange Specification
- X3D ISO standardized royalty free 3D format – CAD Interchange sub-component of interest here.
- United States Military Standard
- Myriad (typeface) § MyriadCAD
- technical lettering
