= B91 =

B91 may refer to:

- Bundesstraße 91, a German road
- Loiblpass Straße, an Austrian road
- Sicilian Defence, Najdorf Variation, according to the list of chess openings
- Law, according to the Uniclass (Unified Classification for the Construction Industry) codes
