= Common Arrangement of Work Sections =

Common arrangement of work sections
- Front cover of Common arrangement of work sections for building works
- Author: CPIC
- Language: English
- Publisher: CPIC
- Publication date: 1998
- Publication place: UK
- Media type: Print (Paperback)
- Pages: 180
- ISBN: 0-9512662-5-X

Common Arrangement of Work Sections (CAWS), first published in 1987, is a construction industry working convention in the UK. It was designed to promote standardisation of, and detailed coordination between, bills of quantities and specifications. It is part of an industry-wide initiative to produce coordinated project information (now managed by the Construction Project Information Committee). CAWS has been used for the arrangement of the National Building Specification, the National Engineering Specification and the Standard Method of Measurement of Building Works (SMM7) (7th ed).

The new edition aligns CAWS with the Unified Classification for the Construction Industry (Uniclass) which was published in 1997.

The Common Arrangement is the authoritative UK classification of work sections for building work, for use in arranging project specifications and bills of quantities. Over 300 work sections are defined in detail to give:

- good coordination between drawings, specifications and bills of quantities
- predictability of location of relevant information
- fewer oversights and discrepancies between documents
- flexibility to the contractor in dividing the project information into work packages.

The classification of work sections is separate from, and complementary to, the classification of other concepts such as building types, elements, construction products and properties/characteristics. Uniclass, published in 1997, is the definitive overall classification tables, one of which is for work sections for buildings, comprising the Common Arrangement group, sub-group and work section headings.
