= ISO 13567 =

International standard

ISO 13567 is an international computer-aided design (CAD) layer standard.

== Standard parts ==
The standard is divided into three parts:

ISO 13567-1:2017
Technical product documentation — Organization and naming of layers for CAD — Part 1: Overview and principles
ISO 13567-2:2017
Technical product documentation — Organization and naming of layers for CAD — Part 2: Concepts, format and codes used in construction documentation
ISO/TR 13567-3:1999 (withdrawn September 2015)
Technical product documentation — Organization and naming of layers for CAD — Part 3: Application of ISO 13567-1 and ISO 13567-2

Standard has been developed by Technical Committee TC 10 (Technical product documentation) Subcommittee SC 8 (Construction documentation); Refer. ICS: 01.110; 35.240.10.

== Structure of layer names ==
CAD layer names are structured as a series of mandatory and optional fixed length fields, composed as a continuous alpha-numerical text string.

=== Mandatory fields ===
Agent responsible (clause 6.1)

(2 characters, indicating the person or organisation responsible for the layer information—manufacturer,

A- architect
A2 architect#2 on the same project
B- building surveyors
C- civil engineers
E- electrical engineers
F- facility engineers
G- GIS engineers and land surveyors
H- heating and ventilating engineers
I- interior designers
L- landscape architects
Q- quantity surveyors
S- structural engineers
T- town and country planners
W- contractors
X- sub-contractors
Y- specialist designers

Element (clause 6.2)

(6 characters, indicating the functional parts of construction works or structure): follows a classification system like CI/SfB building codes or Uniclass codes;

Presentation (clause 6.3)

(2 characters, related to the information graphical presentation)

-- whole model and drawing page,
E- element graphics (Model space)
T- text (M)
H- hatching (M)
D- dimensions (M)
J- section/detail marks (M)
K- revision marks (M)
G- Grid graphic and dimension (M)
U- user red lines & construction lines (M)
B- Border (Page/Paper space)
V- text, title, notes (P)
I- tabular information, legends, schedules, tables/query (P)
-1 language#1 or pen thickness#1 or text height#1

=== Optional fields ===
Status (clause 7.1)

(1 character, status of the physical part, ISO code)

- whole, no subdivision
N new part
E existing to remain
R to be removed
T temporary
O to be moved original position
F to be moved final position

Sector (clause 7.2)

(4 characters, physical subdivision of construction work, recommended to use ISO 4157-2/3 codes)

---- whole project, all levels all blocks
00—ground floor
02–2nd floor
-1-- basement
SA—section AA
EA—elevation A
EB—elevation B
--B1 block 1
--A- zone A
01B1 1st floor block#1
-2-- 2nd basement level
01A- storey 01 zone A

Phase (clause 7.3)

(1 character, time or logical subdivision of work)

- whole duration
P pre-design/preliminary
D design
R procurement
C construction
O post-construction
1 phase#1 (pre-design)
2 phase#2
3 phase#3 (licence design)

Projection (clause 7.4)

(1 character, work multiple views differentiation, ISO code)

- all
0 plan
1 elevation
2 section
3 3D model

Scale (clause 7.5)

(1 character, classification of layer information by the scale of final drawing, ISO code)

- all
A 1:1
B 1:5
C 1:10
D 1:20
E 1:50
F 1:100
G 1:200
H 1:500
I 1:1000
J 1:2000
K 1:5000
1 1:1-5
2 1:5-20
3 1:20-50
4 1:50-100
5 1:100-200
6 1:200-500
7 1:500-1000

Work Package (clause 7.6)

(2 characters, materials and/or work sections)

RC reinforced concrete
SS structural steel
23 phase#23

User Defined (clause 7.7)

(unlimited, additional subdivision or help plain description): description or subdivision.

=== Special characters ===
- (hyphenation)Used for all possible values of a specific character position. For no further subdivision use the hyphen character [4]
_ (underscore) Where a field is not being used or a decision has not been made [4]

== Applications ==
=== Resulting length ===
In practice, application of ISO 13567 fields can lead to short names (only mandatory fields), or much longer names (use of some or all optional fields in complex projects).

=== Short name samples ===
A-B374—T-
agent Architect, element Roof window in SfB, presentation text
A-B374—E-
agent Architect, element Roof window in SfB, presentation graphic element
Other

- A-374---T-
- A-24—__D-

=== Long name samples ===
A-37420-T2N01B113B23pro
agent Architect, element Roof Window in SfB, presentation Text#2, New part, floor 01, block B1, *phase 1, projection 3D, scale 1:5(B), work package 23 and user definition "pro"
A-G25---D-R
agent Architect, element wall in Uniclass, presentation dimensions, status Existing to be removed
Other

- A-2441__D-N01AB1
- A-37420-T2N01B113B23pro
- T-811---E-N----30F—DESCRIPTION_OF_LAYER
- E-63----E-N----30G—ELECTRICAL_EQUIPMENT
- A1645---Z-O----1-A72DESCRIPTION_OF_LAYER
- A-DUCTS-E-N02C------P281
- F-5821ABE-N-I--13C23USER
- A-144001M-----

=== List of layers in a standard architectural drawing ===
Agent is Architect, using ISO 13567 and Uniclass or CI/SfB Classification System.

==== Generic layers ====
A-------E-: all elements
A-------T-: text
A-------H-: hatchings
A-------D-: dimensions
A-------J-: section/detail marks
A-------K-: revision marks
A-------G-: grid (graphics and dimensions)
A-------U-: user (red and construction lines)

A-------B-: border (border lines/frame and other graphics) in paper space
A-------V-: text (title and notes) in paper space
A-------I-: tabular information (legends, schedules and tables) in paper space

A-------E-N: new work elements
A-------E-E: elements existing to remain 
A-------E-R: elements existing to be removed

A-------E1: line thickness 0,13 mm
A-------E2: line thickness 0,18 mm
A-------E3: line thickness 0,25 mm
A-------E4: line thickness 0,35 mm
A-------E5: line thickness 0,50 mm
A-------E6: line thickness 0,70 mm

A-------T1: text height 1,8 mm
A-------T2: text height 2,5 mm
A-------T3: text height 3,5 mm
A-------T4: text height 5,0 mm
A-------T5: text height 7,0 mm
A-------T6: text height 10,0 mm

==== Architectural layers using Uniclass ====
Uniclass 1.4 now superseded by Uniclass 2015

Using Uniclass Table G and Table H (exceptionally F and J tables).

A-F1----E-: zones (blocks, wings, floors, departments)
A-F2----E-: rooms 
A-F2----T-: room numbers and text
A-F3----E-: circulation (foyers, halls, stairs, corridors, gangways)
A-F9----E-: building space analysed (areas)
A-F911—E-: usable area (ISO 9836)
A-F912—E-: circulation area (ISO 9836)
A-F913—E-: services area (ISO 9836)
A-F914—E-: structural element area (ISO 9836)
A-F919—E-: gross area (ISO 9836)

A-G-----E-: building
A-G11---E-: site clearance
A-G12---E-: ground contouring
A-G2----E-: building fabric
A-G21---E-: foundations
A-G21---E5: foundations in section
A-G22---E-: floors, slabs
A-G22---E5: floors, slabs in section
A-G23---E-: stairs (incl. balustrades), ramps
A-G23---E5: stairs and ramps in section
A-G24---E-: roofs
A-G24---E5: roofs in section
A-G25---E-: walls
A-G25---E5: walls in section
A-G251—E-: external walls
A-G252—E-: internal walls
A-G253—E-: walls retaining
A-G26---E-: structural frame, columns, beams, bracing
A-G26---E5: structural frame, columns, beams, bracing in section
A-G261—E-: beams
A-G262—E-: columns
A-G3----E-: fabric: parts of elements
A-G312—E-: coverings or external finishes
A-G321—E-: windows
A-G322—E-: doors
A-G33---E-: internal finishes (on floor, ceilings, walls)
A-G331—E-: floor finishes
A-G332—E-: ceilings/soffit finishes
A-G333—E-: internal wall finishes
A-G4----E-: fittings, furnitures, equipments
A-G44---E-: sanitary fittings
A-G50---E-: water supply (water pipes)
A-G501—E-: cold water
A-G502—E-: hot water
A-G51---E-: gas supply
A-G52---E-: heating/ventilation/air conditioning (HVAC) (HVAC ductworks)
A-G53---E-: electric power (cable runs)
A-G54---E-: lighting fixtures (fittings)
A-G55---E-: communications (radio, TV, telephones, computer networks)
A-G561—E-: lifts
A-G562—E-: escalators
A-G57---E-: protection (security, fire)
A-G581—E-: removal /disposal, drainage
A-G6----E-: energy (heat, electricity) generation, storage and conversion
A-G621—E-: tanks  
A-G7----E-: external site works
A-G71---E-: surface treatment of external site (hard surfaces, landscaping)
A-G72---E-: enclosures of external site (fence, walls)
A-G74---E-: fittings/furnitures/equipment of external site (manholes)
A-G77---E-: underground drainage in external site (drain runs)

A-H-----E-: civil engineering works (non-building)
A-H1----E-: pavements and landscaping (ground, pavements, etc.)
A-H122—E-: surfacing to pavements and hard landscaping
A-H123—E-: edgework to pavements and hard landscaping
A-H132—E-: electrical installations (mechanical, lighting, power, communications)
A-H142—E-: fittings
A-H1422-E-: signs
A-H1424-E-: street furniture
A-H735—E-: drainage (non building)

A-JE0---E-: concrete
A-JF1---E-: block/brick work
A-JF2---E-: stone
A-JG1---E-: metal
A-JG10—E-: structural steel
A-JG2---E-: timber
A-JK3---E-: glass

A-Z1----V-: title sheet
A-Z22---V-: annotation (in paper space)
A-Z2211-T-: tags
A-Z2212-T-: labels
A-Z2213-T-: references
A-Z22131T-: room references
A-Z22132T-: door references
A-Z22133T-: window references
A-Z224—I-: legends (in paper space)
A-Z226—E-: key plan
A-Z227—E-: barscales
A-Z228—E-: north point
A-Z23---D-: dimensions
A-Z24---H-: hatching
A-Z241—E-: hatch boundaries
A-Z31---E-: external reference (Xref)
A-Z33---I-: tables and schedules
A-Z34---E-: images
A-Z41---E-: points
A-Z42---G-: gridlines
A-Z5----E-: drawing symbols
A-Z521—J-: section marks
A-Z522—J-: break marks
A-Z524—J-: void and opening markers
A-Z7----E-: presentation
A-Z71---E-: vehicles
A-Z72---E-: people
A-Z73---E-: trees and planting
A-Z74---H-: hatching
A-Z8----U-: read me and non-plotting
A-Z81---U-: construction lines

Note: Elements cut by section has been provisionally indicated as A-****--E5 (reflecting the use of a wider line). An alternative -but longest- notation could be A-****--E-------2 (defining the view as section) or A-****--ES.

==== Architectural layers using CI/SfB ====
A-100---E-: substructure
A-110---E-: groundwork
A-160---E-: foundations
A-170---E-: pile foundations
A-210---E-: external walls
A-214---E-: external curtain walls
A-220---E-: internal walls
A-226---E-: internal framing & cladding
A-230---E-: floors
A-240---E-: stairs
A-270---E-: roofs
A-28----E-: building frames
A-280---E-: beams and columns
A-281---E-: metal columns
A-282---E-: concrete columns
A-283---E-: metal beams
A-284---E-: concrete beams
A-285---E-: timber beams
A-310---E-: external wall completions
A-314---E-: external windows
A-315---E-: external doors
A-320---E-: internal wall completions
A-324---E-: internal windows
A-325---E-: internal doors
A-330---E-: floor completions
A-340---E-: stairs
A-350---E-: ceilings
A-370---E-: roof completions
A-374---E-: roof windows
A-410---E-: external wall finishes
A-420---E-: internal wall finishes
A-430---E-: floor finishes
A-440---E-: stair finishes
A-450---E-: ceiling finishes
A-470---E-: roof finishes
A-5-----E-: services, non electrical
A-500---E-: mechanical
A-52----E-: waste disposal, drainage
A-53----E-: water & liquid supply
A-54----E-: gas supply
A-55----E-: space cooling, refrigeration
A-56----E-: space heating
A-57----E-: ventilation
A-59----E-: parts, accessories to piped, ducted services
A-6-----E-: services, mainly electrical
A-600---E-: electrical
A-61----E-: electrical supply
A-62----E-: power supply
A-63----E-: lighting
A-630---E-: lamps
A-640---E-: communications
A-65----E-: telecommunications
A-660---E-: transports
A-661---E-: lifts
A-68----E-: security protection
A-700---E-: general fittings & furniture
A-71----E-: circulation fitting
A-72----E-: rest, work fittings 
A-73----E-: kitchens, culinary fittings
A-74----E-: sanitary fittings
A-75----E-: cleaning fittings
A-76----E-: storage fittings
A-77----E-: special activity fittings
A-78----E-: loose fittings
A-900---E-: external works
A-910---E-: site information
A-920---E-: survey information
A-930---E-: land drainage/services
A-940---E-: landscaping
A-950---E-: hard surfaces
A-960---E-: utilities
A-970---E-: fences/equipment
A-980---E-: special landscaping
A-990---E-: environmental data

== See also ==
- CAD standards
- Construction Project Information Committee
- Uniclass
- List of ISO standards
