= Model-based definition =

Annotating computer-aided design models

Model-based definition (MBD), sometimes called digital product definition (DPD), is the practice of using 3D models (such as solid models, 3D PMI and associated metadata) within 3D CAD software to define (provide specifications for) individual components and product assemblies. The types of information included are geometric dimensioning and tolerancing (GD&T), component level materials, assembly level bills of materials, engineering configurations, design intent, etc. By contrast, other methodologies have historically required accompanying use of 2D engineering drawings to provide such details.

== Use of the 3D digital data set ==
Modern 3D CAD applications allow for the insertion of engineering information such as dimensions, GD&T, notes and other product details within the 3D digital data set for components and assemblies. MBD uses such capabilities to establish the 3D digital data set as the source of these specifications and design authority for the product. The 3D digital data set may contain enough information to manufacture and inspect product without the need for engineering drawings. Engineering drawings have traditionally contained such information.

In many instances, use of some information from 3D digital data set (e.g., the solid model) allows for rapid prototyping of product via various processes, such as 3D printing. A manufacturer may be able to feed 3D digital data directly to manufacturing devices such as CNC machines to manufacture the final product.

== Limited Dimension Drawing ==
Limited Dimension Drawing (LDD), sometimes Reduced Dimension Drawing, are 2D drawings that only contain critical information, noting that all missing information is to be taken from an associated 3D model. For companies in transition to MBD from traditional 2D documentation a Limited Dimension Drawing allows for referencing 3D geometry while retaining a 2D drawing that can be used in existing corporate procedures. Only limited information is placed on the 2D drawing and then a note is placed to notify manufactures they must build off the 3D model for any dimensions not found on the 2D drawing.

== Standardization ==
In 2003, ASME published the ASME Y14.41 Digital Product Definition Data Practices, which was revised in 2012 and again in 2019. The standard provides for the use of many MBD aspects, such as GD&T display and other annotation behaviors within 3D modelling environment. ISO 16792 standardizes MBD within the ISO standards, sharing many similarities with the ASME standard. Other standards, such as ISO 1101 and of AS9100 also make use of MBD.

In 2013, the United States Department of Defense released MIL-STD-31000 Revision A to codify the use of MBD as a requirement for technical data packages (TDP).

== See also ==
- ASME Y14.41
- CAD standards
