= ASME Y14.41 =

ASME Y14.41 is a standard published by American Society of Mechanical Engineers (ASME) which establishes requirements and reference documents applicable to the preparation and revision of digital product definition data (also known as model-based definition), which pertains to CAD software and those who use CAD software to create the product definition within the 3D model. ASME issued the first version of this industrial standard on Aug 15, 2003 as ASME Y14.41-2003. It was immediately adopted by several industrial organizations, as well as the Department of Defense (DOD). The latest revision of ASME Y14.41 was issued on Jan 23, 2019 as ASME Y14.41-2019.

== History and purpose ==
ASME Y14.41 was born of the need to utilize Computer-aided design (CAD) data as a manufacturing and/or inspection source. In the late 1980s and early 1990s, solid modeling and CAD were becoming important tools for engineers looking to create and define increasingly complex geometry. For example, ergonomic and aerodynamic contoured surfaces were extremely difficult to define on engineering drawings. In response to requests from various segments of the industry, a new subcommittee began development of the standard in 1998.

Since various companies in industries including aerospace, automotive, agricultural, and heavy equipment had already begun utilizing the CAD data for industrial purposes without a standard, several definitions needed to be established as the universal interpretation. The standard was written to be independent of any specific CAD software implementation.

ASME Y14.41 served the basis for the international standard ISO 16792:2006 Technical product documentation — Digital product definition data practices. Both standards focus on the presentation of Geometric dimensioning and tolerancing (GD&T) together with the geometry of the product.

The material in the 2012 revision was reorganized to locate all of the information on a topic together in the text. This allows the reader to find all of the requirements for a functional area in one location. In addition, ASME Y14.41 was revised to incorporate changes based on the needs of industry and to reflect changes made to "ASME Y14.5-2009 Dimensioning and Tolerancing".

A definition of data set classifications was developed to describe the combinations of model and drawing graphics sheets that might be required by a customer. This material is being included in "ASME Y14.100 Engineering Drawing Practices", as it has broader applicability than is appropriate for ASME Y14.41.

== Methods ==
The standard addresses how to organize and present product definition data using CAD based data. Two methods are described.

=== Annotated Model Method ===
These portions cover the practices, requirements, and interpretation of the CAD data when there is no engineering drawing graphic sheet. All design requirements are indicated in 3D space and are associated to the model geometry.

=== Model and Drawing Graphic Sheet Method ===
These portions cover cases when both a CAD model and an engineering drawing graphic sheet are both used. Design requirements generally are indicated on the drawing graphic sheet. Refer to data set classifications in ASME Y14.100.

== Intended use ==
The ASME Y14.41 Standard is for any company with engineering, manufacturing, or inspection practices that contain or utilize CAD data. If a company designs or creates mock-ups in 3D, then ASME Y14.41 is the standard of choice for universal interpretation and industrial practices. If a company employs CAD, computer-aided manufacturing (CAM) or computer-aided inspection (CAI), such as coordinate measuring machine (CMM) inspection, then ASME Y14.41 is the standard of choice for universal interpretation and industrial practices.
