= Avanti (project) =

UK construction industry research project

Avanti logo

Avanti was established by the UK Department of Trade and Industry in 2002 to formulate an approach to collaborative working in order to enable construction project partners to work together effectively. The project was promoted by the Department of Trade and Industry with the support of most of the largest UK firms in the construction industry. Avanti also involved the International Alliance for Interoperability (IAI), Loughborough University and Co-Construct, a network of five construction research and information organizations.

The Avanti programme aimed to help overcome problems caused by incomplete, inaccurate and ambiguous information.

== Background ==
The Tavistock Institute report (1965) printed an extract from an RICS meeting of 1910 which stated "Architectural information is invariably inaccurate, ambiguous and incomplete". By the 1940s, the impact of this was valued at an additional 10% to the construction cost. By 1994 the Latham Report Constructing the Team suggested waste in the industry accounted for 25-30% of project costs. This figure is supported by earlier publications from the Building Research Establishment (BRE) and the Building Services Research and Information Association (BSRIA), which led to reports in 1987 from the Coordinating Committee for Project Information (now CPIC) that recommended a common format and disciplined approach to reduce the problem. These suggestions were proven on DTI-funded projects and case studies at Endeavour House at London Stansted Airport and the BAA Heathrow Express, which showed that significant savings in project cost and drawing production could be made by addressing people and process issues.

== The problem and approach ==
Most construction projects are complex and involve co-ordination between many project participants both on- and off-site. As projects have increased in size and complexity, the number of participants involved in a single project has also increased. To improve collaboration between participants, the industry needs tools that work well, appropriate processes to implement them, and the right approach from the people involved. Tackling these points was at the heart of the Avanti action research programme.

Its purpose was to support live construction project teams, as they collaborate to deliver projects, by helping them apply the appropriate technologies. It worked through a team of partners representing each stage of the project process, with the objective of improving project and business performance through the use of information and communication technologies (ICT) to support collaborative working. It set out to show the advantages of CAD systems over conventional drawings, with information managed as a database rather than a drawing cabinet, and aimed to demonstrate that 3D Computer Aided Design systems could revolutionise projects, provided they were used for more than visualisation.

To reduce the risks involved in adopting new working methods, Avanti brought together areas of current best practice (such as CPIC protocols) that had previously gained too little market penetration to have significant impact on the sector. The objective was to deliver improved project and business performance by using ICT to support collaborative working.

Avanti focused on early access to all project information by all partners, on early involvement of the supply chain, and on sharing of information, drawings and schedules, in an agreed and consistent manner. The Avanti approach was supported by handbooks, toolkits and on-site mentoring and was reliant on advice and materials provided by CPIC.

Avanti mobilised existing technologies to improve business performance by increasing the quality of information and predictability of outcomes and by reducing risk and waste. The core of the Avanti approach to a project's whole life cycle was based on team-working and access to a common information model. All CAD information was generated with the same origin, orientation and scale, and organised in layers that could be shared. All layers and CAD model files were named consistently within a specific Avanti convention to allow others to find the relevant CAD data.

== Guidance and phases ==
Learning from early projects, Avanti produced practical working documentation and tested the methods on live projects. This information supplemented the CPIC document Code of Procedure for the Construction Industry and addressed problems of incomplete, inaccurate and ambiguous information. Avanti guidance included:

- Standard Method and Procedure - advice on classification standards, spatial and technical co-ordination, example file and directory structures, and naming conventions.
- Design Management Principles - comprising typical design management processes, information management processes, guidance on detailed task management and typical responsibilities of delivery team leaders.

The advice also covers areas such as:

- a business case on the commercial imperatives for collaborative ICT
- guidance on ensuring the software chain supported the design and supply chains
- authoring information in a common data environment and controlling the sharing of information in a multi-author environment

For most projects, using this guidance consisted of three phases:

- Phase 1: Change the poor industry practice of producing information to individual standards and throwing it ‘over the wall’ to the next person in the supply chain who then reproduces their own information. Using an agreed standard for the project, spatially co-ordinated and high-quality 2D information will then be produced for the parties involved.
- Phase 2: Implementation of those same principles to generate 3D project models to produce 2D drawings and material measurement.
- Phase 3: Full implementation of 3D object-oriented and Building information modelling systems. Each live project captures the lessons learned and the benefits gained.

== Further development ==
In July 2006, the Avanti DTI Project documentation and brand ownership was transferred to Constructing Excellence. Since the handover, Constructing Excellence endeavoured to promote the savings demonstrated on live projects. Further work was also carried out to make Avanti part of the update of BS 1192. The BS 5555 committee coded the methods.

== Results ==
Evaluation of the impacts of the Avanti project showed:

- Early commitment offering up to 80% saving on implementation cost on medium size project.
- 50-85% saving on effort spent receiving information and formatting for reuse.
- 60-80% saving on effort spent finding information and documents.
- 75–80% saving in effort to achieve design co-ordination.
- 50% saving on time spent to assess tenders and award sub-contracts.
- 50% saving on effort in sub-contractor design approval.

== The future ==
Constructing Excellence is developing a self-sustaining business to support roll out of the Avanti methodology to the UK construction industry. It will also draw on the results of other DTI-supported collaborative research such as Building Down Barriers.

== See also ==
- CPIC
