= National Building Specification =

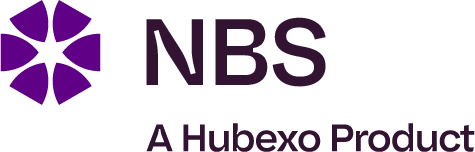
National Building Specification logo

NBS (National Building Specification) is a UK-based business providing construction specification information used by architects, engineers and other building professionals to describe the materials, standards and workmanship of a construction project.

== History ==
A specification often forms part of the tender documentation along with architectural drawings for a contractor to price and then forms part of the contract documentation for the builder to construct the building.

The National Building Specification was launched in 1973 and by 2006 its information was being used by customers in over 5000 offices. Since 1988 the NBS data has been structured on the Common Arrangement of Work Sections, based on work undertaken through the Co-ordinating Committee for Project Information - later the Construction Project Information Committee (CPIC).

Until 2018, NBS was owned by the Royal Institute of British Architects (RIBA) via its RIBA Enterprises subsidiary. In June 2018, the RIBA announced it was selling a £31.8 million stake in RIBA Enterprises, to LDC, the private equity arm of Lloyds Bank. In November 2020, NBS was sold to Byggfakta Group (now known as Hubexo), a global company which provides data, insights and software solutions to the construction industry. In early 2021 the RIBA received £113 million from the sale of its stake in NBS.

== Products ==
NBS maintains and updates Uniclass 2015, a unified classification system for all sectors of the UK construction industry. Uniclass (Unified Classification for the Construction Industry) was originally created by the CPIC, with the first edition released in 1997. NBS was then commissioned to support development of Uniclass2, launched in March 2013. Work on Uniclass2 was ceded to the UK government in 2014, when an NBS-led team won a £1m Technology Strategy Board contract to develop a free-to-use 'Digital Toolkit for BIM', including the classification system, launched in 2015.

In 2012, NBS launched the National BIM Library, featuring a range of generic and proprietary construction elements suitable for building information modeling.

In 2019 NBS released NBS Chorus, a fully online specification platform for construction.

In 2020 NBS released NBS Source, a new online tool, incorporating the National BIM Library, that created a single source for product information.
