= ISO 13399 =

Standard about cutting tool product data

ISO 13399 (Cutting tool data representation and exchange) is an international technical standard by ISO (the International Organization for Standardization) for the computer-interpretable representation and exchange of industrial product data about cutting tools and toolholders. The objective is to provide a mechanism capable of describing product data regarding cutting tools, independent from any particular system. The nature of this description makes it suitable not only for neutral file exchange (free of proprietary format constraints), but also as a basis for implementing and sharing product databases and archiving, regarding cutting tools.

Typically ISO 13399 can be used to exchange data between computer-aided design (CAD), computer-aided manufacturing (CAM), computer-aided engineering (CAE), tool management software, product data management (PDM/EDM), manufacturing resource planning (MRP) or enterprise resource planning (ERP), and other computer-aided technologies (CAx) and systems.

The usage of the ISO 13399 standard will simplify the exchange of data for cutting tools. Expected results are lower cost for managing the information about tools and a more accurate and efficient usage of manufacturing resources. The ISO 13399 has been developed with contributions from AB Sandvik Coromant, the Royal Institute of Technology in Stockholm, Kennametal Inc, and Ferroday Ltd.

ISO 13399 is developed and maintained by the ISO technical committee TC 29, Small tools, sub-committee WG34. Like other ISO and IEC standards ISO 13399 is copyright by ISO and is not freely available.

== See also ==
- List of ISO standards 12000–13999 § ISO 13000 – ISO 13999
