= Restricted Enforcement Unit =

The Restricted Enforcement Unit (REU) is an expert-level committee set up in 1987 by the British government to control exports of military technology from the United Kingdom, in particular the illegal export or trade of conventional weaponry and weapons of mass destruction not licensed for export by the Department of Trade and Industry.

The committee assesses and acts on intelligence of attempted, planned or accomplished breaches of UK export controls on sensitive items or technology to "countries of concern". It co-ordinates seizure or blocking of such materiel via its member departments.

== Committee structure ==
The REU committee meets fortnightly, and is chaired by the Department of Trade and Industry. The REU includes representatives from the following government departments and intelligence agencies:

- The Foreign and Commonwealth Office
- The Ministry of Defence
- His Majesty's Revenue and Customs (formerly His Majesty's Customs and Excise)
- The Security Service (MI5)
- The Secret Intelligence Service (MI6)
- Government Communications Headquarters (GCHQ)

== Known cases ==
- The REU heard evidence of the involvement of British companies in Iraq's attempt to construct a supergun, Project Babylon, and co-ordinated the seizure of parts for the gun.
