= Global Watch =

Global Watch was a website and service of the UK Department of Trade and Industry between 1983 and 2007. The stated objective of the Global Watch Service was to provide support dedicated to helping UK businesses improve their competitiveness by identifying and accessing innovative technologies and practices from overseas.
