= ISO/IEC TR 12182 =

Information technology standard

ISO/IEC TR 12182 is an Information technology standard published in 1998 by the Joint Task Committee 1 (JTC1) of the International Organization for Standardization (ISO) and the International Electrotechnical Commission (IEC). It defines a software categorization in the field of software engineering.
