= CI/SfB =

Classification system for building information

CI/SfB (Construction Indexing/Samarbetskommittén för Byggnadsfrågor) is a classification system used in the construction industry to organize and manage building information. It was originally developed in Sweden and introduced to the UK by the Royal Institute of British Architects (RIBA) in 1961.

== History ==
The CI/SfB system was derived from the Swedish system "Samarbetskommittén för Byggnadsfrågor" (SfB) (meaning "The Cooperation Committee for Building Issues"), which was created in the 1950s. The system was designed to provide a standardized method for indexing and retrieving construction-related information.

The system was adopted internationally by CIB (Conseil Internationale du Batiment) and recommended to members institutes. The RIBA took a licence to establish an Agency for SfB in the UK and recommended its use with UDC in 1961 for architects libraries.

The CIB (Conseil Internationale du Batiment) opted for a procedure for having a different name for each Country. Some versions are:

- CI / SfB for Great Britain
- SI / SfB for France
- BRD / SfB for Germany
- BB / SfB for Belgium
- NL / SfB for The Netherlands

In 1968, the RIBA published a revised version called CI/SfB (Construction Index SfB) which dropped the use of UDC and added two new tables to SfB tables 1, 2 and 3. Table 0 was roughly based on UDC and Table 4 on the CIB Master List of Properties, with additions. There was a further revision in 1976.

In the UK, it was first implemented as the "SfB/UDC Building Filing Manual" and later evolved into the CI/SfB system. CI/SfB was superseded in the UK by the Uniclass system, first published in 1997, with the latest edition, Uniclass 2015, released in April 2015 and updated quarterly.

== Usage ==
CI/SfB is used for various purposes in the construction industry, including:

- Setting up office libraries
- Collecting design information
- Preparing reports, cost plans, drawings, and specifications
- Organizing bills of quantities and other types of construction information.

== List of CI/SfB Codes ==
=== Table 0: Physical Environment ===
==== Planning areas ====
===== 0: Planning areas =====
- 01: Extra terrestrial areas
- 02: International, national scale planning areas
- 03: Regional, sub-regional scale planning areas
- 04
- 05: Rural, urban planning areas
- 06: Land use planning areas
- 07
- 08: Other planning areas
- 09: Common areas relevant to planning

==== Facilities ====
===== 1: Utilities, civil engineering facilities =====
- 11: Rail transport
- 12: Road transport
- 13: Water transport
- 14: Air transport, other transport
- 15: Communications
- 16: Power supply, mineral supply
- 17: Water supply, waste disposal
- 18: Other

===== 2: Industrial facilities =====
- 21–25
- 26: Agricultural
- 27: Manufacturing
- 28: Other

===== 3: Administrative, commercial, protective service facilities =====
- 31: Official administration, law courts
- 32: Offices
- 33: Commercial
- 34: Trading, shops
- 35–36
- 37: Protective services
- 38: Other

===== 4: Health, welfare facilities =====
- 41: Hospitals
- 42: Other medical
- 43
- 44: Welfare, homes
- 45
- 46: Animal welfare
- 47
- 48: Other

===== 5: Recreation facilities =====
- 51: Refreshment
- 52: Entertainment
- 53: Social recreation, clubs
- 54: Aquatic sports
- 55
- 56: Sports
- 57
- 58: Other

===== 6: Religious facilities =====
- 61: Religious centres
- 62: Cathedrals
- 63: Churches, chapels
- 64: Mission halls, meeting houses
- 65: Temples, mosques, synagogues
- 66: Convents
- 67: Funerary, shrines
- 68: Other

===== 7: Educational, scientific, information facilities =====
- 71: Schools
- 72: Universities, colleges
- 73: Scientific
- 74
- 75: Exhibitions, display
- 76: Information, libraries
- 77
- 78: Other

===== 8: Residential facilities =====
- 81: Housing
- 82: One-off housing units, houses
- 83
- 84: Special housing
- 85: Communal residential
- 86: Historical residential
- 87: Temporary, mobile residential
- 88: Other

===== 9: Common facilities, other facilities =====
- 91: Circulation
- 92: Rest, work
- 93: Culinary
- 94: Sanitary, hygiene
- 95: Cleaning, maintenance
- 96: Storage
- 97: Processing, plant, control
- 98: Other; cuildings other than function
- 99: Parts of facilities; other aspects of the physical environment; architecture, landscape

=== Table 1: Elements ===
- (--) Sites, projects, building systems

==== Substructure ====
- (1-) Ground, substructure
  - (10)
  - (11) Ground
  - (12)
  - (13) Floor beds
  - (14)
  - (15)
  - (16) Retaining walls, foundations
  - (17) Pile foundations
  - (18) Other substructure elements
  - (19) Parts of elements (11) to (18)
  - Cost summary

==== Structure ====
- (2-) Primary elements, carcass
  - (20)
  - (21) Walls, external walls
  - (22) Internal walls, partitions
  - (23) Floors, galleries
  - (24) Stairs, ramps
  - (25)
  - (26)
  - (27) Roofs
  - (28) Building frames, other primary elements
  - (29) Parts of elements (21) to (28)
  - Cost summary
- (3-) Secondary elements, completion if described separately from (2-)
  - (30)
  - (31) Secondary elements to external walls; external doors, windows
  - (32) Secondary elements to internal walls; internal doors
  - (33) Secondary elements to floors
  - (34) Secondary elements to stairs
  - (35) Suspended ceilings
  - (36)
  - (37) Secondary elements to roofs; rooflights, etc.
  - (38) Other secondary elements
  - (39) Parts of elements (31) to (38)
  - Cost summary
- (4-) Finishes if described separately
  - (40)
  - (41) Wall finishes, external
  - (42) Wall finishes, internal
  - (43) Floor finishes
  - (44) Stair finishes
  - (45) Ceiling finishes
  - (46)
  - (47) Roof finishes
  - (48) Other finishes to structure
  - (49) Parts of elements (41) to (48)
  - Cost summary

==== Services ====
- (5-) Services, mainly piped and ducted
  - (50)
  - (51)
  - (52) Waste disposal, drainage
  - (53) Liquids supply
  - (54) Gases supply
  - (55) Space cooling
  - (56) Space heating
  - (57) Air conditioning, ventilation
  - (58) Other piped, ducted services
  - (59) Parts of elements (51) to (58)
  - Cost summary
- (6-) Services, mainly electrical
  - (60)
  - (61) Electrical supply
  - (62) Power
  - (63) Lighting
  - (64) Communications
  - (65)
  - (66) Transport
  - (67)
  - (68) Security, control, other services
  - (69) Parts of elements (61) to (68)
  - Cost summary

==== Fittings ====
- (7-) Fittings
  - (70)
  - (71) Circulation fittings
  - (72) Rest, work fittings
  - (73) Culinary fittings
  - (74) Sanitary, hygiene fittings
  - (75) Cleaning, maintenance fittings
  - (76) Storage, screening fittings
  - (77) Special activity fittings
  - (78) Other fittings
  - (79) Parts of elements (71) to (78)
  - Cost summary
- (8-) Loose furniture, equipment
  - (80)
  - (81) Circulation loose equipment
  - (82) Rest, work loose equipment
  - (83) Culinary loose equipment
  - (84) Sanitary, hygiene loose equipment
  - (85) Cleaning, maintenance loose equipment
  - (86) Storage, screening loose equipment
  - (87) Special activity loose equipment
  - (88) Other loose equipment
  - (89) Parts of elements (81) to (88)
  - Cost summary

==== External, other elements ====
- (9-) External, other elements
  - (90) External works
  - (91)
  - (92)
  - (93)
  - (94)
  - (95)
  - (96)
  - (97)
  - (98) Other elements
  - (99) Parts of elements (91) to (98)
  - Cost summary

=== Table 2: Constructions and Forms ===
- A: Construction, forms
- B:
- C:
- D:
- E: Cast in situ work
- F: Block work; blocks
- G: Large block, panel work; large blocks, panels
- H: Section work; sections
- I: Pipe work; pipes
- J: Wire work, mesh work; wires, meshes
- K: Quilt work, quilts
- L: Flexible sheet work (proofing); flexible sheets (proofing)
- M: Malleable sheet work; malleable sheets
- N: Rigid sheet overlap work; rigid sheets for overlapping
- P: Thick coating work
- Q
- R: Rigid sheet work; rigid sheets
- S: Rigid tile work; rigid tiles
- T: Flexible sheet work; flexible sheets
- U
- V: Film coating and impregnation work
- W: Planting work; plants, seeds
- X: Work with components; components
- Y: Formless work; Products
- Z: Joints

=== Table 3: Materials ===
- a: Materials
- b
- c
- d

==== Formed materials e/o ====
- e: Natural stone
- f: Precast with binder
- g: Clay (dried, fired)
- h: Metal
- i: Wood
- j: Vegetable and animal materials
- k
- m: Inorganic fibres
- n: Rubbers, plastics, etc.
- o: Glass

==== Formless materials p/s ====
- p: Aggregates, loose fills
- q: Lime and cement binders, mortars, concretes
- r: Clay, gypsum, magnesia and plastic binders, mortars
- s: Bitominous materials

==== Functional materials t/w ====
- t: Fixing and jointing materials
- u: Protective and process/property modifying materials
- v: Paints
- w: Ancillary materials
- x
- y: Composite materials
- z: Substances

=== Table 4: Activities and Requirements ===
==== Activities, aids ====
- (A) Administration and management activities, aids
- (B) Construction plant, tools
- (C)
- (D) Construction operations

==== Requirements, properties ====
- (E/G) Description
- (H) Context, environment
- (J/T) Performance factors
- (U) Users, resources
- (V) Working factors
- (W) Operation, maintenance factors
- (X) Change, movement, stability factors
- (Y) Economic, commercial factors
- (Z) Peripheral subjects; forms of presentation; time; space
