= National CAD Standard =

American collaboration between CAD and BIM users

The National CAD Standard (NCS) is a collaborative effort in the United States among computer-aided design (CAD) and building information modeling (BIM) users. Its goal is to create a unified approach to the creation of building design data. Development of the NCS is open to all building professionals in a collaborative process led by the buildingSMART Alliance.

The NCS is composed of CAD layer guidelines from the American Institute of Architects, uniform drawing system modules from the Construction Specifications Institute, and BIM implementation and plotting guidelines from the National Institute of Building Sciences. Adoption of the NCS is voluntary, however adopting companies and agencies can require its use by their associates.
