= Department of Trade and Industry (United Kingdom) =

1970–2007 department of the United Kingdom government

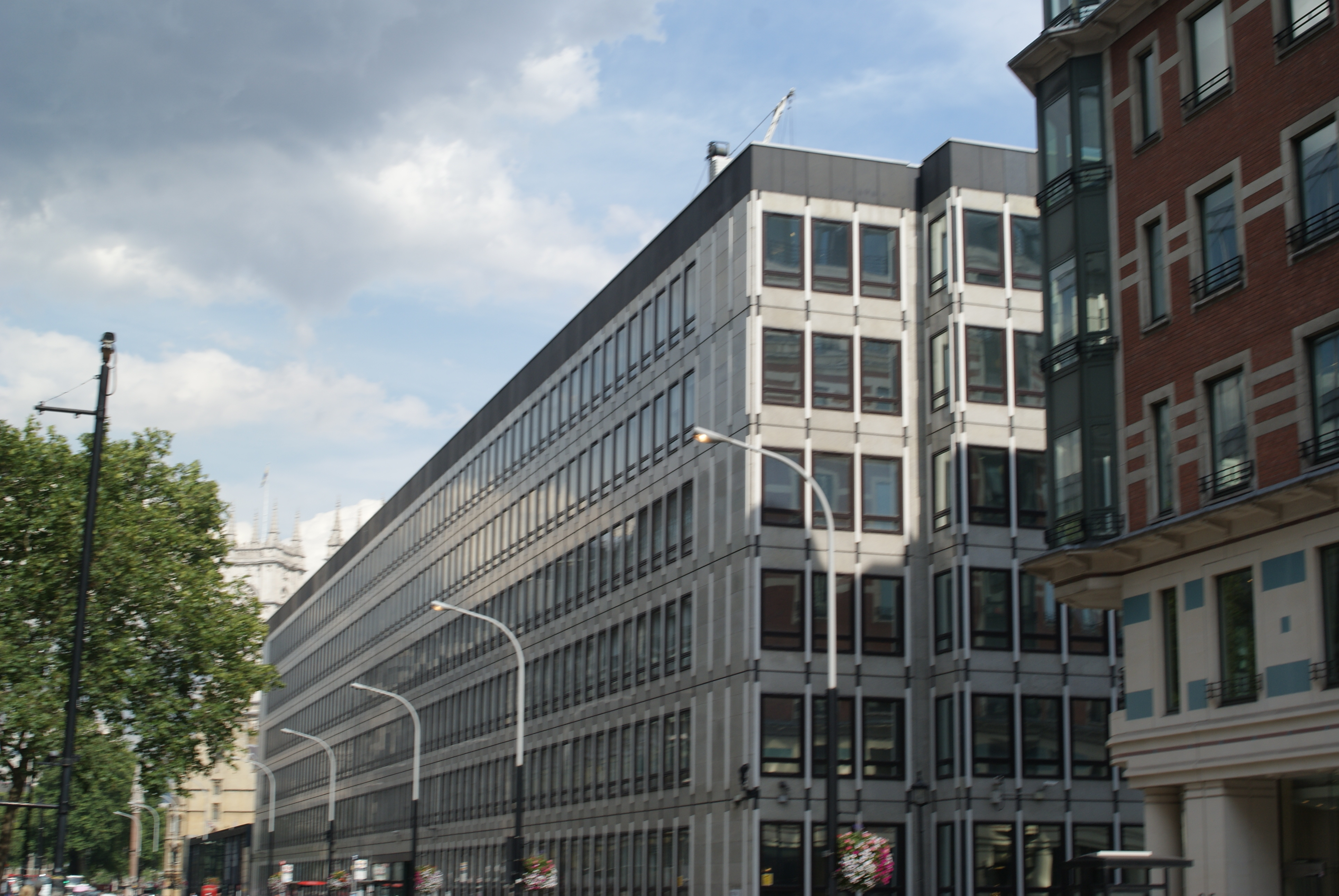

Department overview
- Formed: 19 October 1970
- Preceding agencies: Board of Trade; Ministry of Technology
- Dissolved: 28 June 2007
- Superseding agencies: Department for Business, Enterprise and Regulatory Reform; Department for Innovation, Universities and Skills
- Jurisdiction: United Kingdom
- Headquarters: Victoria Street, London
- Minister responsible: Various incumbents, Secretary of State for Trade and Industry
- Website: The DTI website at the National Archives

The Department of Trade and Industry (DTI) was a United Kingdom government department formed on 19 October 1970. It was replaced with the creation of the Department for Business, Enterprise and Regulatory Reform and the Department for Innovation, Universities and Skills on 28 June 2007.

== History ==
The department was formed on 19 October 1970 through the merger of the Board of Trade and the Ministry of Technology, creating a new cabinet post of Secretary of State for Trade and Industry. Additionally, the department also took over the Department of Employment's former responsibilities for monopolies and mergers. However, in January 1974, the department's responsibilities for energy production were transferred to a newly created Department of Energy. On 5 March that year, following a Labour Party victory in the February 1974 general election, the department was split into the Department of Trade, the Department of Industry and the Department of Prices and Consumer Protection.

The departments of Trade and Industry were reunited in 1983. The Department of Energy was re-merged back into the DTI in 1992, but various media-related functions transferred to the Department of National Heritage. Until it was succeeded in June 2007 the DTI continued to set the energy policy of the United Kingdom.

After the 2005 general election the DTI was renamed to the Department for Productivity, Energy and Industry, but the name reverted to Department of Trade and Industry less than a week later, after widespread derision, including some from the Confederation of British Industry.

In 2007, part of DTI merged into the new Department for Innovation, Universities and Skills (DIUS), while most of it was renamed as the Department for Business, Enterprise and Regulatory Reform (BERR); part of that would become the Department of Energy and Climate Change (DECC) in 2008. The responsibilities which had gone to DIUS largely returned in 2009 with a re-merger to create the Department for Business, Innovation and Skills (BIS), though in 2016 the Department for International Trade (DIT) was split off. Energy returned in 2017 with the creation of the Department for Business, Energy and Industrial Strategy (BEIS); BEIS lasted until 2023 when this department was again split and mixed with other responsibilities, into the Department for Business and Trade (DBT), the Department for Energy Security and Net Zero (DESNZ) and the Department for Science, Innovation and Technology (DSIT).

== Structure ==
The DTI had a wide range of responsibilities. There were ultimately nine main areas covered by the DTI:

- Company Law
- Trade
- Business Growth
- Innovation
- Employment Law
- Regional Economic Development
- Energy
- Science
- Consumer Law.

=== Corporate policing ===
It also had responsibility for investigating misconduct by company directors, in which role Private Eye repeatedly lampooned it as "the Department of Timidity and Inaction".

== Ministers ==
Final ministers included.

Minister	Portrait	Title	Portfolio
Alistair Darling		Secretary of State for Trade and Industry; President of the Board of Trade	Overall responsibility for the Department of Trade and Industry and its policies including leading on energy.
Margaret Hodge		Minister of State for Industry & the Regions	Responsibility for Business and Enterprise Group issues, including: Enterprise, growth and business investment; Strengthening regional economies; Small Business Service; E-commerce; Communications and information industries; Companies Act implementation; Companies House; Company Law Reform Bill; Shareholder Executive Industrial Development Unit portfolio; Corporate Social Responsibility.
Ian McCartney		Minister of State for Trade	Responsible for trade policy; UK Trade and Investment; Export Credits Guarantee Department; Foreign Affairs (FCO); Competition; Consumer affairs; Corporate governance. Also attends Cabinet; Jointly with Foreign and Commonwealth Office.
Malcolm Wicks		Minister of State for Science & Innovation	Responsible for Science and engineering; 10 year investment framework for science and innovation; Office of Science and Innovation (OSI); Research Councils; Knowledge Transfer and Innovation; Technology Strategy; Patent Office; National Weights and Measures Laboratory (NWML); Chemicals; Bioscience; DTI's interest in skills; British National Space Centre (BNSC); Waste Electronic and Waste Equipment (WEEE); Coal Health claims; Export control; Steel; Supports the Secretary of State on energy in the House of Commons.
Peter Truscott, Baron Truscott		Parliamentary Under Secretary of State for Energy	Supports the Secretary of State on energy issues; Sustainability and the environment; Security of energy supply; Fuel poverty; Nuclear security; Shareholder Executive energy portfolio; Covers all DTI business in the House of Lords.
Jim Fitzpatrick		Parliamentary Under-Secretary for Employment Relations & Postal Services; Minister for London	Responsibility for maximising potential in the workplace; ACAS; Shareholder Executive oversight plus Royal Mail and Post Office; Corporate & Insolvency activity; Insolvency Service; Also Minister for London.

== Business advice and support ==
From 1999 to 2005 it led the national E-Commerce Awards with InterForum, a not for profit membership organisation which helped British businesses to trade electronically. This aimed to encourage small and medium-sized enterprises to develop their businesses through the use of E-commerce technologies.

A series of guidance documents concerned with business purchasing operations and supply chain management was published in 1991.

=== Small firms' Merit Award for Research and Technology ===
The Small firms' Merit Award for Research and Technology (SMART) was a discretionary business grant scheme run by the DTI for a number of years in the 1980s and 1990s. The award was made to companies winning an annual competition (organised regionally) based on a judgement of the technical and market viability of research or technology development proposals; in essence the award represented seed-corn funding for innovative developments that had some market potential.

The scheme was generally considered to be very successful. In 2002 the scheme was changed from a competition to an award to any applicant who met minimum criteria. This led to several regions exhausting their budget. In 2005 the scheme was shut down and replaced with the Grant for Research and Development which was again a regional competition.

== See also ==
- Avanti (project)
- Energy in the United Kingdom
- Restricted Enforcement Unit
- United Kingdom budget
- Business Link – set up by the DTI in 1993
- UK Trade & Investment – set up in 1999
- Special Representative for International Trade and Investment
