= Computer-aided inspection =

Computing application process

Computer-aided inspection (CAI) is the use of software tools to assess manufactured objects. It is closely related to computer-aided design (CAD) and computer-aided manufacturing (CAM). Its primary purpose is to allow engineers to more quickly and precisely assess the physical properties of manufactured objects. These properties can include dimensions, material consistency, roughness and roundness.

== Uses ==
CAI has applications in industries ranging from food production to aerospace, commonly being used in the quality assurance step of the manufacturing process. It involves comparing manufactured objects with a CAD model, technical drawing or data sheet to ensure that the finished product is within specification and meets design intent.

== Technologies ==
CAI machines can use a variety of technologies depending on the material of the product to be inspected, the properties to be measured, and the precision required.

=== Digital Cameras ===
Digital cameras are frequently used in situations where the shape or colour of an object needs to be analysed. Using machine vision, the CAI program can make decisions about objects by comparing them to a master photo or data array.

=== Laser Scanning ===
Laser scanning CAI machines use point clouds to generate a 3D model which is compared to the required specification. Laser scanners are generally used to check the external geometry of parts with low reflectivity and translucence.

=== Structured Light Scanning ===
Structured light scanners use projected light patterns and digital cameras to analyse the geometry of an object. As with laser scanning, objects with high reflectivity and translucence can cause problems but temporary coatings can be applied to prevent this.

=== CT Scanning ===
Industrial CT scanners use X-rays to image an object from many angles, building up a 3D image to compare to a specification. CT scans can be used to analyse the internal geometry of parts because the X-rays penetrate the object being scanned. Higher resolution CT scans can also check for cavities, cracks, and other undesirable features inside parts.

== See also ==
- Computer-aided design
- Computer-aided manufacturing
- Coordinate-measuring machine
