= Construction Project Information Committee =

British construction organisation

Production Information
- Front cover of Production Information: a code of procedure for the construction industry
- Author: CPIC
- Language: English
- Publisher: CPIC
- Publication date: First Edition 2003
- Publication place: United Kingdom
- Media type: Print (Paperback)
- Pages: 152
- ISBN: 0-9512662-6-8

The Construction Project Information Committee (CPIC) was an advisory group, comprising representatives of major UK construction industry institutions, which provided best practice guidance on the content, form and preparation of construction production information. Established in the late 1980s, it helped develop key industry approaches that today support building information modelling (BIM) and related information management processes. CPIC ceased activity in the early 2020s.

== History ==
CPIC started as the Building Project Information Committee (BPIC), established in February 1987 by the RIBA, the RICS, the Building Employers Confederation, and ACE (who resigned in 1992 and was replaced by the CIBSE and the ICE, at which point it became CPIC to reflect a wider focus than just buildings). BPIC itself had succeeded the Co-ordinating Committee for Project Information (CCPI) which had been established to provide guidance on efficient preparation of project specifications and production drawings.

Research showed that many problems on site are caused by poor or missing production information. Improving production information reduced the incidence of site quality problems and led to significant construction cost savings.

In 1987 CCPI published four documents: Project Specification: A Code of Procedure for Building Works, Production Drawings: A Code of Procedure for Building Works, A Common Arrangement of Work Sections for Building Works (CAWS), and Co-ordinated Project Information – A Guide with examples. The principles described in these documents were then adopted in the preparation of further industry guidance including The Standard Method of Measurement for Building Works (7th edition), the National Building Specification (NBS) and the National Engineering Specification (NES).

=== Uniclass (1997) ===
Some of the proceeds from sales of these publications contributed towards the cost of a feasibility study on a Unified Classification for the Construction Industry (Uniclass), first published in 1997 as a 215-page printed book (mainly comprising tables). The content ("Uniclass 1") was maintained in a printed form until 2013.

=== Avanti ===
In the early 2000s, the Department of Trade and Industry funded a project, Avanti, exploring the use of the CPIC protocols on a series of projects which were also deploying computer-enabled collaborative working. Avanti showed that the use of CPIC materials would improve the quality and reduce the costs of construction projects.

=== Production Information: a code of procedure for the construction industry (2003) ===
In 2003, the two 1987 Codes of Procedure were superseded by a new combined publication, Production Information: a code of procedure for the construction industry. This drew on early experiences in the Avanti project, including the growing use of computer-aided design. It provided practical guidance on use of drawings, specifications and schedules of work and the methods used to co-ordinate the information they contained within, and stressed standardisation, information re-use and information management. The Code and a later CPIC project, the CPiX Protocol, helped develop document templates and procedures that evolved into BS 1192:2007 (itself a precursor of ISO 19650).

CPIC's membership had expanded by 2011 to include representatives from the RIBA, RICS, UK Contractors Group (a successor of the BEC), ICE, CIBSE, the Chartered Institute of Architectural Technologists (CIAT), and the Chartered Institute of Building (CIOB). The Landscape Institute later also became a member.

=== BIM ===
CPIC representatives became key players in the developing UK adoption of building information modelling (BIM).

In May 2011 UK Government Chief Construction Adviser Paul Morrell called for BIM adoption on UK government construction projects; he also told construction professionals to adopt BIM or be "Betamaxed out" - a statement welcomed by CPIC. In June 2011 the UK government published its BIM strategy, announcing its intention to require collaborative 3D BIM (with all project and asset information, documentation and data being electronic) on its projects by 2016.

From June 2011, the UK Government BIM Task Group led the government's BIM programme and requirements, including a free-to-use set of UK standards and tools that defined 'level 2 BIM', and key CPIC individuals were involved in various working groups (for example, as part of the Plan of Works group). During this time, in 2013, CPIC's work on Uniclass stopped and was ceded to government in 2014. In April 2016, the UK Government published a new central web portal as a point of reference for the industry for 'level 2 BIM'. The work of the BIM Task Group then continued under the stewardship of the Cambridge-based Centre for Digital Built Britain (CDBB), announced in December 2017 and formally launched in early 2018.

The CPIC website was discontinued in 2025, with some content archived to Designing Buildings.
