= ISO 12944 =

ISO 12944 is an international standard on corrosion protection of steel structures by protective paint systems. It consists of several parts:

- Part 1: General introduction
- Part 2: Classification of environments
- Part 3: Design considerations
- Part 4: Types of surface and surface preparation
- Part 5: Protective paint systems
- Part 6: Laboratory performance test methods and associated assessment criteria
- Part 7: Execution and supervision of paint work
- Part 8: Development of specifications for new work and maintenance
- Part 9: Protective paint systems and laboratory performance test methods for offshore and related structures

== See also ==
- EN 1993 Eurocode 3 – Design of steel structures (a European Standard that references ISO 12944)
