= ISO 12006 =

International standard

ISO 12006 is within the discipline of architecture for building construction.

- ISO 12006 "Building construction - Organization of information about construction works" is an international standard dealing with structuring of information for construction. It has two parts:
  - ISO 12006-2:2015 "Building construction - Organization of information about construction works - Part 2: Framework for classification of information"
  - ISO 12006-3:2007 "Building construction - Organization of information about construction works - Part 3: Framework for object-oriented information" also known as BuildingSMART Data Dictionary or International Framework for Dictionaries (IFD) Library.

Classification of project stages:

- inception/ procurement
- feasibility
- outline proposals, programme preparation
- scheme detail/ costing
- detail design/ costing
- production information and bills of quantities preparation
- tender action
- construction preparation
- construction operations on site
- completion
- feedback

== See also ==
- Building code
- Civil engineering
- List of ISO standards
