= Uniclass =

Construction classification system

Uniclass is a unified classification system for the construction industry. Developed in the UK but capable of use internationally, it contains consistent tables classifying items of all scales, from entire complexes such as a railway or airport to individual product items such as anchor plates, flue liners or LED lamps.

Originally released in printed form in 1997, Uniclass allowed project information to be structured to a recognised standard. The original version was later heavily revised. Uniclass2 (2013) was developed to make it more compatible with Building information modeling (BIM) processes, and further enhanced in development by NBS of the current version, known as Uniclass 2015.

== History ==
Uniclass was created by the Construction Project Information Committee (CPIC), a UK industry organisation with representatives from key institutions including the Royal Institute of British Architects (RIBA) and the Royal Institution of Chartered Surveyors (RICS). CPIC had previously published various guidance documents on efficient preparation of project specifications and production drawings, and some of the proceeds from sales of these publications contributed towards the cost of a feasibility study on a Unified Classification for the Construction Industry (abbreviated as 'Uniclass'). It was intended to supersede CI/SfB (Construction Indexing/Samarbetskommittén för Byggnadsfrågor), a classification system originally developed in Sweden and introduced to the UK by the RIBA in 1961.

A voluntary standard classification system for the construction industry, it was intended to help organise information throughout design and construction processes; a standard classification facilitates interoperability between different systems. The first edition was published in 1997 as a 215-page printed book (mainly comprising tables). The content ("Uniclass 1") was maintained in a printed form until 2013 ("Uniclass 1.4: Legacy Release"). Early versions were criticised for not being unified, for inconsistencies between the labelling and depth of its then 15 tables, for poor integration of civil engineering and building works, and for being an essentially paper-based system.

=== Uniclass2 ===
Development of Uniclass2 began before 2008, looking to create a purer classification system based on taxonomy (grouping things with similar characteristics in a hierarchal manner). It was influenced by UK adoption of ISO 12006-2, an international framework for construction information, and by parallel industry developments relating to adoption of BIM. A CPIC working group comprising representatives from the RICS Building Cost Information Service (BCIS), RICS Quantity Surveying and Construction Faculty, NBS, Autodesk, Bentley, Crossrail and Halcrow Group was established to develop Uniclass2, with NBS commissioned to deliver the first unified tables. Uniclass2 was launched in March 2013, and was made freely available online in various formats for all participants throughout the life cycle of a project.

CPIC's work on Uniclass2 stopped in 2013 and was ceded to government in 2014, after which the Technology Strategy Board (now Innovate UK) managed a contract competition to complete the Uniclass work and develop a unified multi-disciplinary Digital Plan of Work. NBS anticipated that Uniclass2 might be developed as a UK and international classification system for the construction industry. In September 2014, an NBS-led team won the £1m TSB Technology Strategy Board contract to develop a free-to-use 'Digital Toolkit for BIM' including the digital plan of work and the classification system.

=== Uniclass 2015 development ===
Led by NBS, experts from across the industry developed Uniclass 2015, extending the scope and responding to industry feedback on Uniclass 2. As part of the 'Digital Toolkit for BIM', Uniclass 2015 was launched in April 2015.

== Uniclass 2015 ==
Uniclass 2015 provides:

- a unified classification system for the construction industry - buildings, landscape and infrastructure can be classified under one unified scheme
- a hierarchical suite of tables that supported classification from a university campus or road network to a floor tile or kerb unit
- a numbering system flexible enough to accommodate future classification requirements
- a system compliant with ISO 12006 that is mapped to NRM1 (Note: NRM1 was first published in February 2009 as the RICS new rules of measurement.) and supports mapping to other classification systems, including non-UK schemes, in the future
- a free classification system that will be maintained and updated by NBS. (Note: NBS says "Uniclass is a free service. All Uniclass tables are available to download and use completely free of charge." It also says: "NBS is committed to maintaining and developing Uniclass as a free-to-use classification.")

Uniclass 2015 provides a means of structuring project information essential for the adoption of BIM. Information about a project can be generated, used and retrieved throughout the built asset life cycle.

It comprises a set of 12 tables, each accommodating a different 'class' of information. These can be used to categorise information for costing, briefing, CAD layering (consistent with ISO 13567), etc. as well as when preparing specifications or other production documents. The tables are also suitable for buildings and other assets in use, and maintaining asset management and facilities management information. The tables are updated quarterly; in April 2022, NBS was working on three new tables: Process activities, Properties and characteristics, and Materials.

=== The tables ===
The suite of tables are broadly hierarchical, and allow information about a project to be defined from the broadest view of it to the most detailed. For detailed design and construction, the main starting point are Entities, which are composed of Elements; Elements are made up of Systems which in turn contain Products.

Entities can also be described using the Spaces and Activities tables if required, and at the more general level the Complexes table contains terms that can be thought of as groupings of Entities, Activities and Spaces. The tables comprise:

- Complexes: a Complex describes a project in overall terms. It can be a private house with garden, drive, garage and tool shed, or it can be a University campus with buildings for lecturing, administration, sport, halls of residence, etc. Rail networks and airports are also examples of complexes
- Entities: Entities are discrete things like buildings, bridges, tunnels etc. They provide the areas where different activities occur
- Activities: this defines the activities to be carried out in the complex, entity or space. For example, a prison complex provides a Detention activity at a high level, but can also be broken down into individual activities like exercise, sleeping, eating, working, etc. The Activities table also includes surveys, operation and maintenance and services
- Spaces/Locations: in buildings, spaces are provided for various activities to take place. In some cases a space is only suitable for one activity, for example a kitchen, but a school hall may be used for assemblies, lunches, sports, concerts and dramas. Also classed as spaces are transport corridors that run between two locations, such as the railway between London Kings Cross to Newcastle, or the M1 from London to Leeds
- Elements and functions: elements are the main components of a structure like a bridge (foundations, piers, deck) or a building (floors, walls and roofs). Functions cover things like lighting, heating and water: general requirements that are not yet designed
- Systems: Systems are the collection of components that go together to make an element or to carry out a function. For a pitched roof, the rafters, lining, tiles, ceiling boards, insulation and ceiling finish comprise a system, or a low temperature hot water heating system is formed from a boiler, pipework, tank, radiators etc.
- Products: finally, the individual products used to construct a system can be specified, e.g. joist hangers, terrazzo tiles, gas fired boilers.

=== Using the classification system ===
The tables need to be flexible and to be able to accommodate sufficient codings to ensure coverage, to allow for a multitude of items and circumstances, including new technologies and developments that are yet to emerge.

Each code consists of either four or five pairs of characters. The initial pair identifies which table is being used and employs letters. The four following pairs represent groups, sub-groups, sections and objects. By selecting pairs of numbers, up to 99 items can be included in each group of codes, allowing plenty of scope for inclusion.

For example, Systems are arranged in groups with subgroups which are sub divided, which leads to the final object code. For instance:

- SS_30 Roof, floor and paving systems
- SS_30_10 Pitched, arched and domed roof structure systems
- SS_30_10_30 Framed roof structure systems
- SS_30_10_30_25 Heavy steel roof framing systems

or

- SS_50 Disposal systems
- SS_50_75 Wastewater storage, treatment and disposal systems
- SS_50_75_67 Primary sewage treatment and final settlement systems
- SS_50_75_67_46 Lamella tank systems
