= DIN 4420 =

DIN 4420 refers to a series of DIN standards dedicated to working and protection scaffolds. The standard is divided in the following parts:

- DIN 4420-1 - Service and working scaffolds - Part 1: Service scaffolds - Performance requirements, general design, structural design
- DIN 4420-2 - Working and protection scaffolds – Ladder scaffolds
- DIN 4420-3 - Service and working scaffolds - Part 3: Selected types of scaffolding constructions and their basic versions
- DIN 4420-4 - Working and protection scaffolds – Prefabricated scaffolds – Materials, components, dimensions, loadbearing capacity and safety requirements
