= Scaffolding =

Temporary structure used to support a work crew and materials

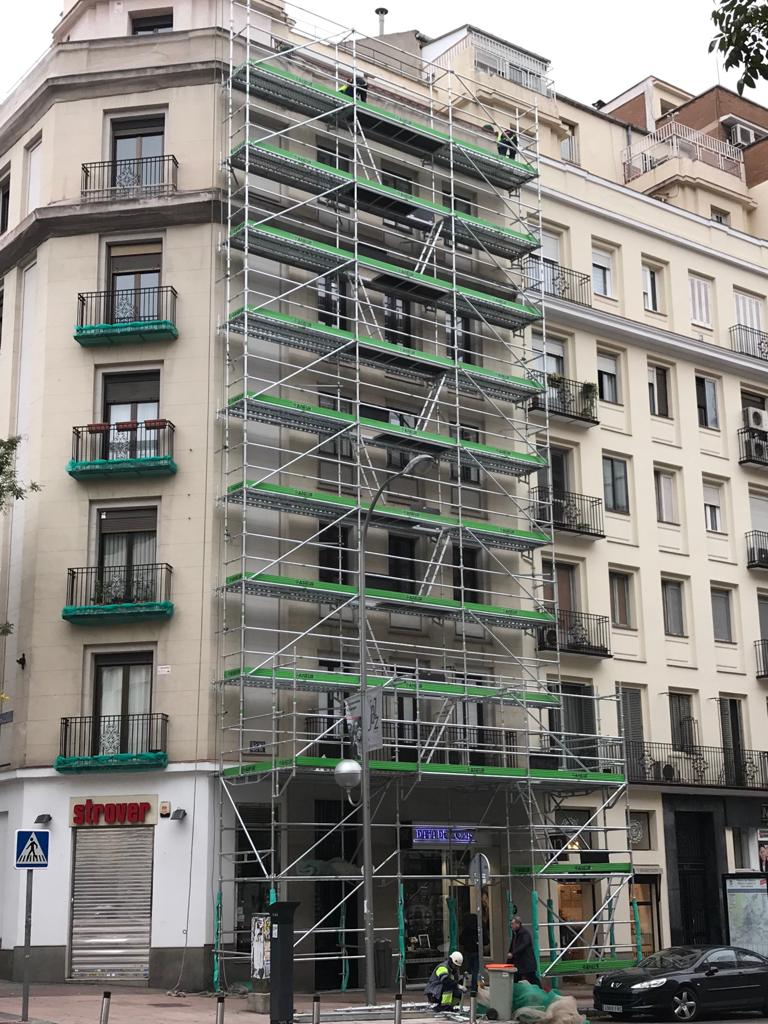
Scaffolding for rehabilitation in Madrid, Spain

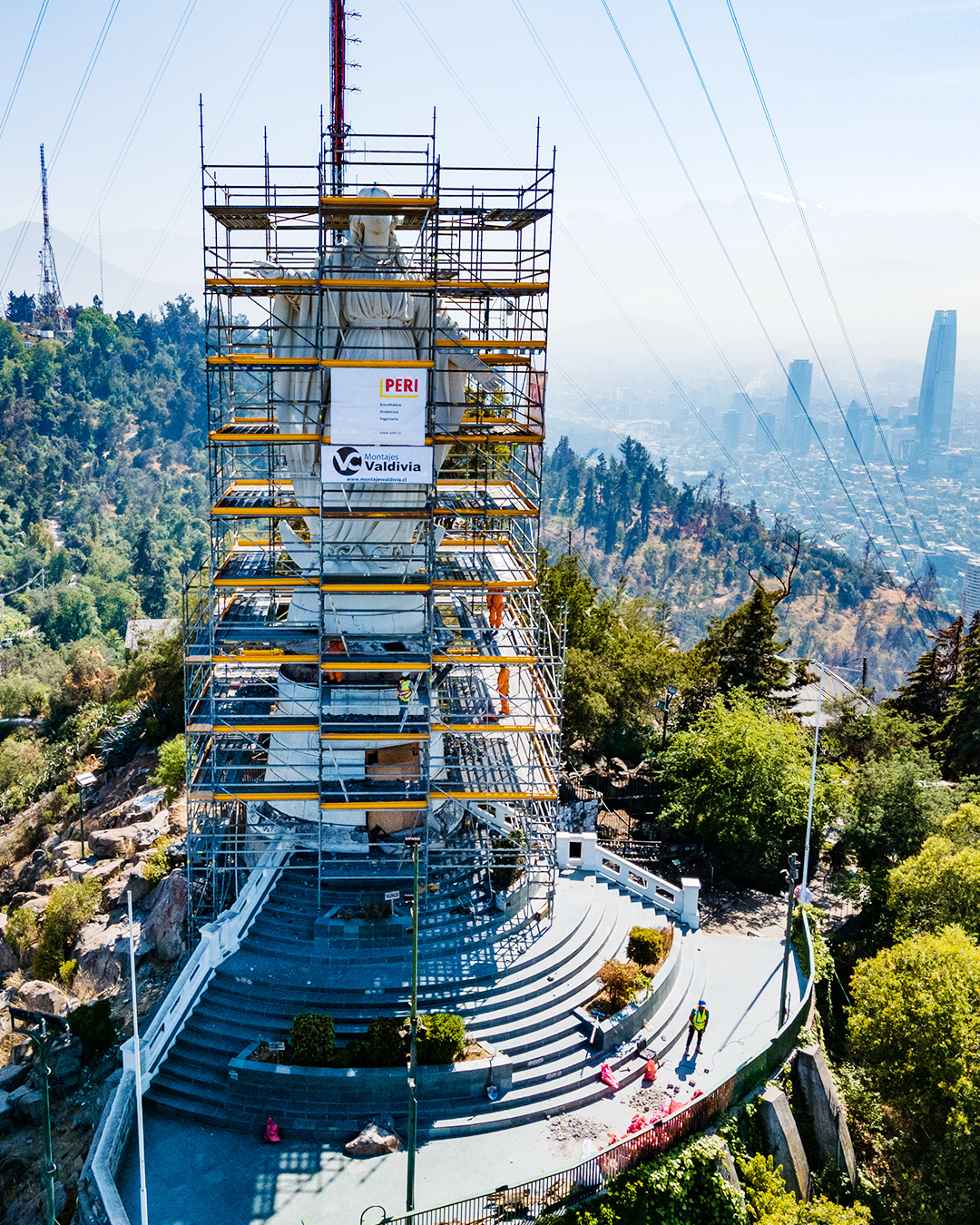
Scaffolding for renovation on the Virgin Mary statue, Santiago de Chile, Chile

Scaffolding, also called scaffold or staging, is a temporary structure used to support a work crew and materials to aid in the construction, maintenance and repair of buildings, bridges and all other human-made structures. Scaffolds are widely used on site to get access to heights and areas that would be otherwise hard to get to. Unsafe scaffolding has the potential to result in death or serious injury. Scaffolding is also used in adapted forms for formwork (such as concrete construction) and shoring (propping up buildings), grandstand seating, concert stages, access/viewing towers, exhibition stands, ski ramps, half-pipes and art projects.

There are six main types of scaffolding used worldwide today. These are tube and coupler (fitting) components, prefabricated modular system scaffold components, H-frame / façade modular system scaffolds, suspended scaffolds, timber scaffolds and bamboo scaffolds (particularly in China, India and Hong Kong). Each type is made from several components which often include:

- A base jack or plate which is a load-bearing base for the scaffold.
- The standard, the upright component with connector joins.
- The ledger, a horizontal brace.
- The transom, a horizontal cross-section load-bearing component which holds the batten, board, or decking unit.
- Brace diagonal and/or cross section bracing component.
- Batten or board decking component used to make the working platform.
- Coupler, a fitting used to join components together.
- Scaffold tie, used to tie in the scaffold to structures.
- Brackets, used to extend the width of working platforms.

Specialized components used to aid in their use as a temporary structure often include heavy duty load bearing transoms, ladders or stairway units for the ingress and egress of the scaffold, beams ladder/unit types used to span obstacles and rubbish chutes used to remove unwanted materials from the scaffold or construction project.

== History ==
=== Stone Age ===
Sockets in the walls around the Paleolithic cave paintings at Lascaux, suggest that a scaffold system was used for painting the ceiling, over 17,000 years ago.

=== Antiquity ===
The Berlin Foundry Cup depicts scaffolding in ancient Greece (early 5th century BC). Egyptians, Nubians and Chinese are also recorded as having used scaffolding-like structures to build tall buildings. Early scaffolding was made of wood and secured with rope knots.

=== Modern era ===
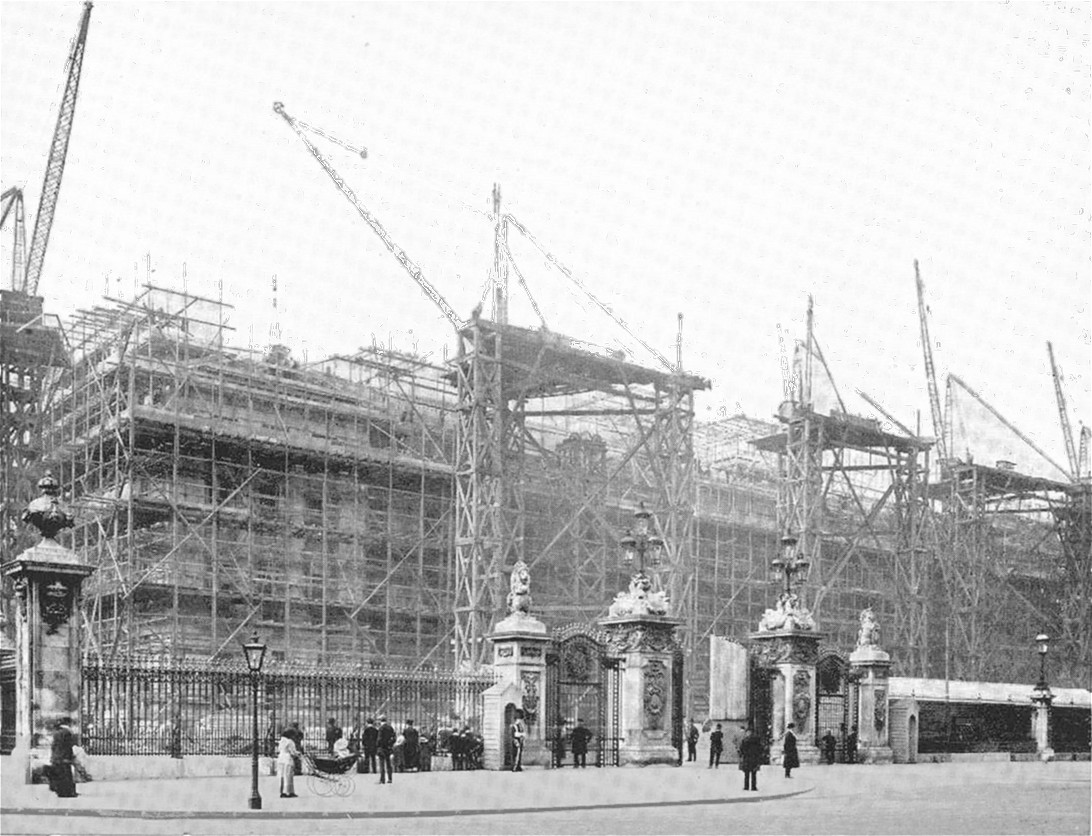
Reconstruction of Buckingham Palace in 1913, under the scaffolding of Patent Rapid

Scaffolding was erected by individual firms with wildly varying standards and sizes. The process was revolutionized by Daniel Palmer Jones and David Henry Jones. Modern day scaffolding standards, practices and processes can be attributed to these men and their companies: Rapid Scaffold Tie Company Ltd, Tubular Scaffolding Company and Scaffolding Great Britain Ltd (SGB).

David Henry Jones and Daniel Palmer Jones patented the "Scaffixer" in either 1907 or 1910, a coupling device far more robust than rope which revolutionized scaffolding construction. In 1913, his company was commissioned for the reconstruction of Buckingham Palace, during which his Scaffixer gained much publicity. Palmer-Jones followed this up with the improved "Universal Coupler" in 1919 - this soon became the industry standard coupling and has remained so to this day.

Advancements in metallurgy throughout the early 20th century saw the introduction of tubular steel water pipes (instead of timber poles) with standardized dimensions, allowing for the industrial interchangeability of parts and improving the structural stability of the scaffold. The use of diagonal bracings also helped to improve stability, especially on tall buildings. The first frame system was brought to market by SGB in 1944 and was used extensively for the postwar reconstruction.

== Today ==
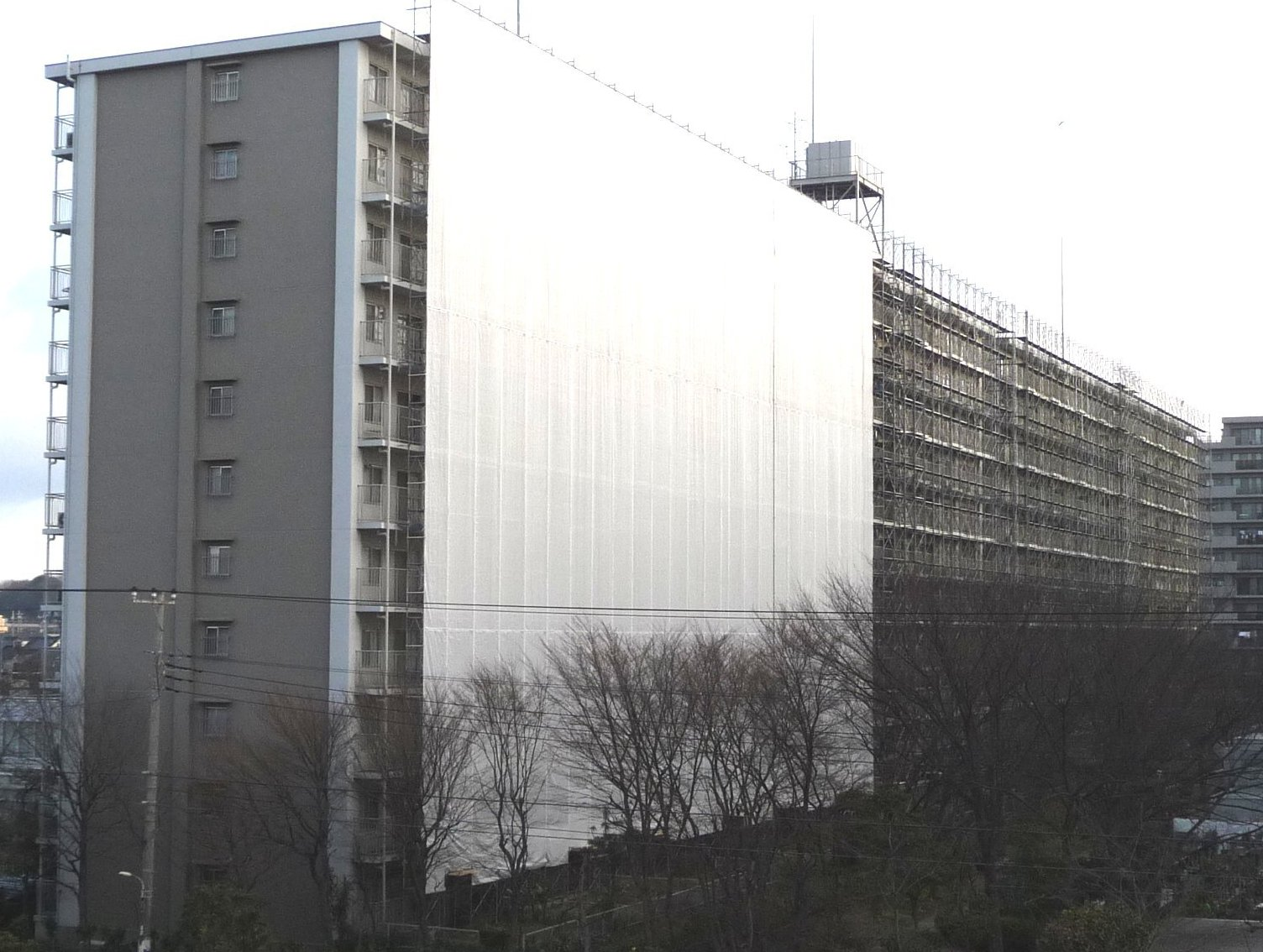
A condominium in periodical (every 10-15 years) large scale repairing/maintenance in Japan under regulation. In most cases the entire building is covered by steel scaffolding and mesh for easy work and safety. Typically it continues 3-5 weeks per planned schedule.

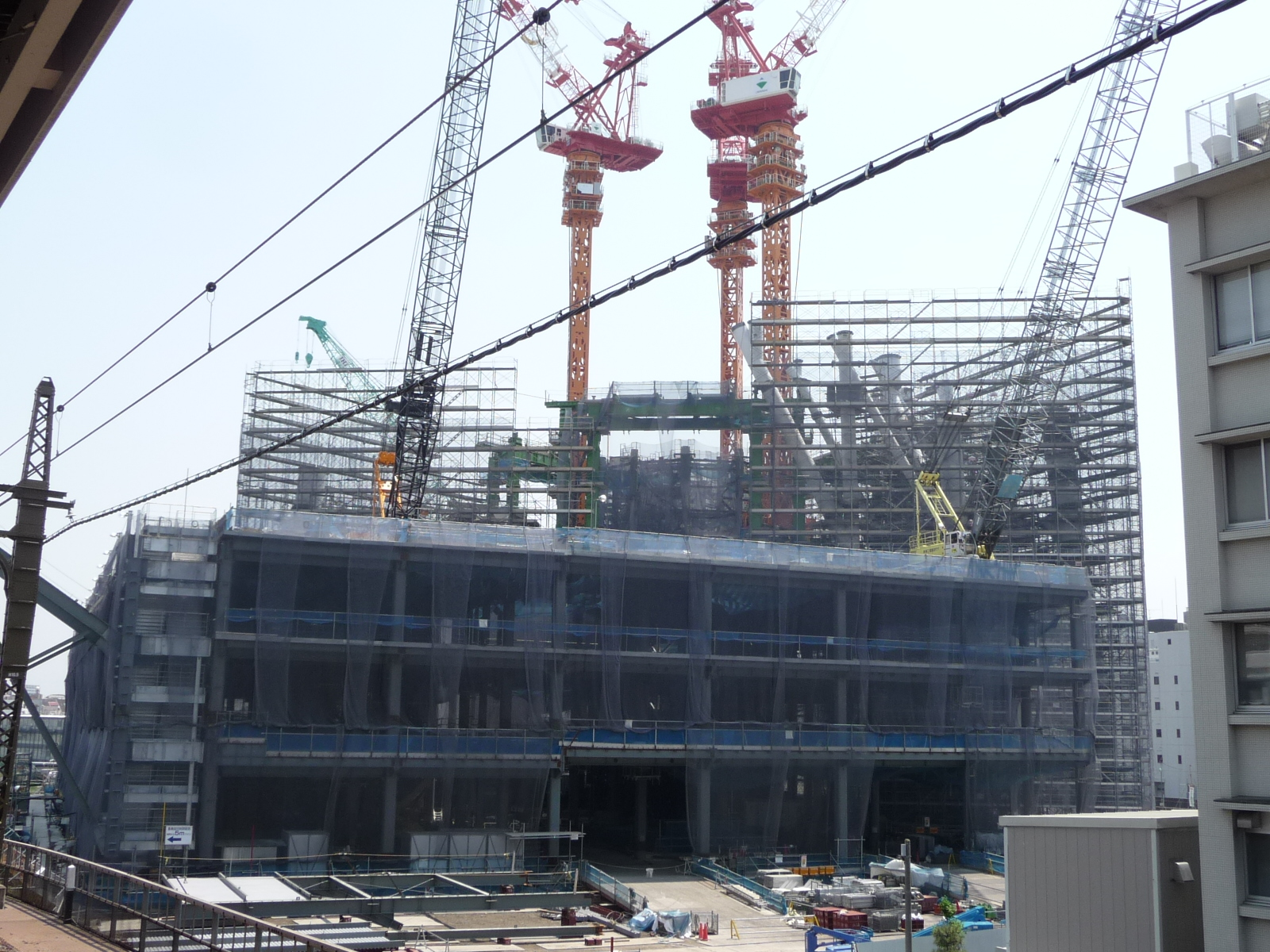
Scaffolding, 10 months after construction of the Tokyo Skytree started

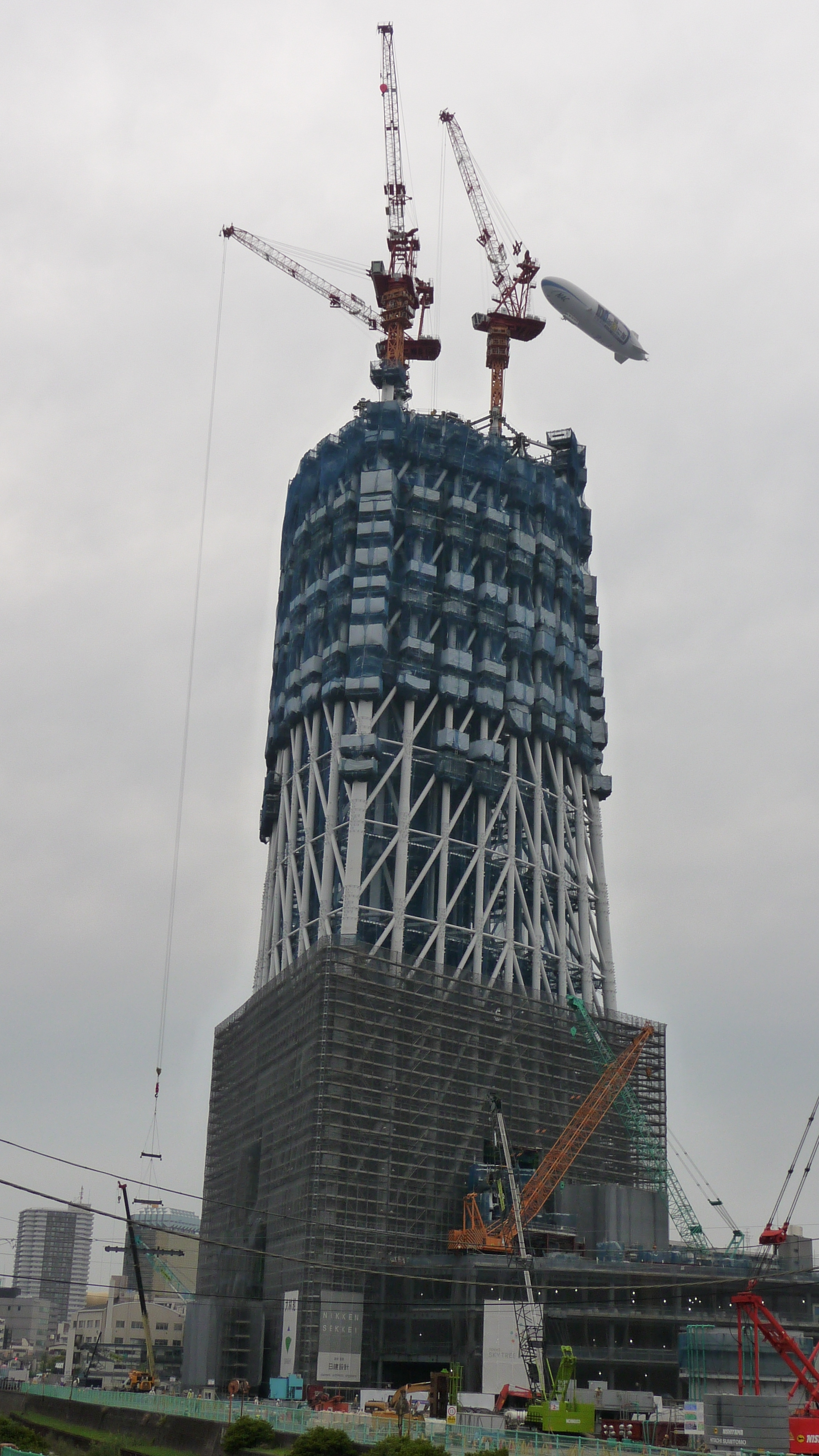
Scaffolding, 14 months after construction of the Tokyo Skytree started. The lower part of the entire tower is surrounded with scaffolding, and in the upper part each X shaped tower structure covered a number of scaffolding.

The European Standard, BS EN 12811-1, specifies performance requirements and methods of structural and general design for access and working scaffolds. Requirements given are for scaffold structures that rely on the adjacent structures for stability. In general these requirements also apply to other types of working scaffolds.

The purpose of a working scaffold is to provide a safe working platform and access suitable for work crews to carry out their work. The European Standard sets out performance requirements for working scaffolds. These are substantially independent of the materials of which the scaffold is made. The standard is intended to be used as the basis for enquiry and design.

=== Materials ===
The basic components of scaffolding are tubes, couplers and boards.

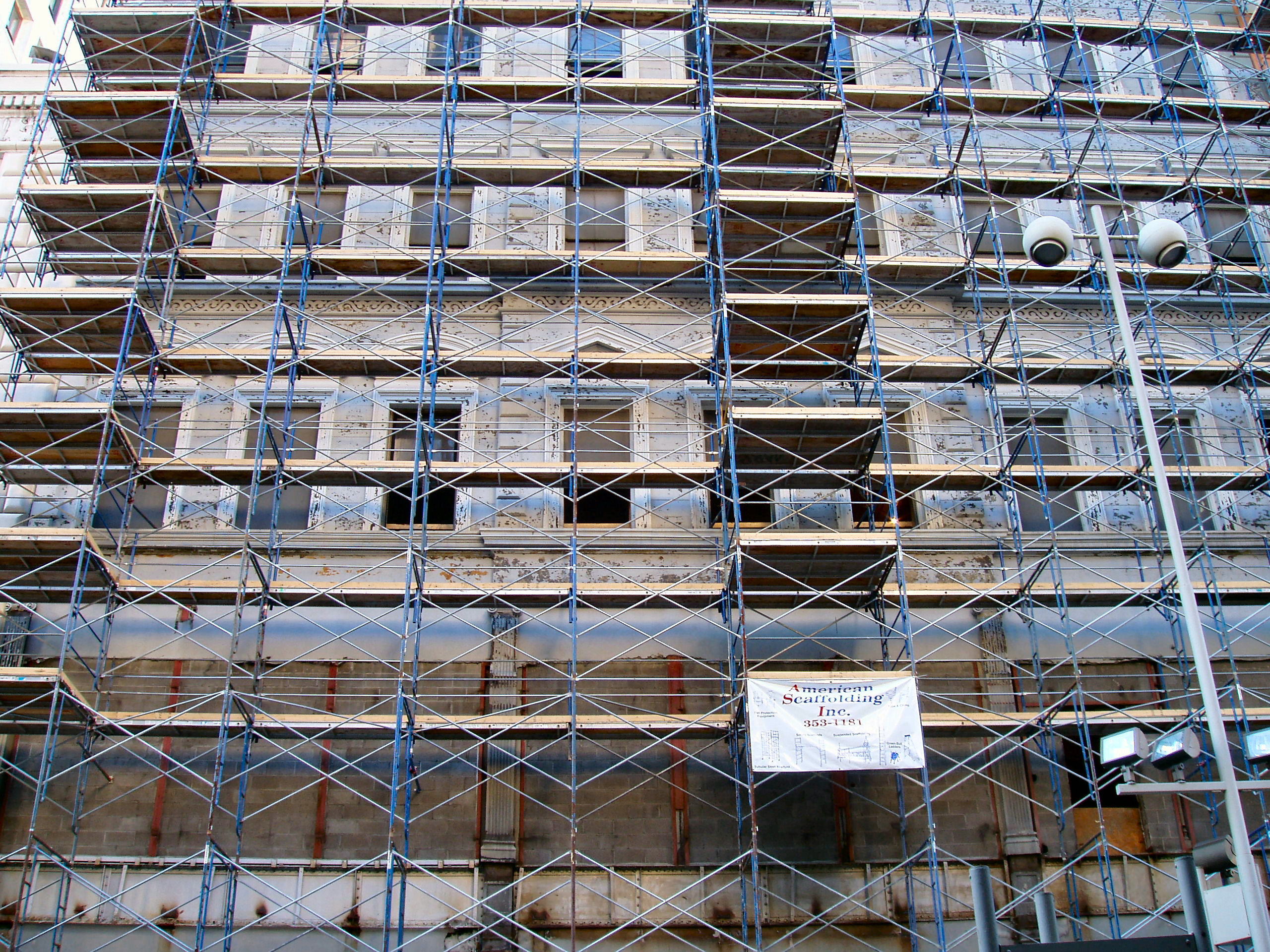
Extensive scaffolding on a building in downtown Cincinnati, Ohio. This type of scaffolding is called pipe staging.

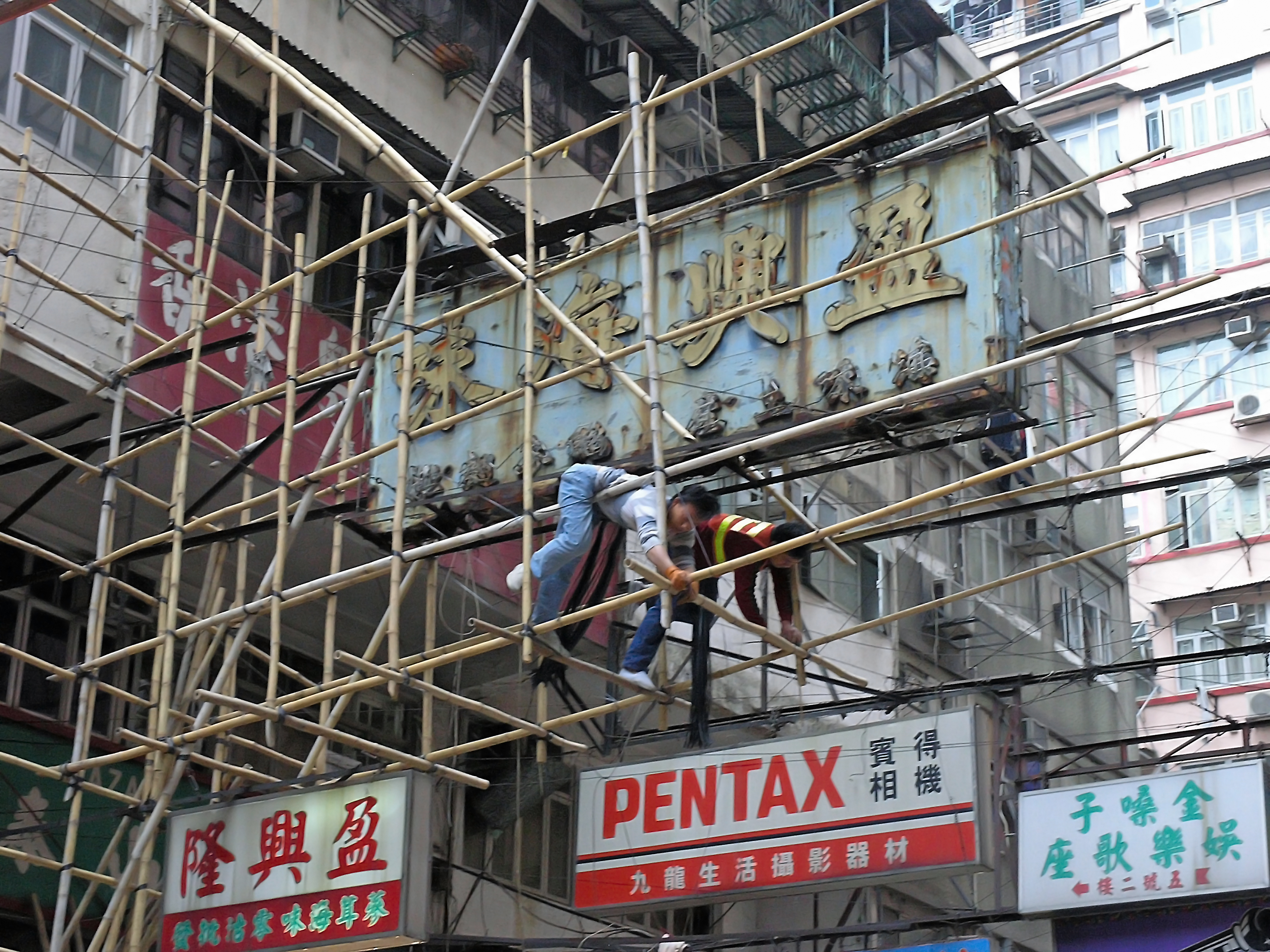
Assembly of bamboo scaffolding cantilevered over a Hong Kong street

The basic lightweight tube scaffolding that became the standard and revolutionised scaffolding, becoming the baseline for decades, was invented and marketed in the mid-1950s. With one basic 24 pound unit a scaffold of various sizes and heights could be assembled easily by a couple of labourers without the nuts or bolts previously needed.

Tubes are usually made either of steel or aluminium. Composite scaffolding uses filament-wound tubes of glass fibre in a nylon or polyester matrix. Because of the high cost of composite tube, it is usually only used when there is a risk from overhead electric cables that cannot be isolated. Steel tubes are either 'black' or galvanised. The tubes come in a variety of lengths and a standard outside diameter of 48.3 mm. (1.5 NPS pipe). The chief difference between the two types of metal tubes is the lower weight of aluminium tubes (1.7 kg/m as opposed to 4.4 kg/m). Aluminium tube is more flexible and has a lower resistance to stress. Tubes are generally bought in 6.3 m lengths and can then be cut down to certain typical sizes. Most large companies will brand their tubes with their name and address in order to deter theft.

Boards provide a working surface for scaffold users. They are seasoned wood and come in three thicknesses (38 mm (usual), 50 mm and 63 mm) are a standard width (225 mm) and are a maximum of 3.9 m long. The board ends are protected either by metal plates called hoop irons or sometimes nail plates, which often have the company name stamped into them. Timber scaffold boards in the UK should comply with the requirements of BS 2482. As well as timber, steel or aluminium decking is used, as well as laminate boards. In addition to the boards for the working platform, there are sole boards which are placed beneath the scaffolding if the surface is soft or otherwise suspect, although ordinary boards can also be used. Another solution, called a scaffpad, is made from a rubber base with a base plate moulded inside; these are desirable for use on uneven ground since they adapt, whereas sole boards may split and have to be replaced.

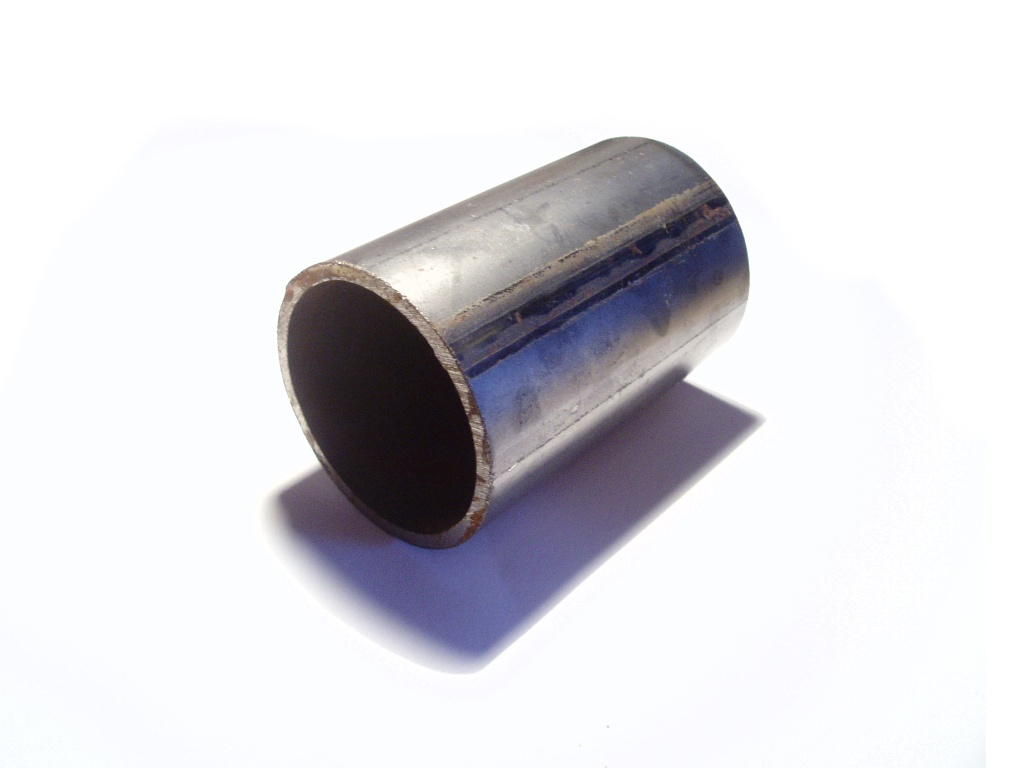
A short section of steel scaffold tube

Couplers are the fittings which hold the tubes together. The most common are called scaffold couplers, and there are three basic types: right-angle couplers, putlog couplers and swivel couplers. To join tubes end-to-end joint pins (also called spigots) or sleeve couplers are used. Only right angle couplers and swivel couplers can be used to fix tube in a 'load-bearing connection'. Single couplers are not load-bearing couplers and have no design capacity.

Other common scaffolding components include base plates, ladders, ropes, anchor ties, reveal ties, gin wheels, sheeting, etc. Most companies will adopt a specific colour to paint the scaffolding with, in order that quick visual identification can be made in case of theft. All components that are made from metal can be painted but items that are wooden should never be painted as this could hide defects. Despite the metric measurements given, many scaffolders measure tubes and boards in imperial units, with tubes from 21 feet down and boards from 13 ft down.

Bamboo scaffolding is widely used in Hong Kong and Macau, with nylon straps tied into knots as couplers. In India, bamboo or other wooden scaffolding is also mostly used, with poles being lashed together using ropes made from coconut hair (coir).

=== Basic scaffolding ===
The key elements of the scaffolding are the standard, ledger and transoms. The standards, also called uprights, are the vertical tubes that transfer the entire weight of the structure to the ground where they rest on a square base plate to spread the load. The base plate has a shank in its centre to hold the tube and is sometimes pinned to a sole board. Ledgers are horizontal tubes which connect between the standards. Transoms rest upon the ledgers at right angles. Main transoms are placed next to the standards, they hold the standards in place and provide support for boards; intermediate transoms are those placed between the main transoms to provide extra support for boards. In Canada this style is referred to as "English". "American" has the transoms attached to the standards and is used less but has certain advantages in some situations.

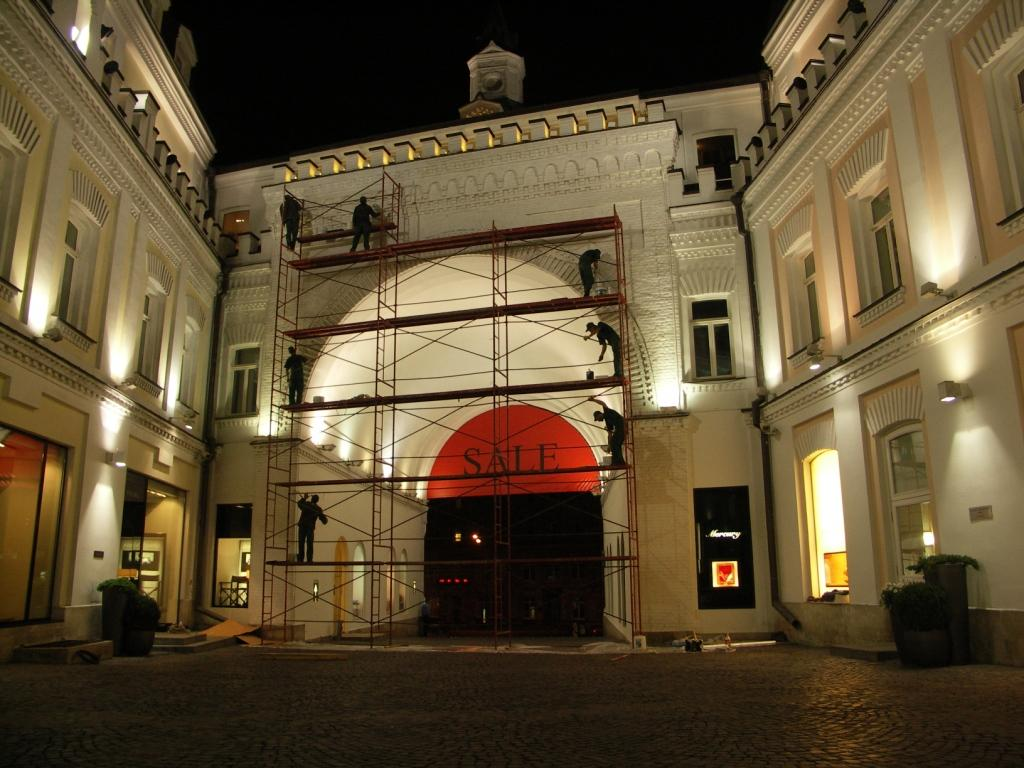
Scaffolding in Tretyakovsky Proyezd, Moscow

As well as the tubes at right angles there are cross braces to increase rigidity, these are placed diagonally from ledger to ledger, next to the standards to which they are fitted. If the braces are fitted to the ledgers they are called ledger braces. To limit sway a facade brace is fitted to the face of the scaffold every 30 metres or so at an angle of 35°-55° running right from the base to the top of the scaffold and fixed at every level.

Of the couplers previously mentioned, right-angle couplers join ledgers or transoms to standards, putlog or single couplers join board bearing transoms to ledgers - Non-board bearing transoms should be fixed using a right-angle coupler. Swivel couplers are to connect tubes at any other angle. The actual joints are staggered to avoid occurring at the same level in neighbouring standards.

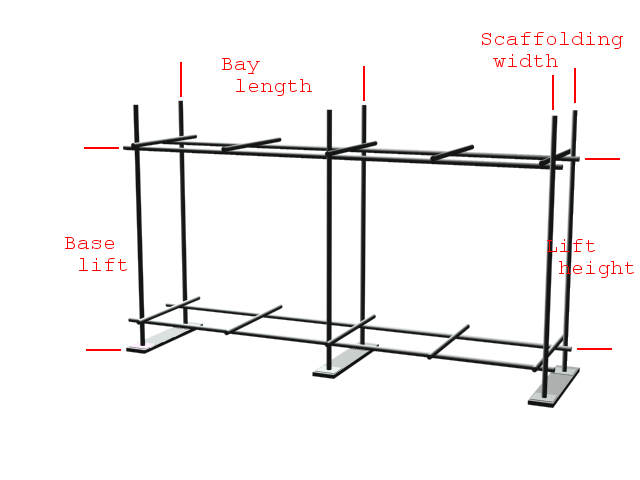
Basic scaffold dimensioning terms. No boards, bracing or couplers shown.

The spacings of the basic elements in the scaffold are fairly standard. For a general purpose scaffold the maximum bay length is 2.1 m, for heavier work the bay size is reduced to 2 or even 1.8 m while for inspection a bay width of up to 2.7 m is allowed.

The width of a scaffold platform is determined by the number and size of the boards used. A minimum platform width of 600 mm is required in many regions, including the European Union, the United Arab Emirates, and India. However, a more typical four-board scaffold would have a platform width of approximately 870 mm from standard to standard. More heavy-duty scaffolding can require 5, 6 or even up to 8 boards width. Often an inside board is added to reduce the gap between the inner standard and the structure.

The lift height, the spacing between ledgers, is 2 m, although the base lift can be up to 2.7 m. The diagram above also shows a kicker lift, which is just 150 mm or so above the ground.

Transom spacing is determined by the thickness of the boards supported, 38 mm boards require a transom spacing of no more than 1.2 m while a 50 mm board can stand a transom spacing of 2.6 m and 63 mm boards can have a maximum span of 3.25 m. The minimum overhang for all boards is 50 mm and the maximum overhang is no more than 4x the thickness of the board.

=== Foundations ===
Good foundations are essential. Often scaffold frameworks will require more than simple base plates to safely carry and spread the load. Scaffolding can be used without base plates on concrete or similar hard surfaces, although base plates are always recommended. For surfaces like pavements or tarmac base plates are necessary. For softer or more doubtful surfaces sole boards must be used, beneath a single standard a sole board should be at least 1,000 square centimetres (160 in^{2}) with no dimension less than 220 millimetres (8.7 in), the thickness must be at least 35 millimetres (1.4 in). For heavier duty scaffold much more substantial baulks set in concrete can be required. On uneven ground steps must be cut for the base plates, a minimum step size of around 450 millimetres (18 in) is recommended. A working platform requires certain other elements to be safe. They must be close-boarded, have double guard rails and toe and stop boards. Safe and secure access must also be provided.

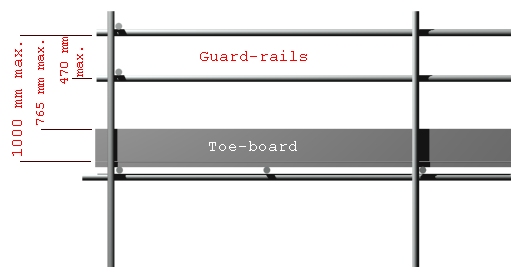
Scaffolding showing required protection of a working platform with maximum dimensions. Butt-board not visible. No couplers shown.

=== Ties ===
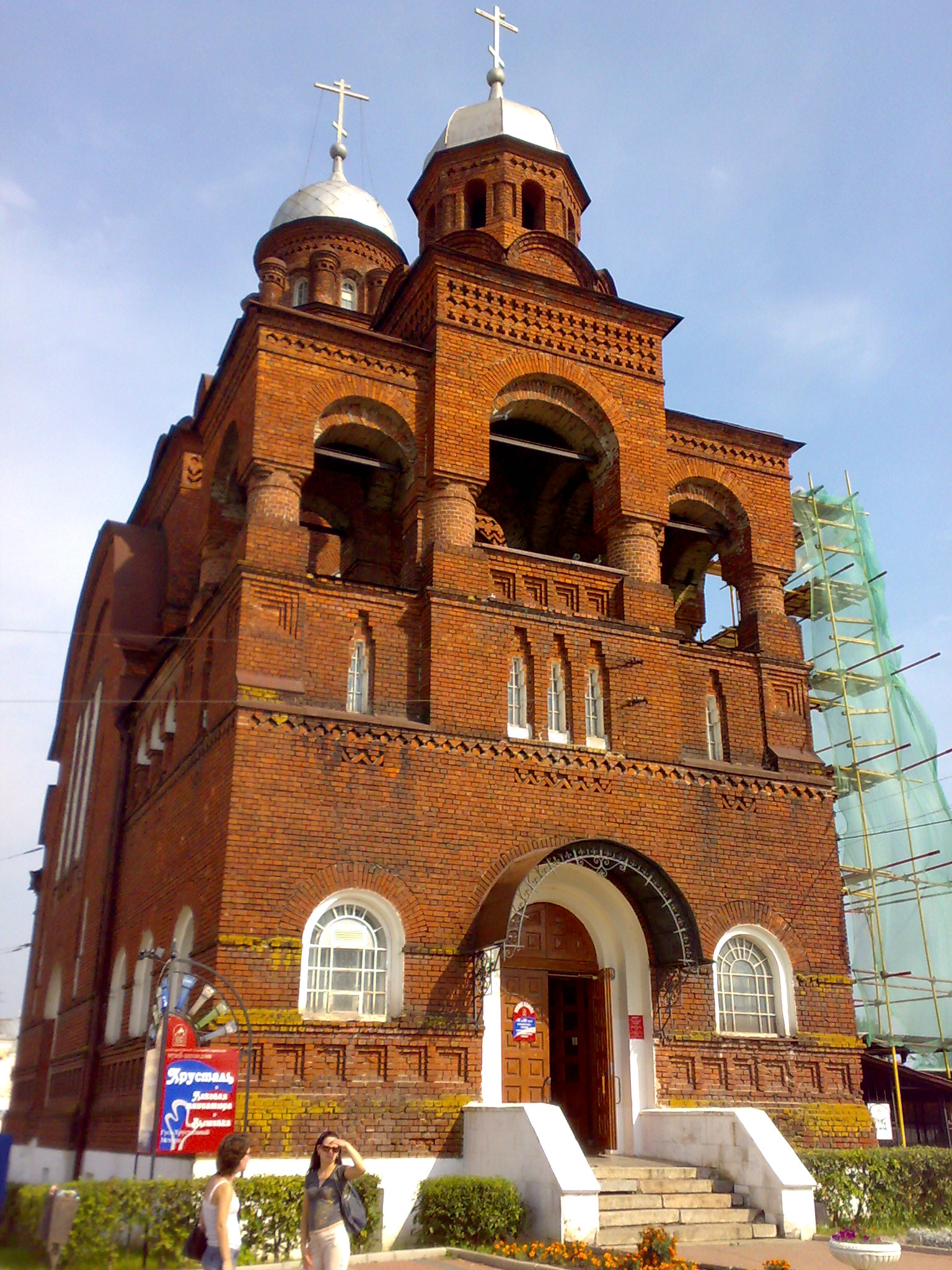
The Holy Trinity Church in Vladimir, with scaffolding wrapped in safety mesh

Scaffolds are only rarely independent structures. To provide stability for a scaffolding (at left) framework ties are generally fixed to the adjacent building/fabric/steelwork.

General practice is to attach a tie every 4 m on alternate lifts (traditional scaffolding). Prefabricated System scaffolds require structural connections at all frames - i.e. 2–3 m centres (tie patterns must be provided by the System manufacturer/supplier). The ties are coupled to the scaffold as close to the junction of standard and ledger (node point) as possible. Due to recent regulation changes, scaffolding ties must support ± loads (tie/butt loads) and lateral (shear) loads.

Due to the different nature of structures there is a variety of different ties to take advantage of the opportunities.

Through ties are put through structure openings such as windows. A vertical inside tube crossing the opening is attached to the scaffold by a transom and a crossing horizontal tube on the outside called a bridle tube. The gaps between the tubes and the structure surfaces are packed or wedged with timber sections to ensure a solid fit.

Box ties are used to attach the scaffold to suitable pillars or comparable features. Two additional transoms are put across from the lift on each side of the feature and are joined on both sides with shorter tubes called tie tubes. When a complete box tie is impossible a l-shaped lip tie can be used to hook the scaffold to the structure, to limit inward movement an additional transom, a butt transom, is placed hard against the outside face of the structure.

Sometimes it is possible to use anchor ties (also called bolt ties), these are ties fitted into holes drilled in the structure. A common type is a ring bolt with an expanding wedge which is then tied to a node point.

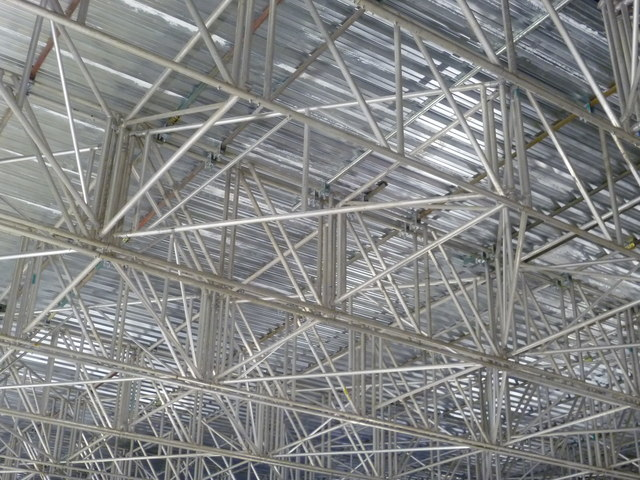
Scaffolding by Balfour & Beatty during refurbishment of the Waverley Station roof, Edinburgh 2011

The least 'invasive' tie is a reveal tie. These use an opening in the structure but use a tube wedged horizontally in the opening. The reveal tube is usually held in place by a reveal screw pin (an adjustable threaded bar) and protective packing at either end. A transom tie tube links the reveal tube to the scaffold. Reveal ties are not well regarded, they rely solely on friction and need regular checking so it is not recommended that more than half of all ties be reveal ties.

If it is not possible to use a safe number of ties rakers can be used. These are single tubes attached to a ledger extending out from the scaffold at an angle of less than 75° and securely founded. A transom at the base then completes a triangle back to the base of the main scaffold.

== Specialty scaffolding ==
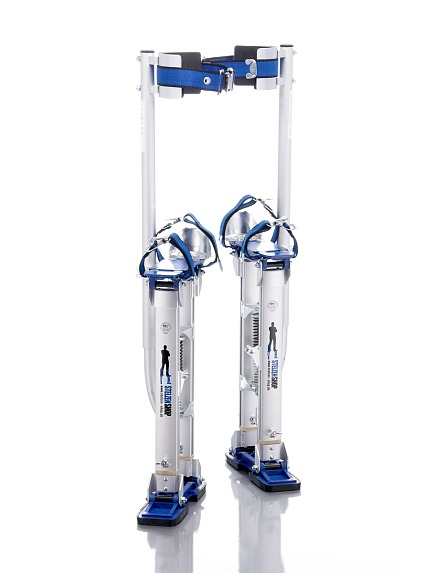
Stilts are considered a type of scaffold by OSHA in the USA. Stilts are commonly used by drywall tapers working on ceilings.

Types of scaffolding covered by the Occupational Health and Safety Administration in the United States include the following categories: Pole; tube and coupler; fabricated frame (tubular welded frame scaffolds); plasterers’, decorators’, and large area scaffolds; bricklayers' (pipe); horse; form scaffolds and carpenters’ bracket scaffolds; roof brackets; outrigger; pump jacks; ladder jacks; window jacks; crawlingboards (chicken ladders); step, platform, and trestle ladder scaffolds; single-point adjustable suspension; two-point adjustable suspension (swing stages); multipoint adjustable suspension; stonesetters’ multipoint adjustable suspension scaffolds, and masons’ multipoint adjustable suspension scaffolds; catenary; float (ship); interior hung; needle beam; multilevel suspended; mobile; repair bracket scaffolds; and stilts.

=== Gallery of scaffold types ===
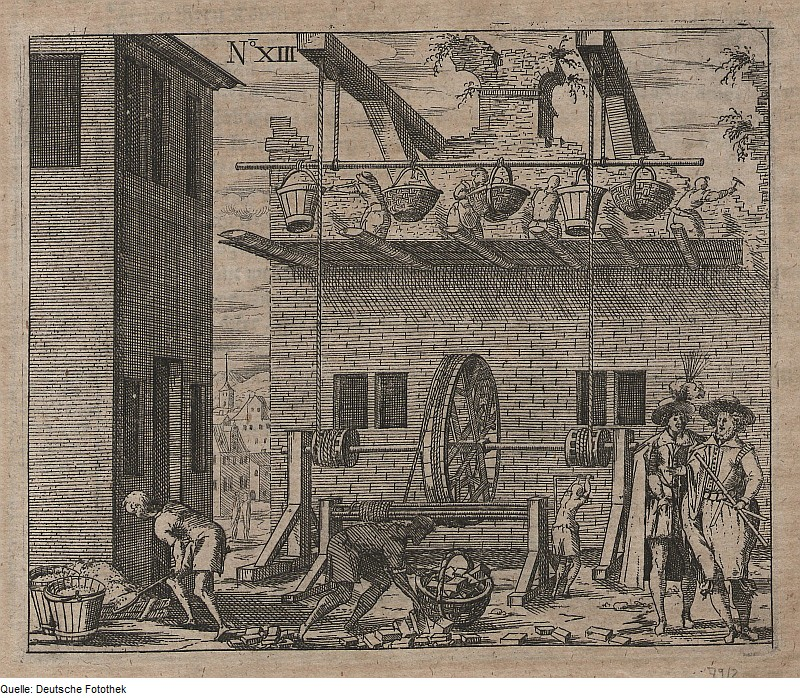
A type of putlog scaffold where the putlogs go through the wall and are relatively balanced on each side, 1612

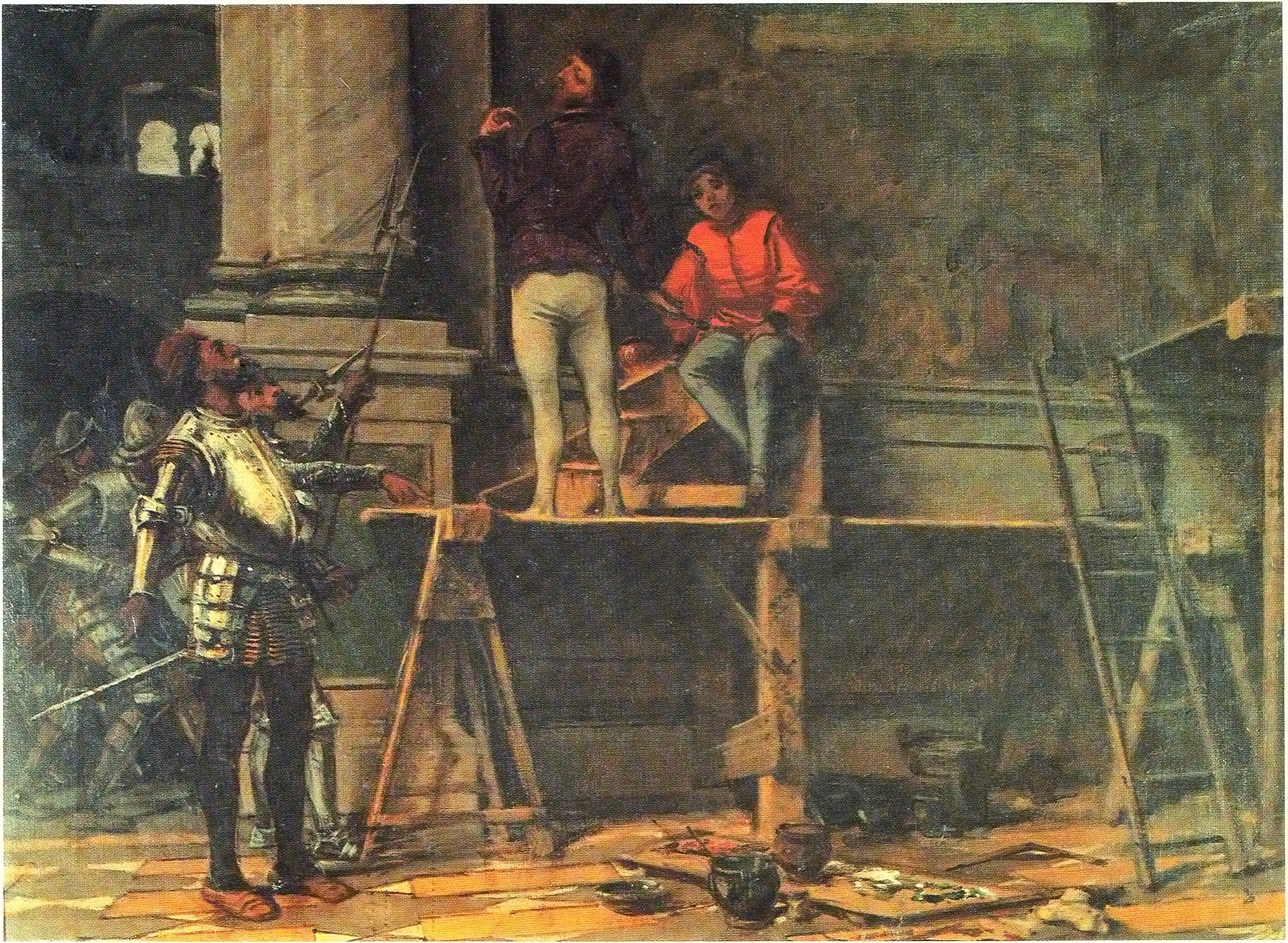
A tall horse scaffold, c. 1850s

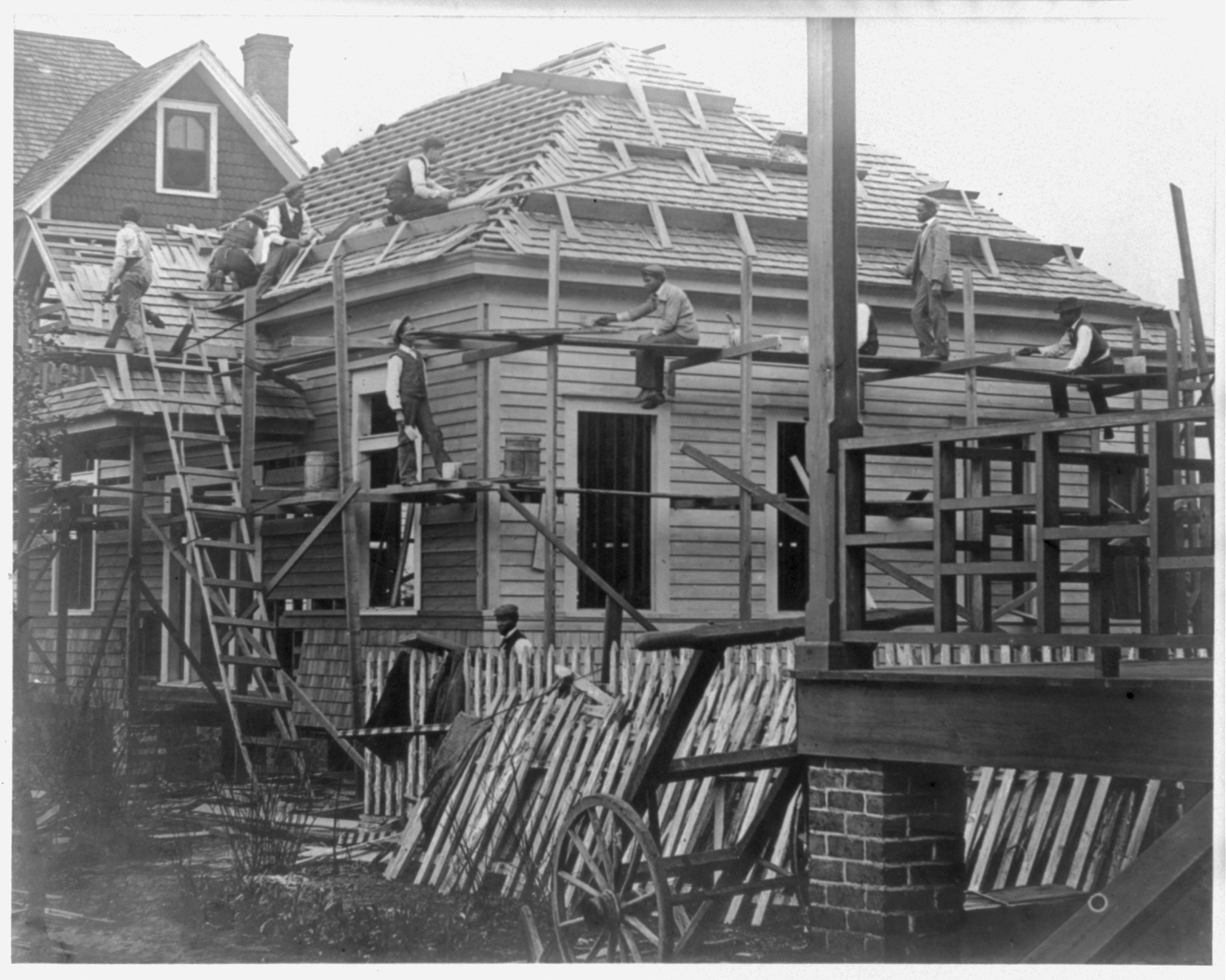
A simple putlog type scaffolding and roof brackets, 1899

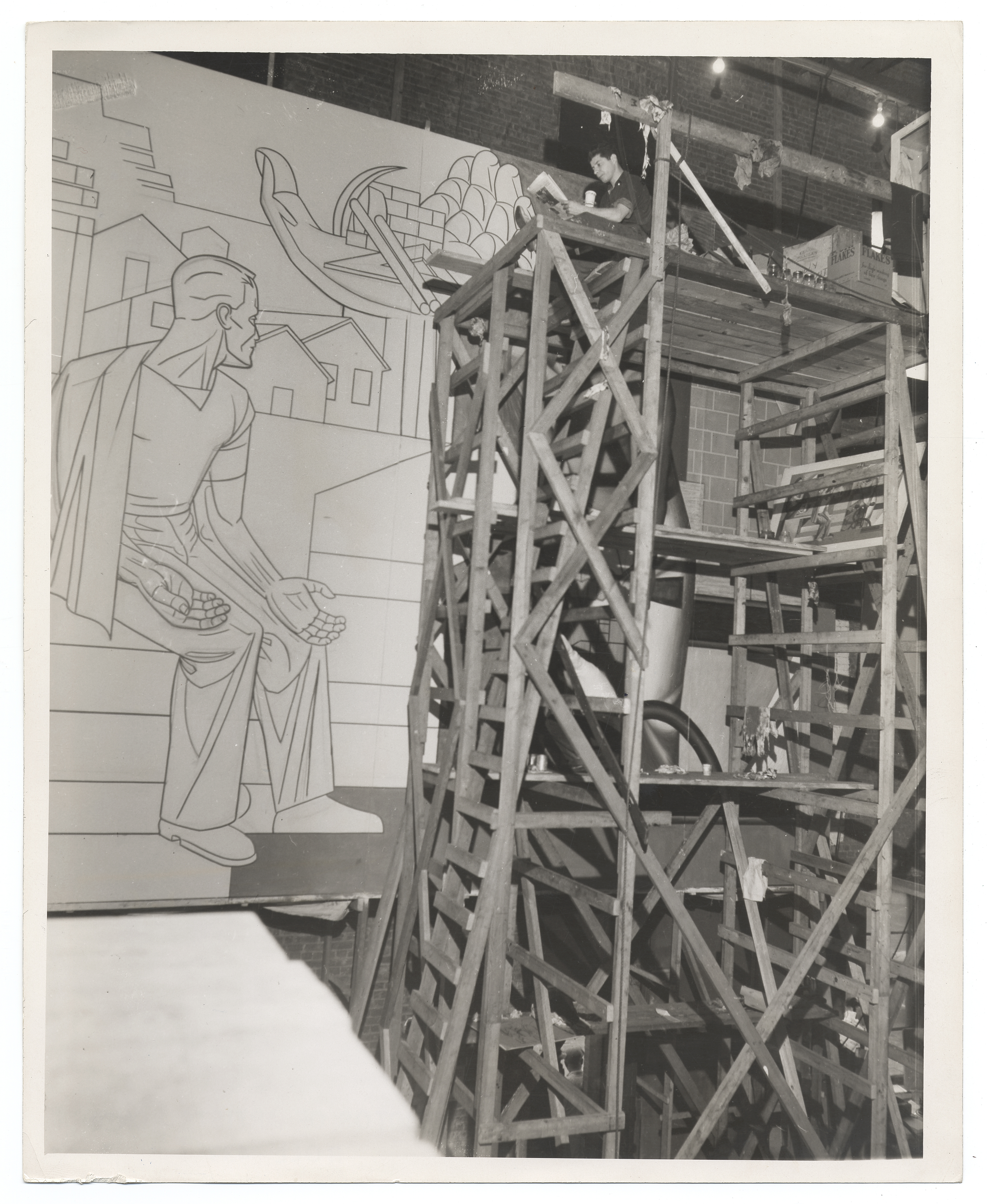
Seymour Fogel's 1939 scaffolding, for mural art purposes

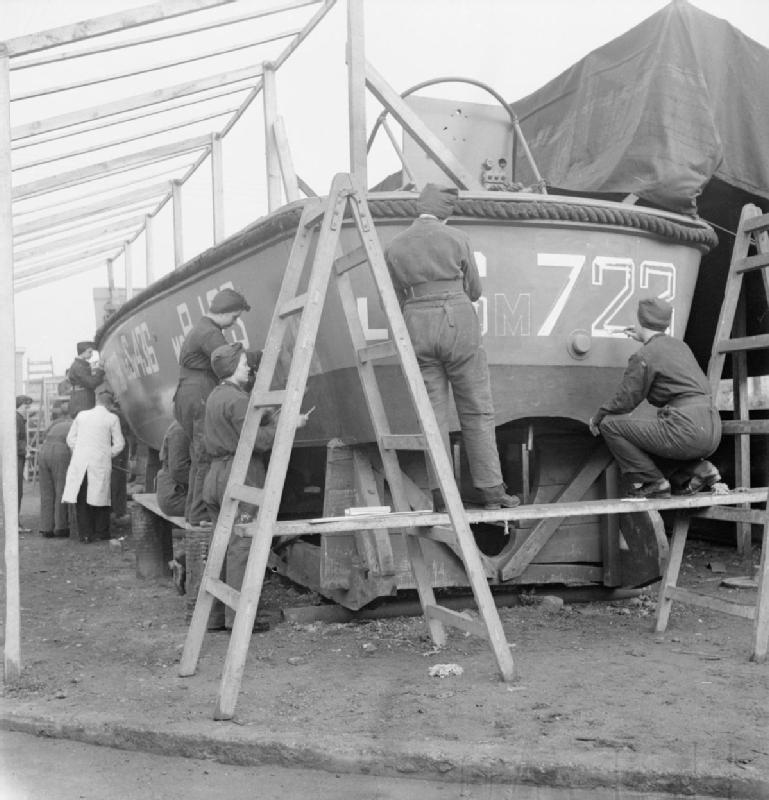
Trestle ladder scaffold, 1943

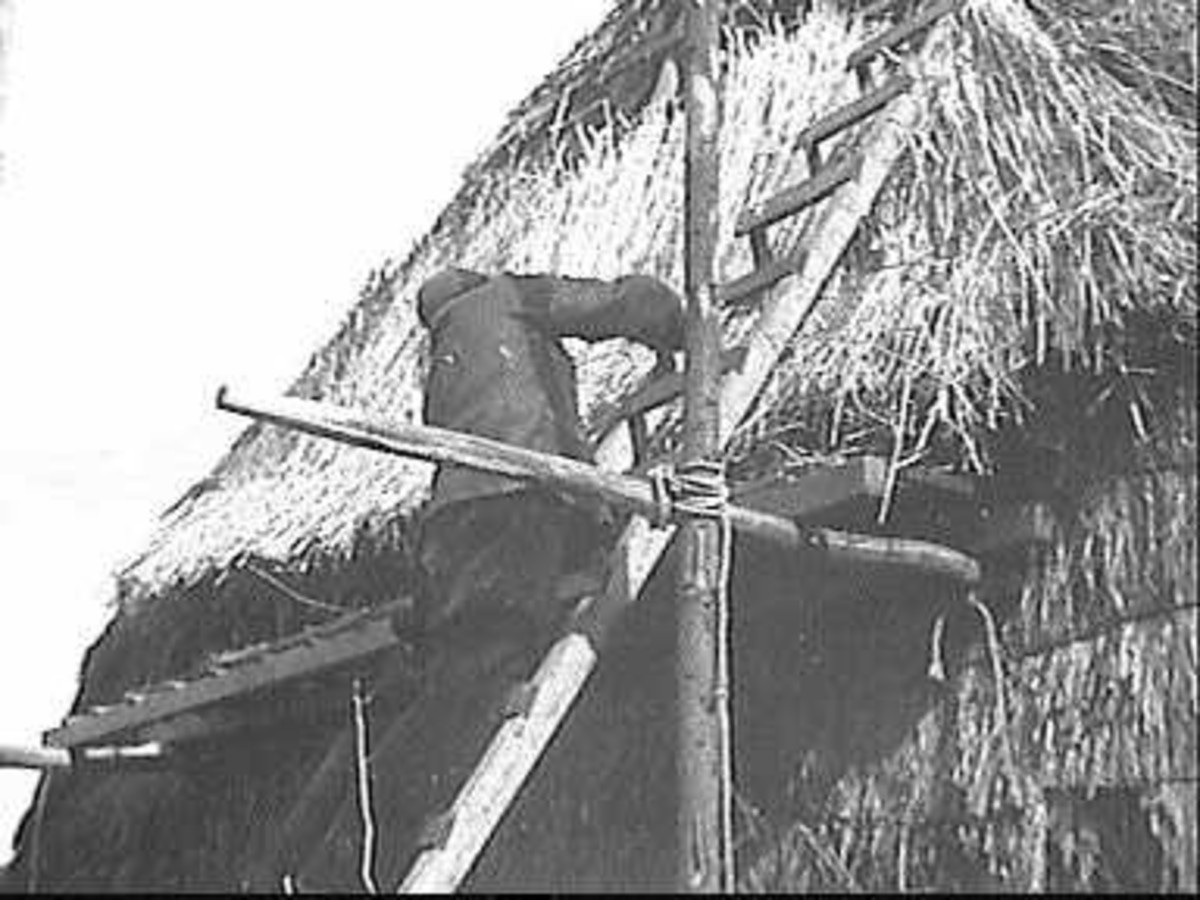
The putlog is the horizontal piece on which the platform rests, the upright pole is called a standard. In some masonry buildings the holes into which the putlogs are inserted remain unfilled and are called putlog holes, 1944.

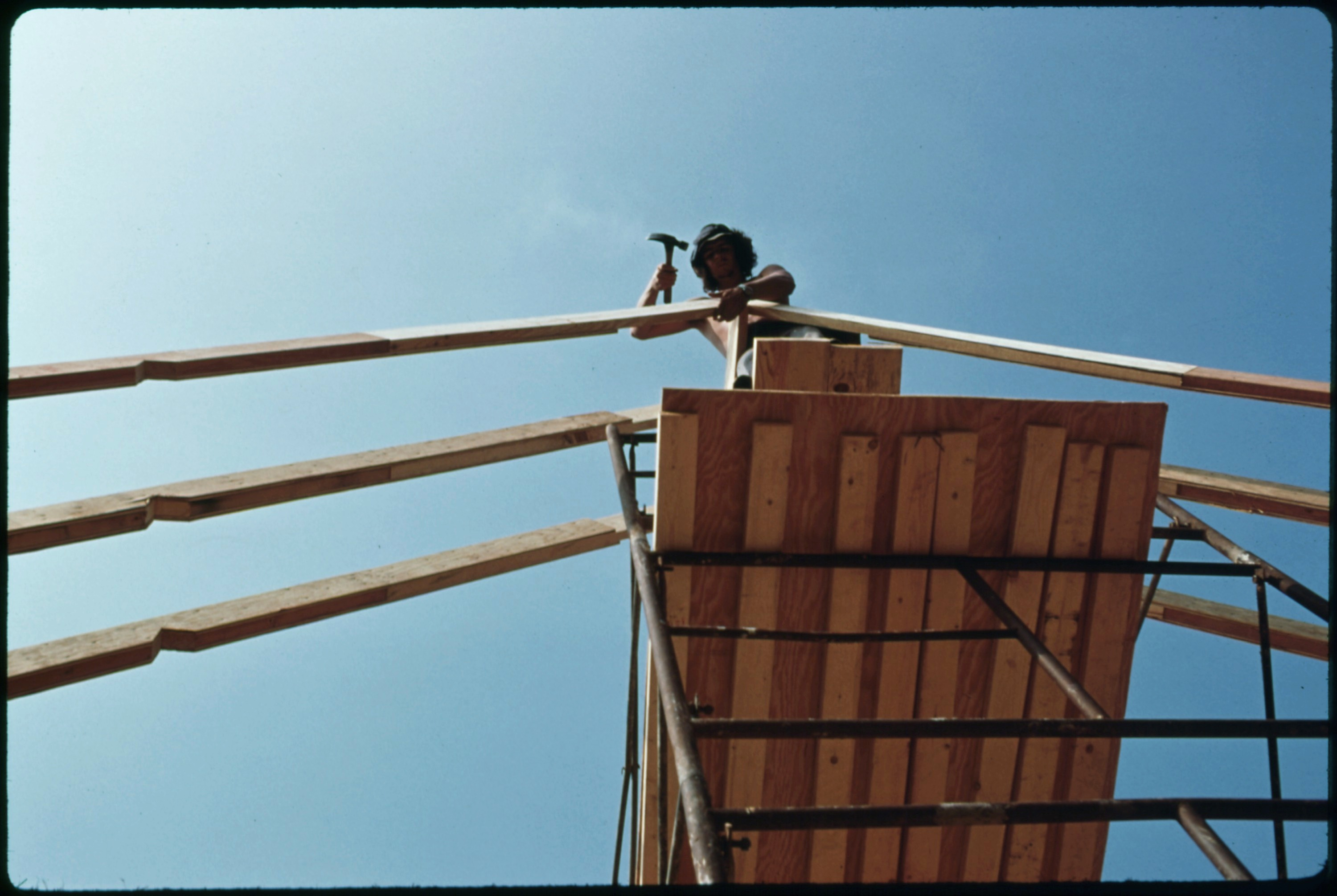
Pipe staging is very common in the U.S. Welded sections stack on top of each other and braced with cross braces, workers stand on planks or aluminum platforms, 1975.

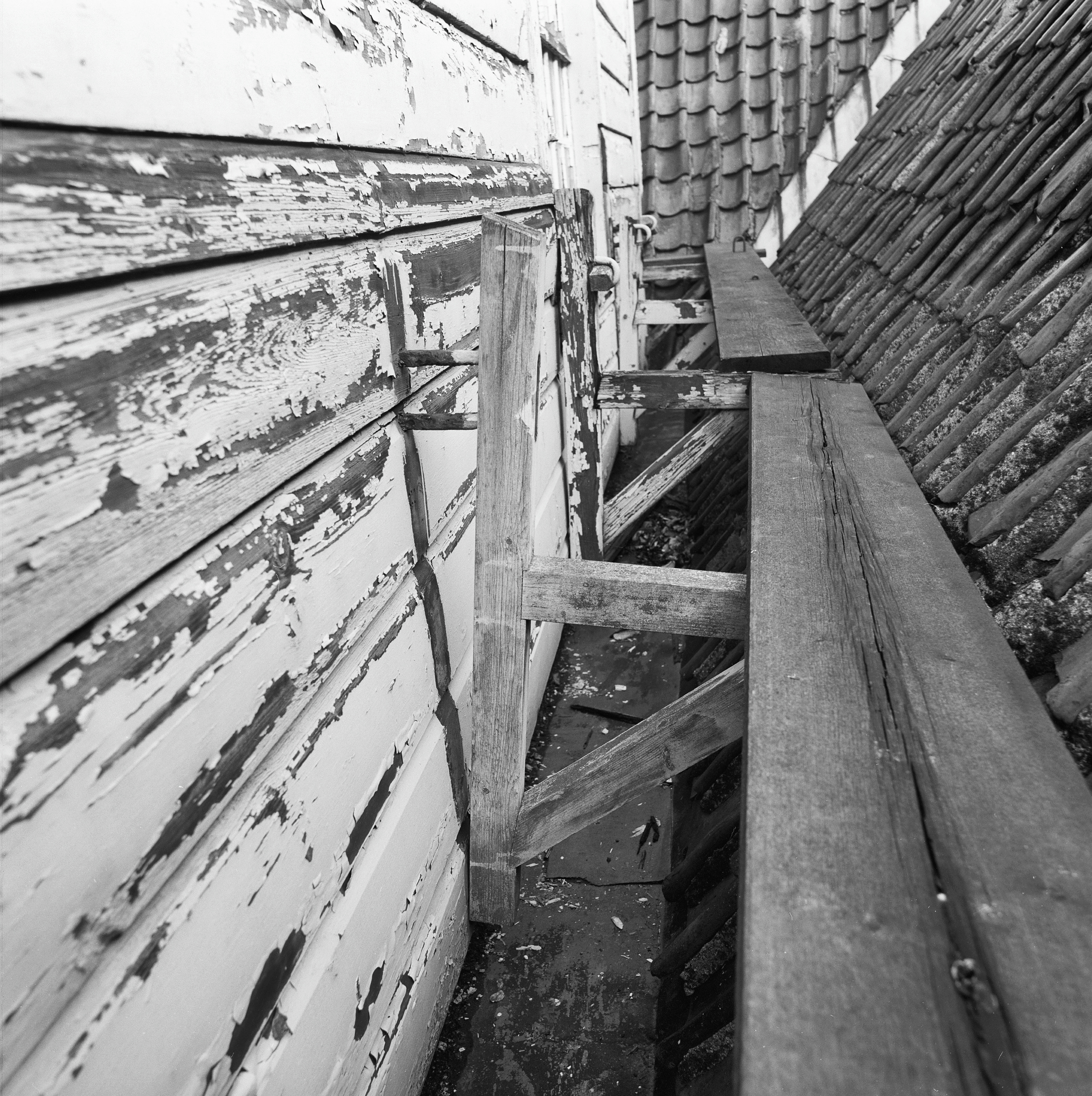
Carpenters' bracket scaffolding or wall brackets bolt through, and hang from, a wall, 1986

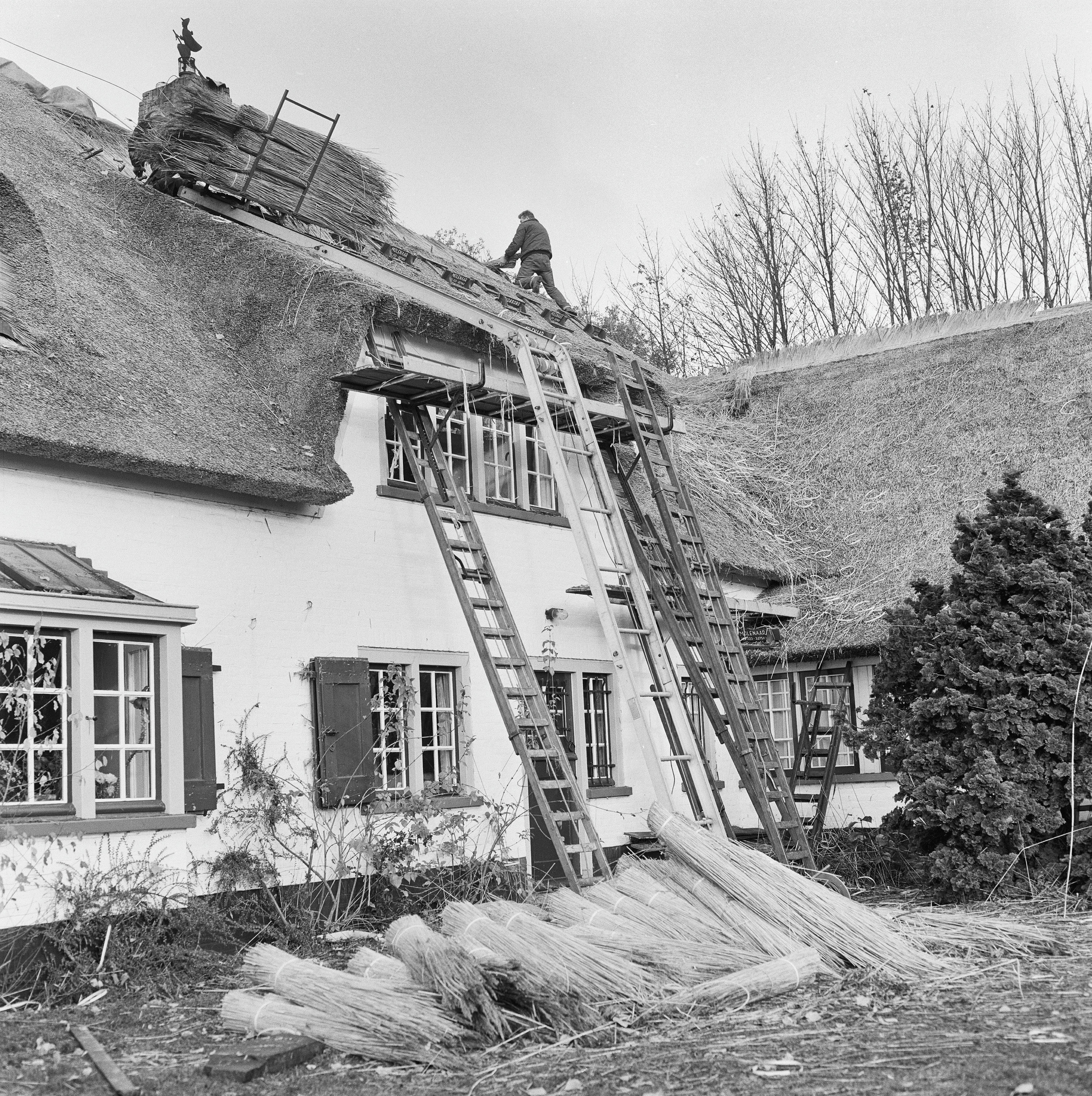
Ladder brackets mount to the rungs of a ladder and hold planks, 1989

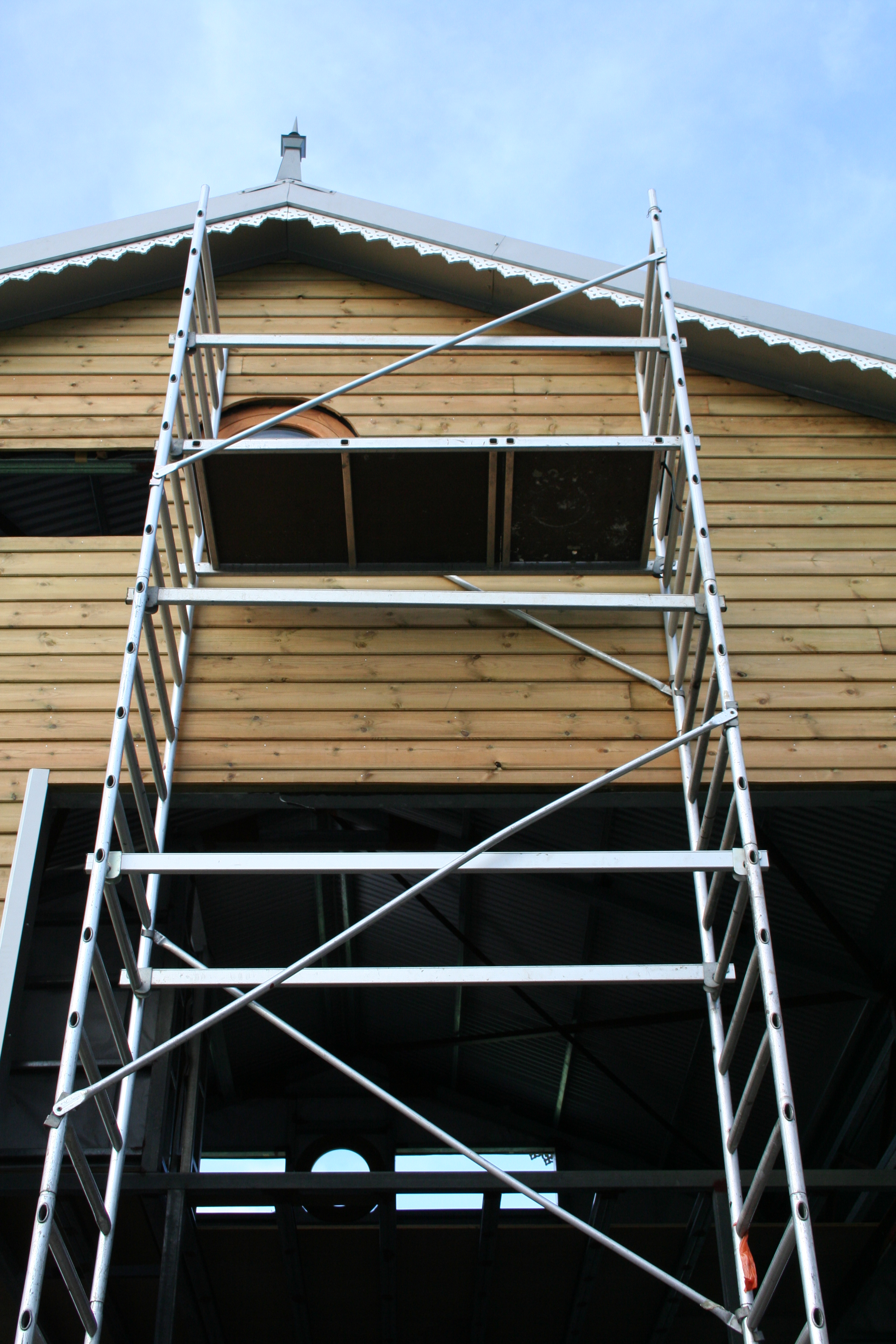
A type of metal pole scaffold in France, 2006

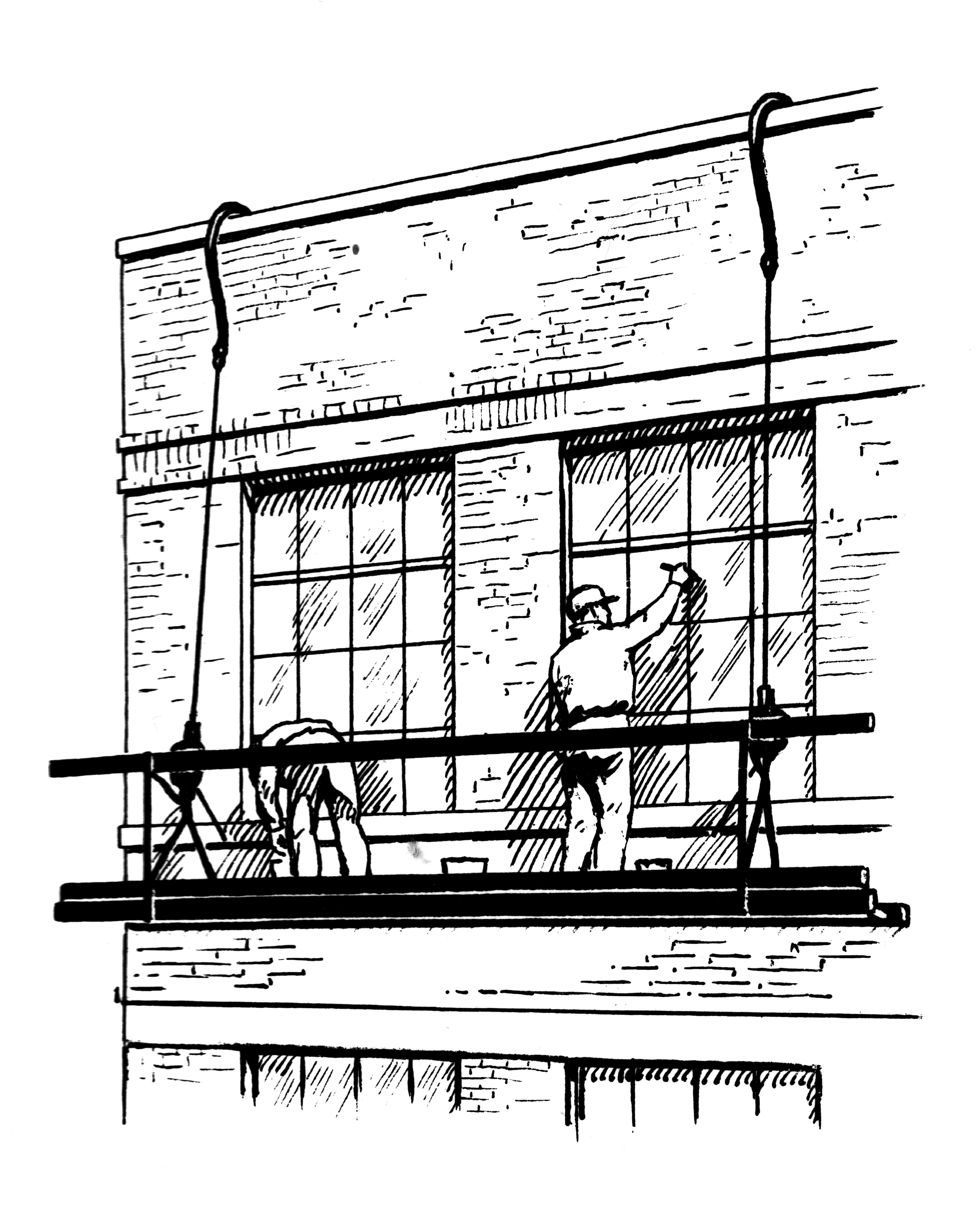
Swing stage, 2007 illustration

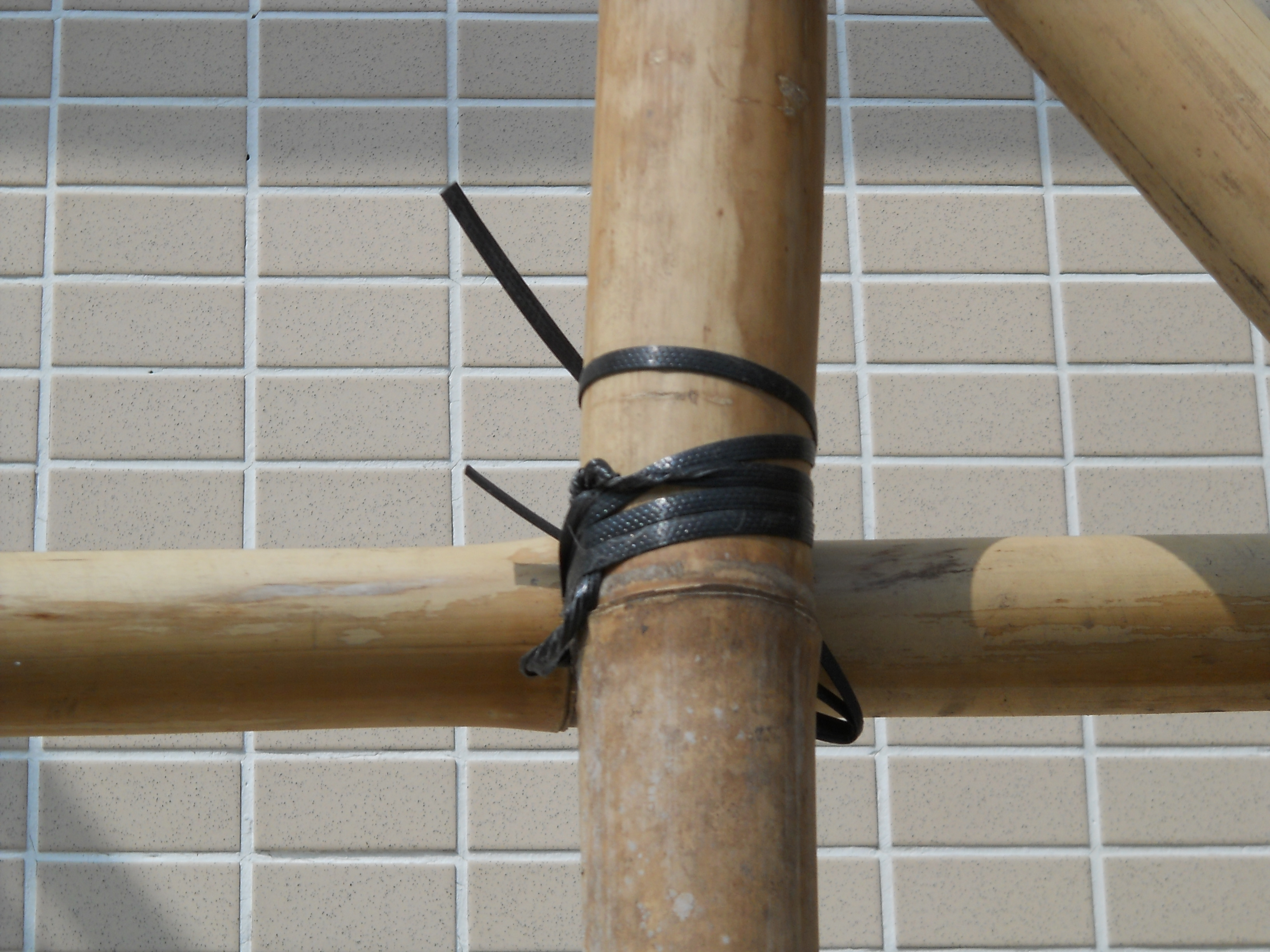
Bamboo scaffold with nylon knots, 2010

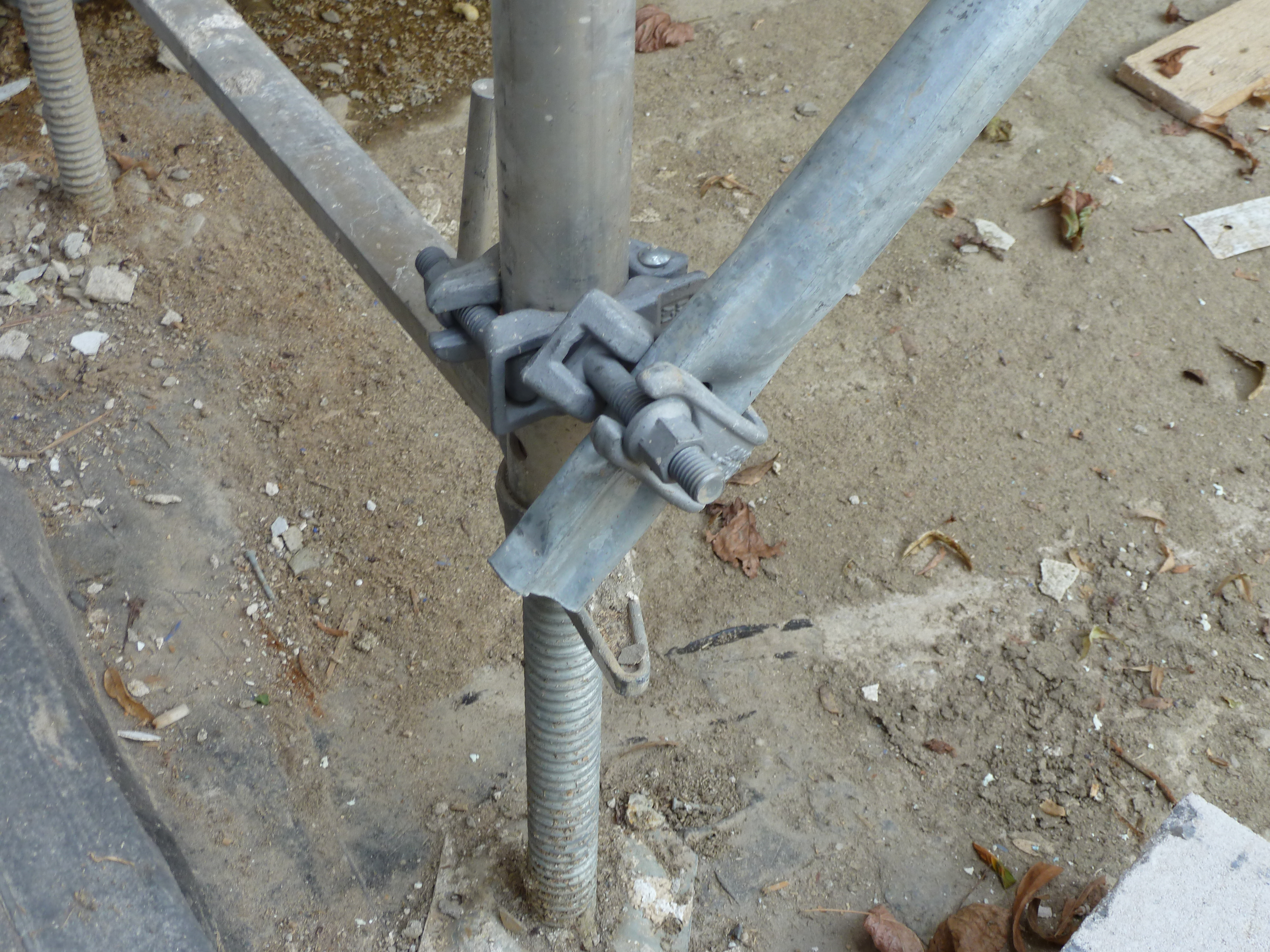
Tube and clamp scaffold detail, 2011

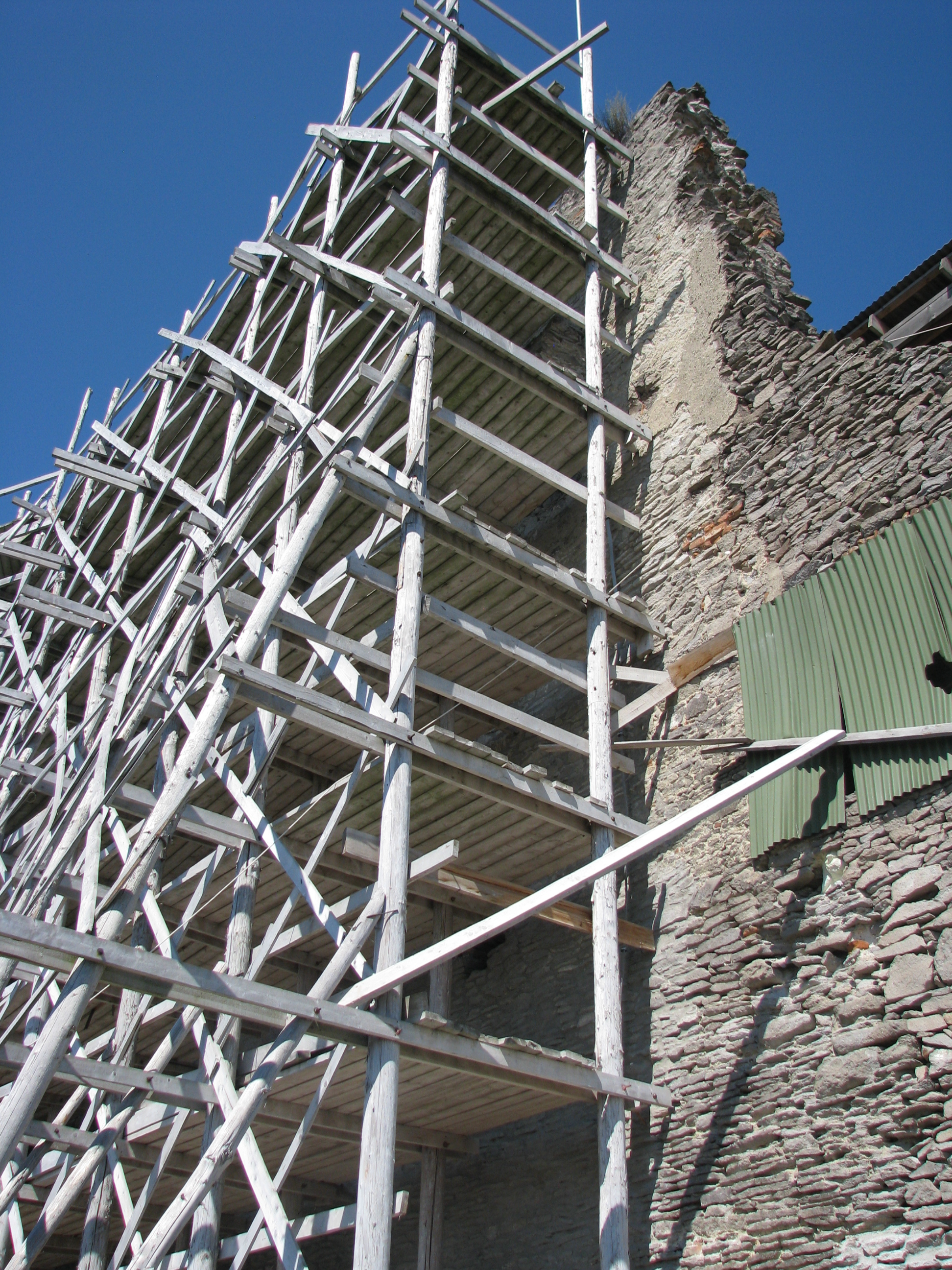
Wooden pole scaffold, 2011

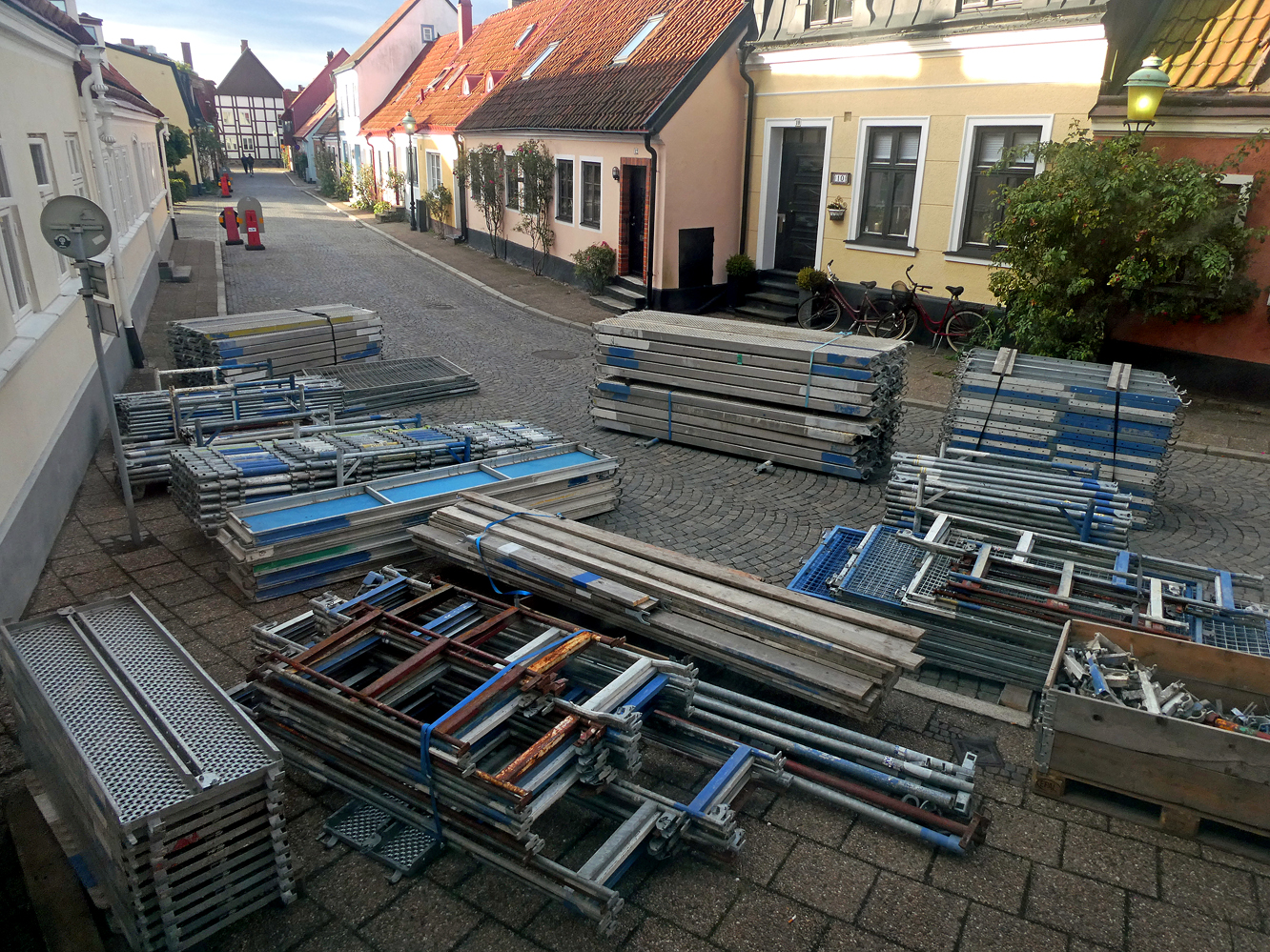
A scaffolding ready to be assembled, 2020

=== Putlog scaffold ===
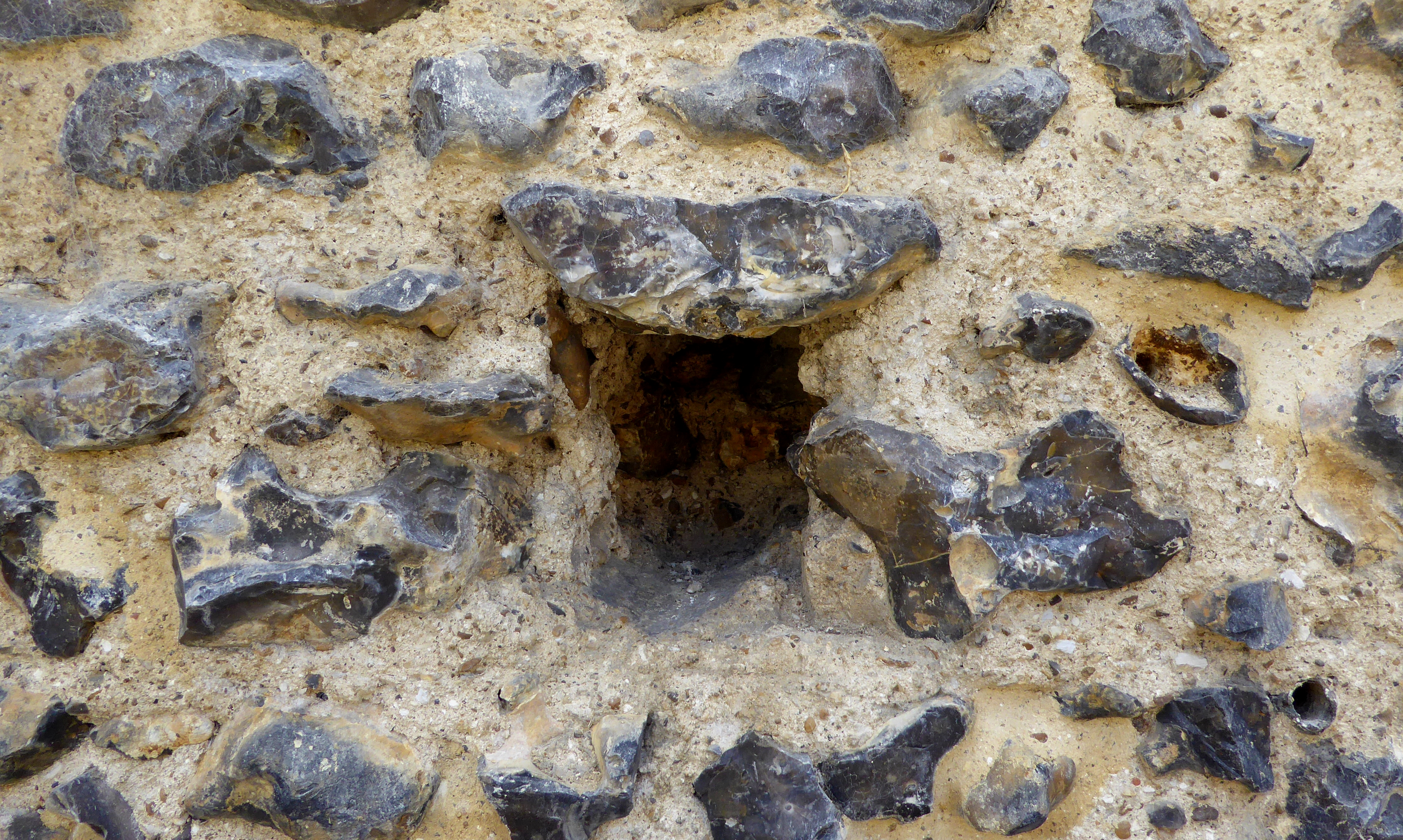
A medieval putlog hole in the wall of Reading Abbey in Berkshire, southern England

In addition to the Putlog couplers (discussed above), there are also Putlog tubes. These have a flattened end or have been fitted with a blade. This feature allows the end of the tube to be inserted into or rest upon the brickwork of the structure.

A Putlog scaffold may also be called a bricklayer's scaffold. As such, the scaffold consists only of a single row of standards with a single ledger. The Putlogs are transoms - attached to the ledger at one end but integrated into the bricks at the other.

Spacing is the same on a Putlog scaffold as on a general purpose scaffold, and ties are still required. In recent years a number of new innovations have meant an increased scope of use for scaffolding, such as ladderbeams for spanning spaces that cannot accommodate standards and the increased use of sheeting and structure to create temporary roofs.

Putlog tubes can also be used vertically when drove under downward pressure into the ground, most typically in greens and fields, where approx 1/4 of the putlog tube remains exposed above ground. The purpose for this alternative method is to create a good anchoring point for additional vertical scaffolding to clamp on to, most commonly used in live events and festivals with scaffolding poles up to 21 feet high where festoon lighting, cabling and bunting can be hung from safely.

=== Pump-jack ===
A pump-jack is a type of portable scaffolding system. The scaffold rests on supports attached to two or more vertical posts. The user raises the scaffolding by pumping the foot pedals on the supports, like an automobile jack.

=== Baker staging ===
Baker staging is a metal scaffold which is easy to assemble. Rolling platforms typically 740 millimetres (29 in) wide by 1.8 metres (6 ft) long and 1.8 metres (6 ft) tall sections which can be stacked up to three high with the use of added outriggers. The work platform height is adjustable.

=== X-Deck ladder scaffolding ===
Low level scaffolding that is height adjustable. It is a hybrid ladder scaffold work platform.

== Standards ==
The widespread use of scaffolding systems, along with the profound importance that they earned in modern applications such as civil engineering projects and temporary structures, led to the definition of a series of standards covering a vast number of specific issues involving scaffolding. Among the standards there are:

- DIN 4420, a DIN standard divided in 5 parts which covers the design and detail of scaffolds, ladder scaffolds, safety requirements and standard types, materials, components, dimensions and loadbearing capacity.
- DIN 4421, a DIN standard which covers the analysis, design and construction of falsework
- 29 CFR Part 1926: Safety Standards for Scaffolds Used in the Construction Industry from the U.S. Occupational Safety and Health Administration (OSHA), with an accompanying "construction eTool"

== See also ==
- Index of construction articles
- National Access and Scaffolding Confederation (UK trade association)
- Sidewalk shed, a related structure that is sometimes referred to as scaffolding
- Steeplejack
- Willow Island disaster
