= List of ovens =

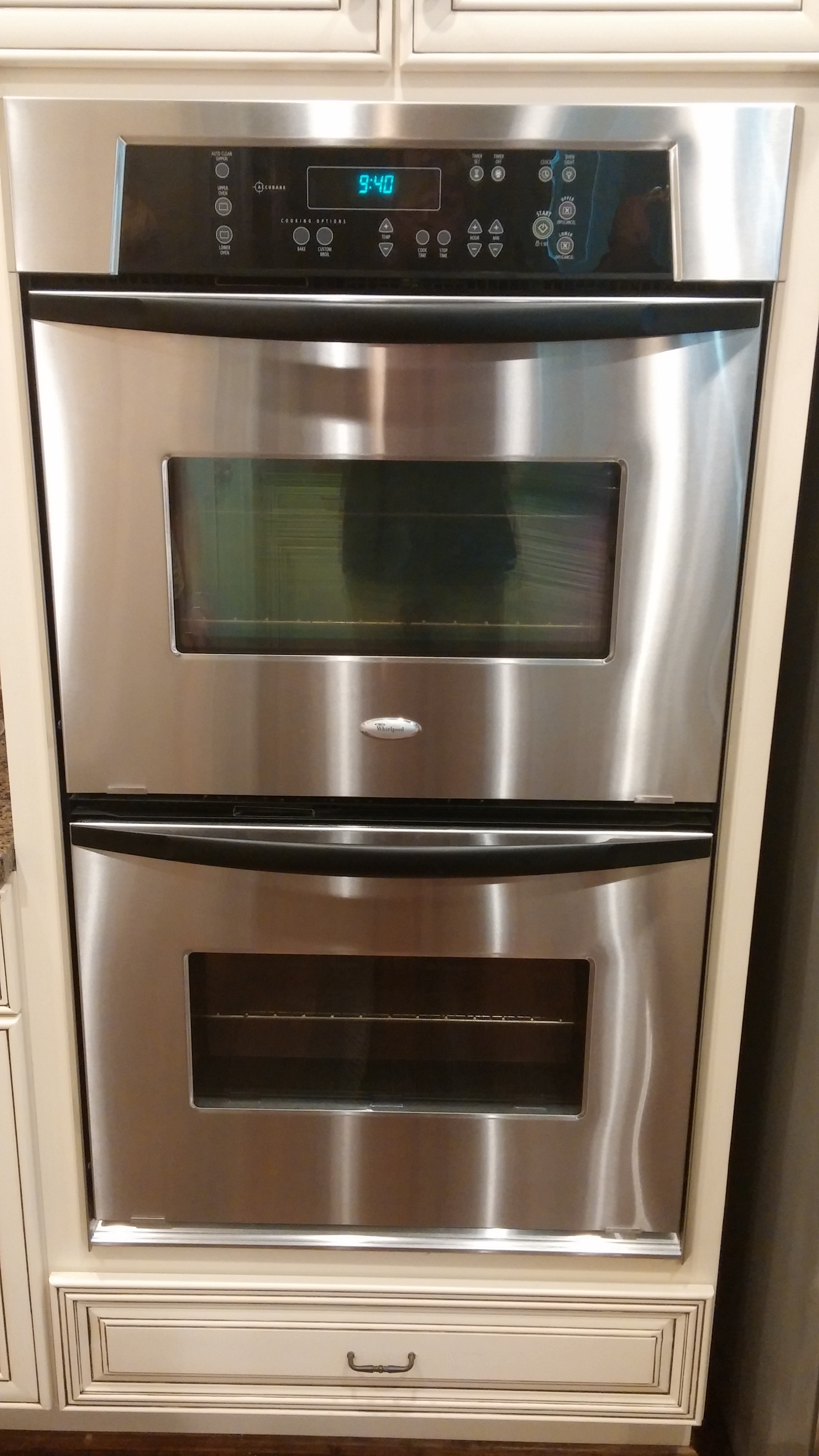
A modern double oven

This is a list of oven types. An oven is a thermally insulated chamber used for the heating, baking or drying of a substance, and most times used for cooking or for industrial processes (industrial oven). Kilns and furnaces are special-purpose ovens. Kilns have historically been used in the production of pottery, quicklime, charcoal, etc., while furnaces are mainly used in metalworking (metallurgical furnace) and other industrial processes (industrial furnace).

== Materials; the two basic historical types ==
Ovens historically have been made by either digging the heating chamber into the earth, or by building them from various materials:

- Earth ovens, dug into the earth and covered with non-permanent means, like leaves and soil
- Masonry ovens, a term historically used for "built-up ovens", usually made of clay, adobe and cob, stone, and brick.

Modern ovens are made of industrial materials.

=== Earth ovens ===
An earth oven, or cooking pit, is one of the most simple and long-used cooking structures. At its simplest, an earth oven is a pit in the ground used to trap heat and bake, smoke, or steam food. Earth ovens have been used in many places and cultures in the past, and the presence of such cooking pits is a key sign of human settlement often sought by archaeologists. They remain a common tool for cooking large quantities of food where no equipment is available.

| Name | Image | Description |
|---|---|---|
| Barbecue | | Barbecue is both a cooking method and apparatus.: Pit barbecue – a method and constructed item for barbecue cooking meat and root vegetables buried below the surface of the earth.; A pit barbecue |
| Hāngī | | A traditional New Zealand Māori method of cooking food using heated rocks buried in a pit oven still used for special occasions. |
| Huatia | | |
| Kalua | | |
| Pachamanca | | |

=== Masonry ovens ===
See below under "Baking ovens", both for masonry oven in general and for various types.

== Purpose ==
Broadly speaking, ovens have always been used either for cooking, prominently for baking; or for industrial purposes – for producing metals out of ores, charcoal, coke, ceramic, etc.

- Baking ovens
- Industrial devices
  - Industrial ovens
  - Furnaces such as metallurgical and industrial furnaces
  - Kilns

=== Baking ===
Baking is a food cooking method that uses prolonged dry heat by convection, rather than by thermal radiation, normally in an oven, but also in hot ashes, or on hot stones. Bread is a commonly baked food.

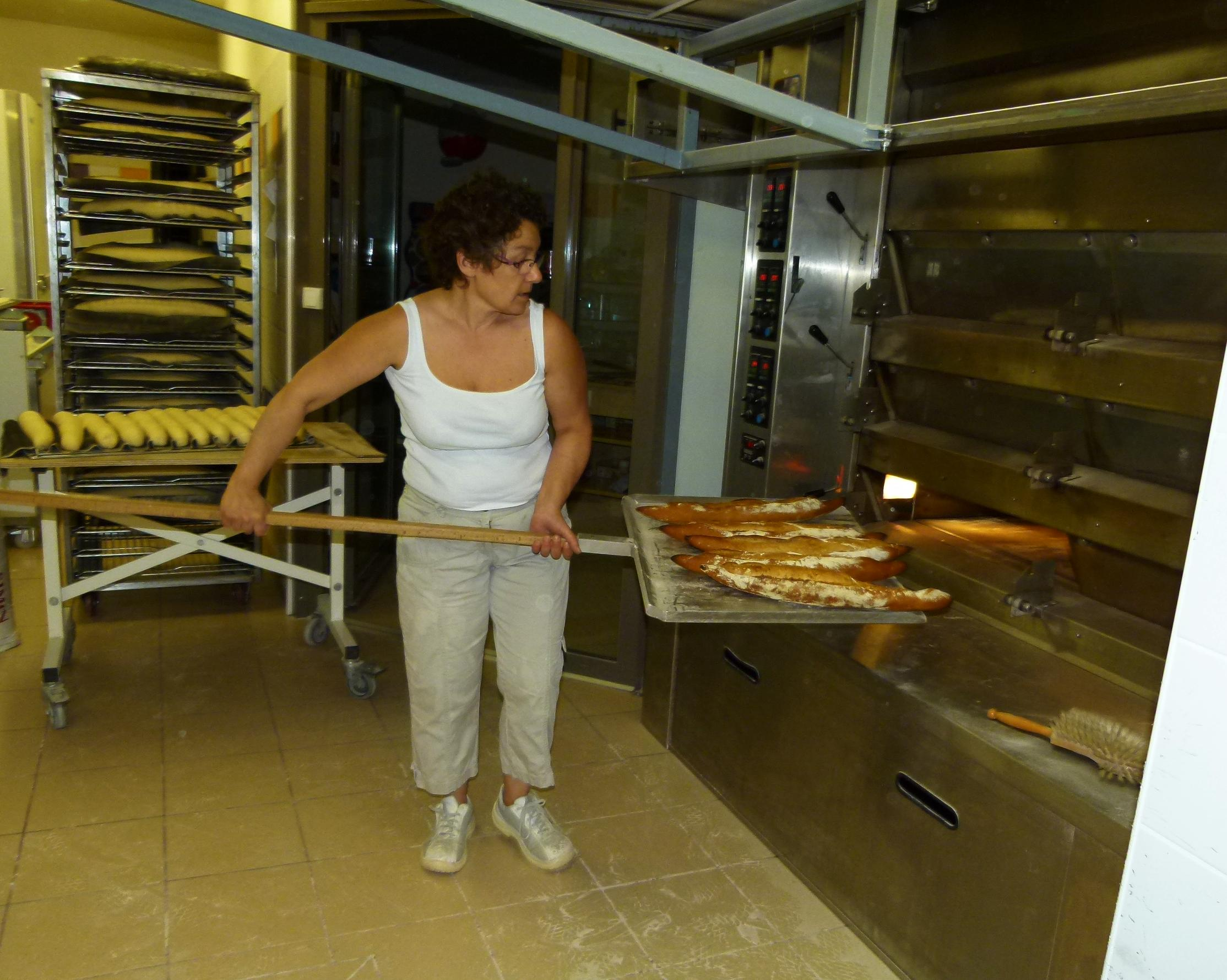
Baking bread in a commercial oven

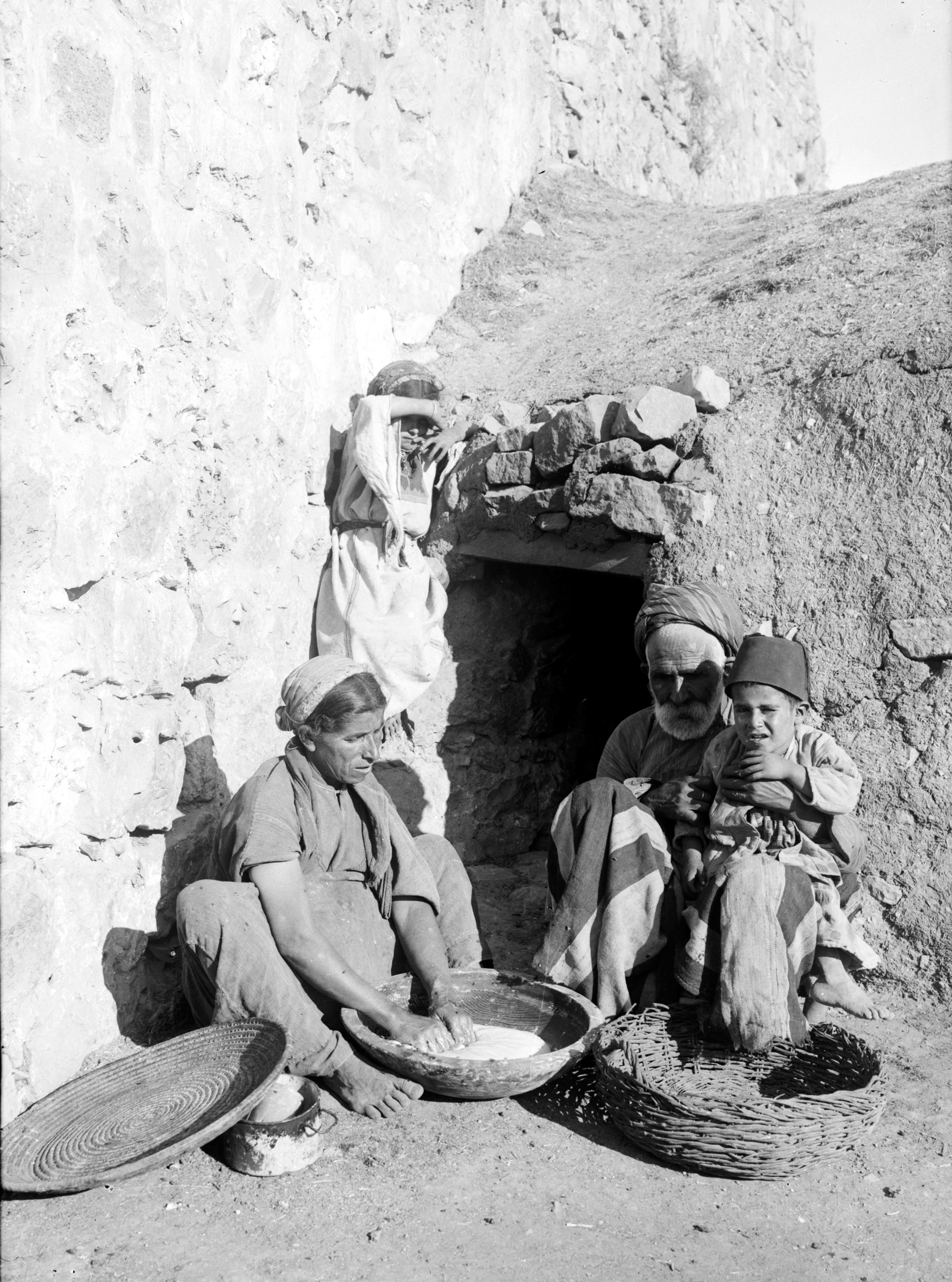
Bread being baked in a tabun oven

| Name | Image | Description |
|---|---|---|
| AGA cooker | | A heat storage oven and cooker, which works on the principle that a heavy frame made from cast iron components can absorb heat from a relatively low-intensity but continuously-burning source, and the accumulated heat can then be used when needed for cooking. |
| Bachelor griller | | |
| Beehive oven | | |
| Chorkor oven | | |
| Clome oven | | |
| Communal oven | | |
| Convection microwave | | |
| Convection oven | | |
| Cooker | | May refer to several types of cooking appliances and devices used for cooking foods |
| Dutch oven | | |
| Easy-Bake Oven | | |
| Egyptian egg oven | | |
| Halogen oven | | |
| Haybox | | |
| Horno | | |
| Hot Box (appliance) | | |
| Kitchen stove | | |
| Kitchener range | | |
| Masonry oven | | In Arabic-speaking countries, the masonry oven is called "furn," derived from the Greek word "fournos" |
| Kyoto box | | |
| Microwave oven | | |
| Reflector oven | | |
| Rotimatic | | An automatic kitchen robot that bakes rotis and tortillas |
| Russian oven | | |
| Self-cleaning oven | | |
| Solar cooker | | |
| Roaster oven | | An electric table or cabinet top popular in the 1950s. Large enough to bake turkeys, they had removable inserts which held the food and a lid, often with a glass insert. |
| Tabun oven | | |
| Tandoor | | |
| Tannur | | May be used for either baking or cooking |
| Toaster and toaster oven | | |
| Trivection oven | | |
| Wood-fired oven | | |

=== Industrial ===
==== Industrial ovens & furnaces ====
Industrial ovens are heated chambers used for a variety of industrial applications, including drying, curing, or baking components, parts or final products. Industrial ovens can be used for large or small volume applications, in batches or continuously with a conveyor line, and a variety of temperature ranges, sizes and configurations.

| Name | Image | Description |
|---|---|---|
| Batch oven | | A type of furnace used for thermal processing. They are used in numerous production and laboratory applications. |
| Burn-in ovens | | |
| Clean process oven | | |
| Flame broiler | | |
| Industrial oven | | Pictured is an industrial convection oven used in the manufacture of aircraft components |
Heat tunnel
| Reach-in oven | | |
| Walk-in/Truck-in ovens | | |
| Spiral ovens | | Ovens with a helical conveyor |

==== Coke ovens ====
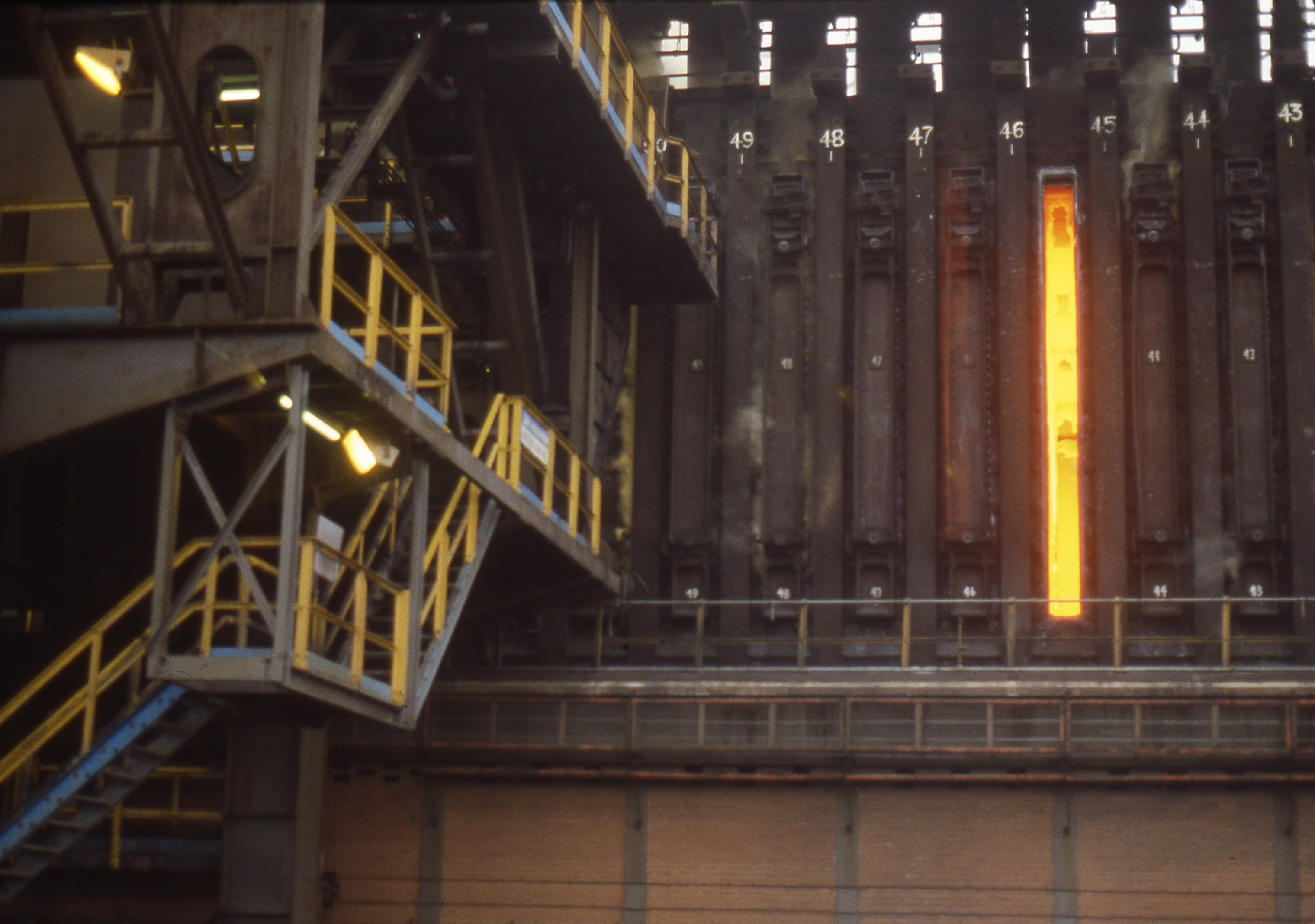
A coke oven at a smokeless fuel plant in Wales, United Kingdom

==== Kilns ====
A kiln is a thermally insulated chamber, a type of oven, that produces temperatures sufficient to complete some process, such as hardening, drying, or chemical changes. Various industries and trades use kilns to harden objects made from clay into pottery, bricks etc. Various industries use rotary kilns for pyroprocessing—to calcinate ores, produce cement, lime, and many other materials.

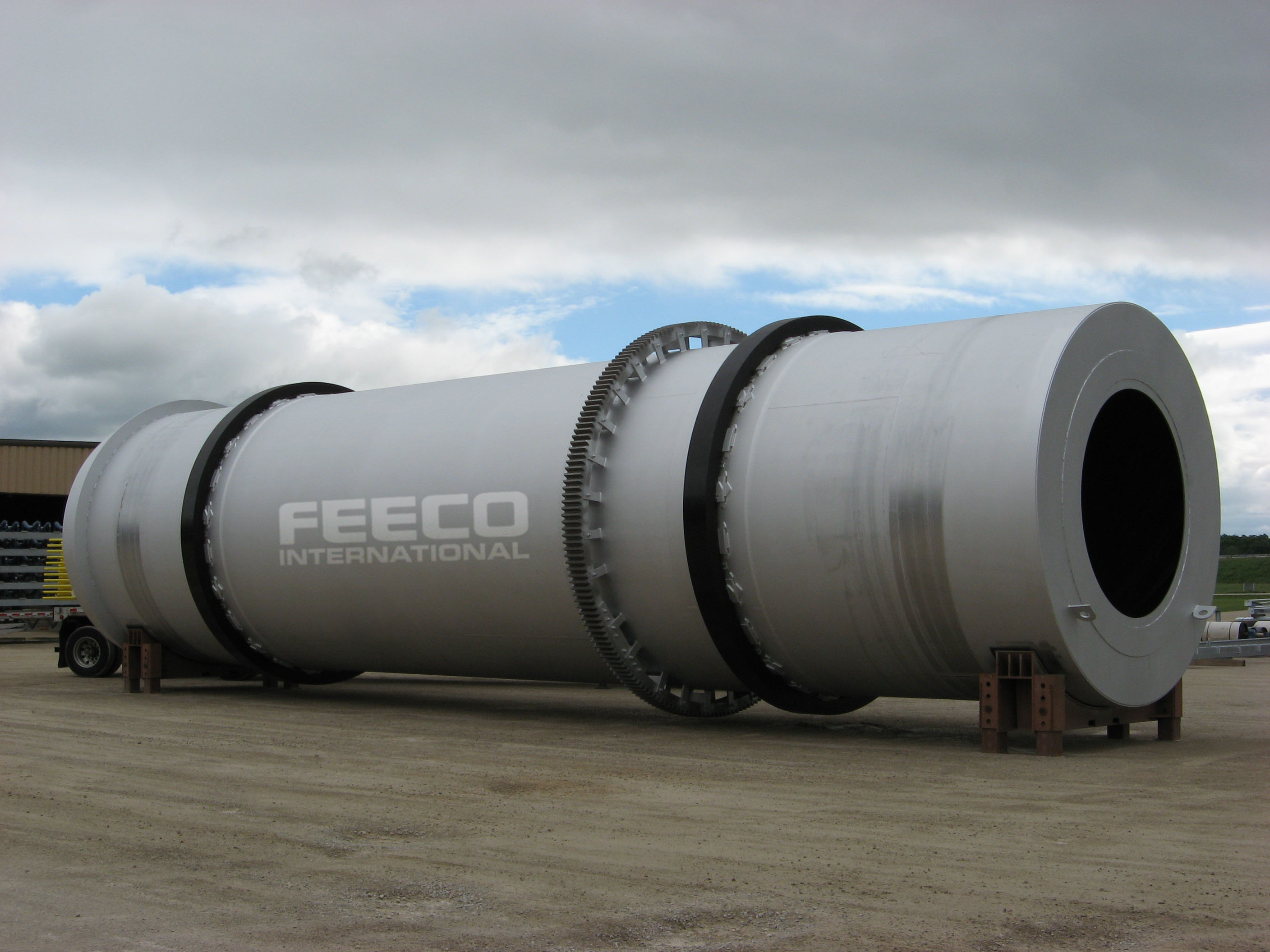
A rotary kiln

| Name | Image | Description |
|---|---|---|
| Anagama kiln | | An ancient type of pottery kiln brought to Japan from China via Korea in the 5th century. |
| Charcoal kiln | | See for instance Birch Creek and Tybo Charcoal Kilns |
| Bottle oven | | |
| Brick clamp | | |
| Cement kiln | | |
| Lime kiln | | |
| Rotary kiln | | A pyroprocessing device used to raise materials to a high temperature (calcination) in a continuous process |
| Top-lit updraft gasifier | | |
| Tube furnace | | |

== See also ==
- Autoclave (industrial)
- Cooker
- Industrial furnace
- Gas mark
- List of cooking appliances
- List of cooking techniques
- List of home appliances
- List of stoves
- Primitive clay oven
- Redstone Coke Oven Historic District
- Stove
