= Magnetization roasting technology =

Method for processing iron ores

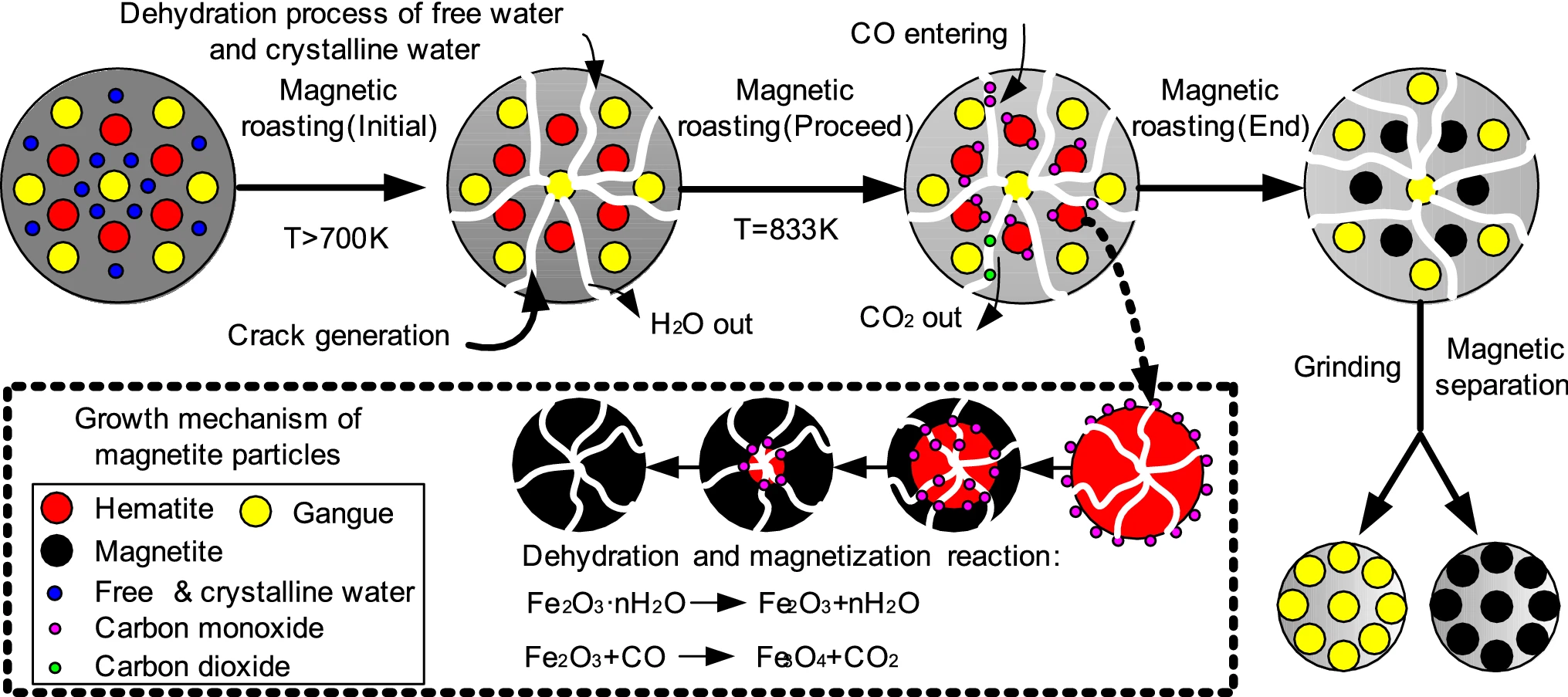
Magnetization roasting mechanism diagram

Magnetic roasting technology refers to the process of heating materials or ores under specific atmospheric conditions to induce chemical reactions. This process selectively converts weakly magnetic iron minerals such as hematite (Fe_{2}O_{3}), siderite (FeCO_{3}), and limonite (Fe_{2}O_{3}·nH_{2}O) into strongly magnetic magnetite (Fe_{3}O_{4}) or maghemite (γ-Fe_{2}O_{3}), while the magnetic properties of gangue minerals remain almost unchanged.

By artificially increasing the magnetic disparity between iron oxides and gangue minerals through magnetic roasting, the selectivity of iron ore is improved, making it the most effective method for separating refractory iron ores. Additionally, the roasting process can eliminate harmful impurities such as crystalline water, sulfur, and arsenic from the ore, loosening the ore structure and enhancing subsequent grinding efficiency.

Researchers in mineral processing have been developing magnetic roasting technology for iron ore since the early 20th century. Depending on the type of reactor used, magnetic roasting can be classified into shaft furnace roasting, rotary kiln roasting, fluidized bed roasting, and microwave roasting.

== Types ==
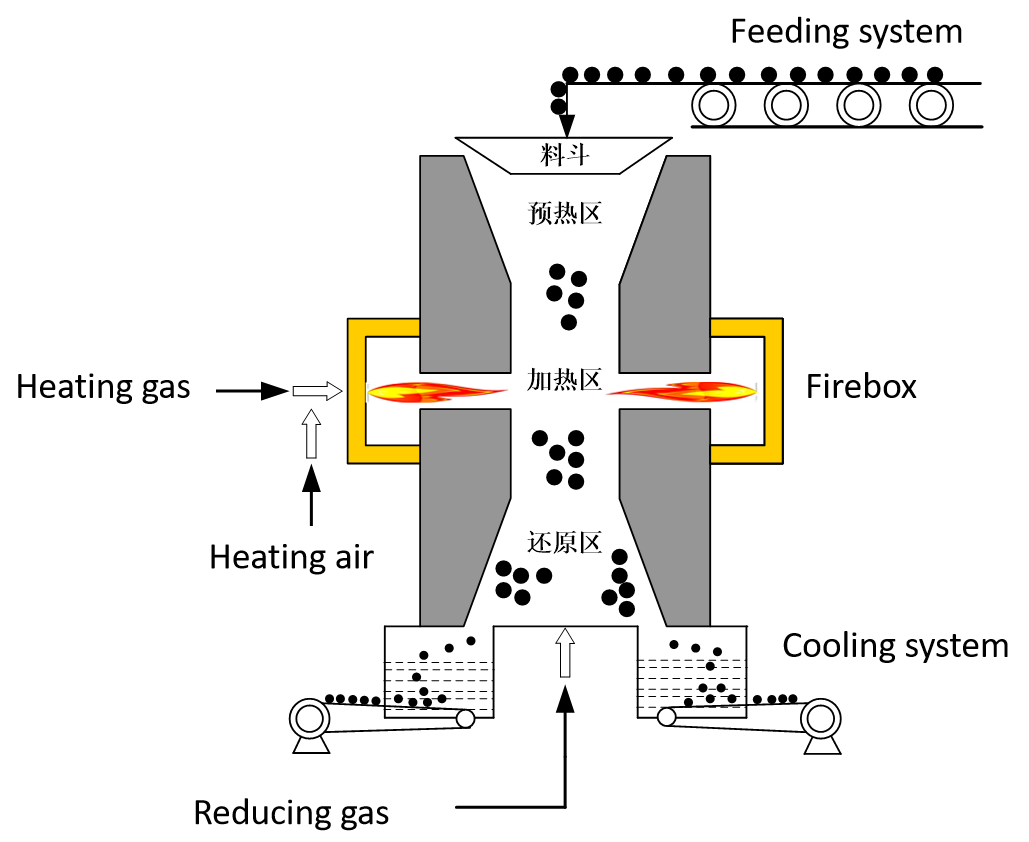
Shaft Furnace Magnetic Roasting

=== Shaft furnace magnetic roasting ===
Shaft furnace magnetization roasting is a metallurgical process, mainly used to treat iron ore, so that in a high temperature environment by reacting with reducing agents (such as coal, coke or gas), the iron oxides (such as hematite, limonite, etc.) to reduce to magnetic iron minerals (mainly magnetite). The process is usually carried out in the vertical furnace, the charge is top-down under the action of gravity, through layer by layer heating and reduction reaction, and finally obtain magnetic iron ore, so as to improve its magnetic separation performance, and facilitate the subsequent beneficiation and smelting process.

The main steps of magnetizing roasting in shaft furnace include: Charge preparation: Mix iron ore with reducing agent in a certain proportion. Heating: The charge is added from the top of the shaft furnace and heated layer by layer as it falls to a roasting temperature (usually between 700 °C and 900 °C). Reduction reaction: The iron oxide in the ore reacts with the reducing agent and is reduced to magnetic iron minerals (such as magnetite). Cooling and discharge: The roasted material is cooled and discharged from the bottom of the shaft furnace.

=== Rotary Kiln Magnetic Roasting ===
Magnetization roasting in rotary kiln is to reduce iron oxides (such as hematite, limonite, etc.) in the ore to magnetic iron minerals (mainly magnetite) by reacting iron ore containing iron ore with reducing agents (such as coal, coke or natural gas) in a rotating high-temperature kiln. This process helps to improve the magnetic separation performance of iron ore and facilitate subsequent beneficiation and smelting operations..

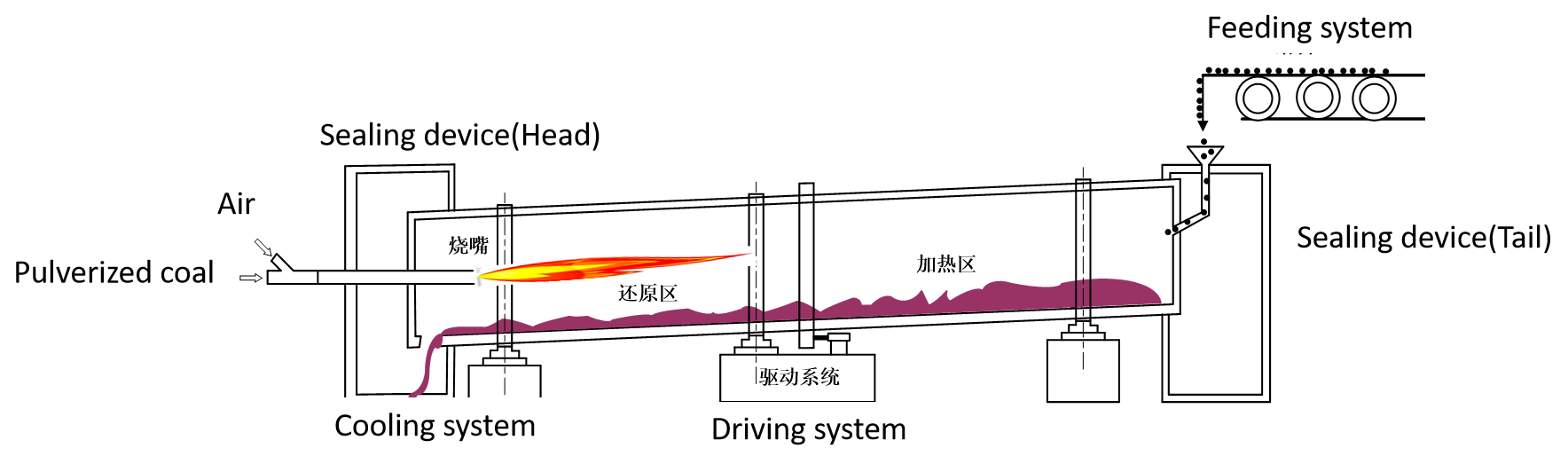
Rotary Kiln Magnetic Roasting

The main steps of magnetization roasting in rotary kiln include: Raw material preparation: Mix the iron ore with the appropriate amount of reducing agent, and add the binder if necessary to improve the roasting effect. Feed: The mixture is uniformly fed into the kiln head of the rotary kiln through the feed device. Roasting: The rotary kiln is rotated at high temperatures (usually between 700 °C and 900 °C), and the material is continuously rolled and moved forward in the kiln, in full contact with the reducing atmosphere, so that the iron oxide is reduced to magnetic iron minerals (such as magnetite). Cooling and discharge: The calcined material is cooled by a cooling system (such as a cooling kiln or cooling cylinder) and discharged from the end of the rotary kiln.

=== Fluidized bed magnetic roasting ===
Fluidized bed magnetic roasting is the use of suspension roaster to fully mix and contact fine ore with reducing agents (such as pulverized coal, natural gas, etc.) in high temperature environment, so that the iron oxides in the ore (such as hematite, limonite, etc.) are reduced to magnetic iron minerals (mainly magnetite), thereby improving the magnetic separation performance of the ore and facilitating subsequent beneficiation and smelting operations.

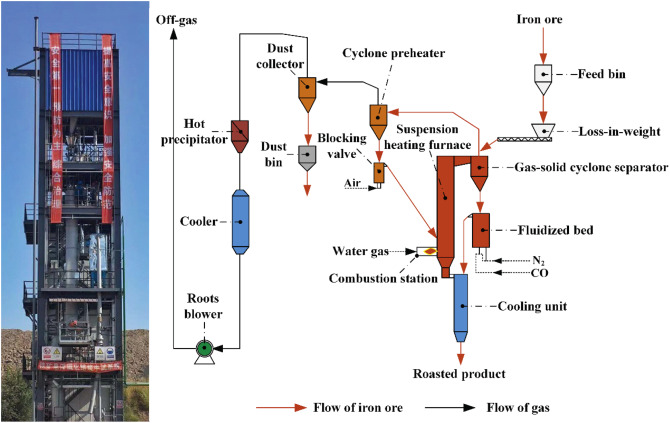
Fluidized Bed Magnetic Roasting

The main steps of suspension magnetization roasting include: Raw material preparation: Mix iron ore powder with reducing agent, add auxiliary agent if necessary to improve roasting effect. Roasting: The mixed material is suspended in the baking furnace by air flow, and at high temperatures (usually between 700 °C and 900 °C), the material is fully in contact with the reducing gas, and the reduction reaction is carried out to convert the iron oxide into magnetic iron minerals. Cooling and collection: The roasted material is cooled by a cooling system and collected by equipment such as a cyclone or a cloth bag collector.

=== Microwave magnetic roasting ===
Microwave magnetization roasting uses microwave as an energy source to reduce iron oxides (such as hematite, limonite, etc.) in iron ore to magnetic iron minerals (mainly magnetite). In this process, the ore is rapidly heated, so that the reduction reaction is completed in a short time, so as to improve the magnetic separation performance of the ore, and facilitate subsequent beneficiation and smelting operations.

The main steps of microwave magnetization roasting include: Raw material preparation: Mix iron ore powder with reducing agent (such as toner, pulverized coal, etc.) evenly. Microwave heating: The mixture is placed in a microwave oven and heated by microwave radiation. Microwave energy acts directly on the material to rapidly heat it to the desired roasting temperature (usually between 500 °C and 900 °C). Reduction reaction: At high temperatures, iron oxides and reducing agents undergo a reduction reaction to produce magnetic iron minerals (such as magnetite). Cooling and collection: The roasted material is cooled by a cooling system and collected for treatment

== Magnetization roasting method ==
The commonly used magnetization roasting methods can be divided into reduction roasting, neutral roasting, oxidation roasting, redox roasting and reduction oxidation roasting.

=== Reduction roasting ===
After heating to a certain temperature, hematite, limonite and iron-manganese ore can be transformed into strong magnetic magnetite by reacting with an appropriate amount of reducing agent. Commonly used reducing agents are C, CO, H2 and so on. The reaction of hematite with reducing agent is as follows:

$$\ce{3 Fe2O3  +  C  ->  2 Fe3O4  +   CO}$$
$$\ce{3 Fe2O3  +  CO  ->   2Fe3O4  +   CO2}$$
$$\ce{3 Fe2O3  +  H2  ->  2 Fe3O4  +   H2O}$$

=== Neutral roasting ===
Carbonated iron ores such as siderite, magnesite, magnesite and magnesium siderite can be decomposed to produce magnetite after heating to a certain temperature (300-- 400 degrees Celsius) without air or by injecting a small amount of air. The chemical reaction is as follows:

$$\ce{3 FeCO3  ->   Fe3O4  +  2 CO2 +  CO}$$
$$\ce{3 FeCO3 +  CO ->  2 Fe3O4  +  CO2}$$

=== Oxidation roasting ===
Pyrite is oxidized in oxygen for a short time to oxidize to pyrite. If the roasting time is very long, the pyrite can continue to react into magnetite. The chemical reaction is as follows.

$$\ce{7 FeS2 + 6 CO ->   Fe7S8  +  6 SO2}$$
$$\ce{3 Fe7S8 + 38 O2 ->  7 Fe3O4  + 24 SO2}$$

=== Redox roasting ===
Iron ore containing siderite, hematite or limonite, when the ratio of siderite to hematite is less than 1, the siderite is oxidized to hematite to a certain extent in the oxidizing atmosphere, and then it is reduced to magnetite together with the original hematite in the ore in the reducing atmosphere.

Reduction oxidation roasting The magnetite produced by magnetization roasting of various iron ore can be oxidized into strong magnetic hematite when cooled to below 400 °C in an oxygen-free atmosphere and then in contact with the air. The chemical reaction is as follows:

$$\ce{3 Fe3O4  +  O2  ->  6 Fe2O3}$$

== See also ==
- Iron
- Chemical reaction
- Roasting (metallurgy)
- Magnetic separation
- Rotary kiln
