= Top-lit updraft gasifier =

Micro-kiln used to produce charcoal and heat

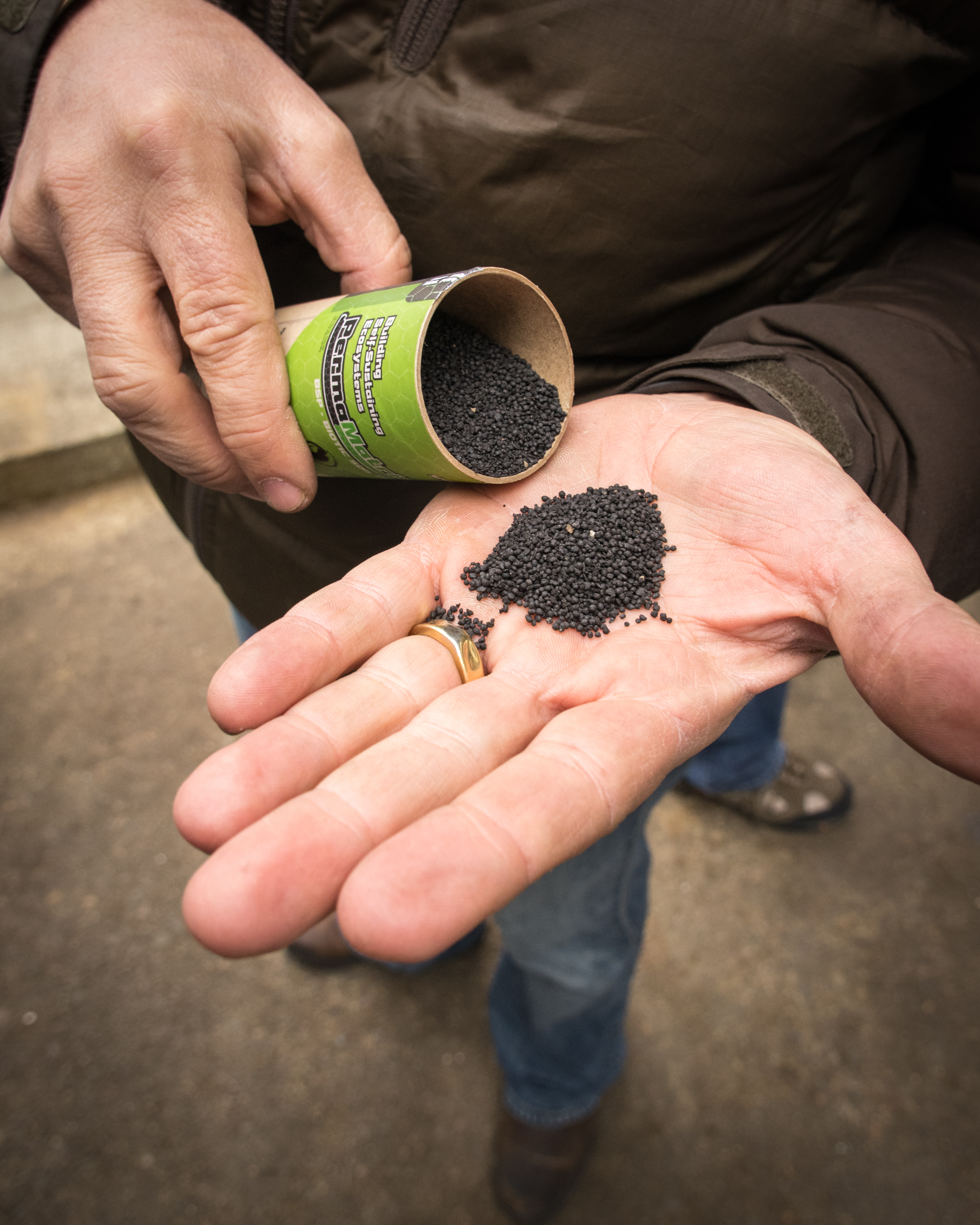
TLUDs make biochar.

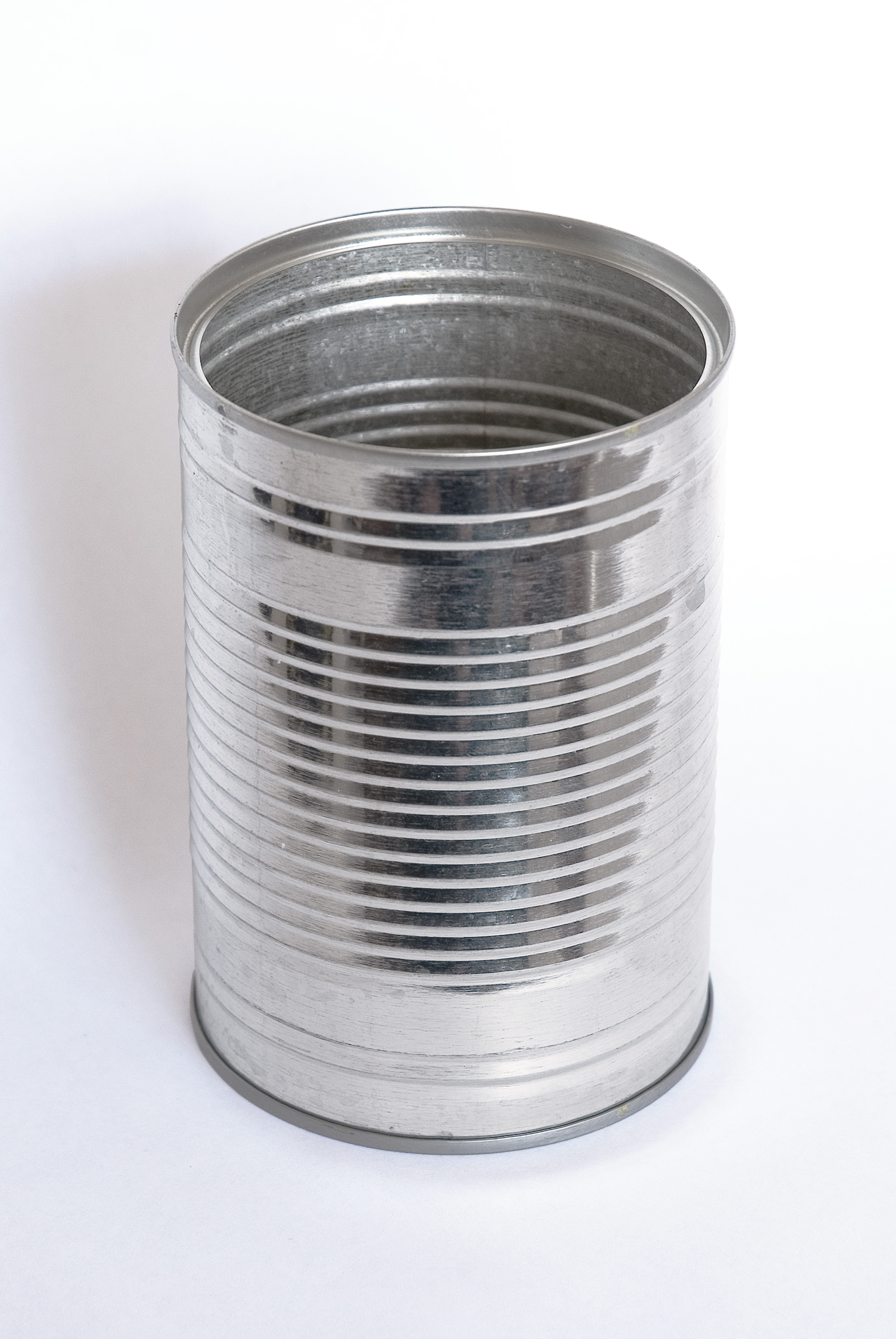
TLUDs can be made from tin cans rescued from the garbage, old pots, and other materials.

A top-lit updraft gasifier (also known as a TLUD) is a micro-kiln used to produce charcoal, especially biochar, and heat for cooking. A TLUD pyrolyzes organic material, including wood or manure, and uses a reburner to eliminate volatile byproducts of pyrolization. The process leaves mostly carbon as a residue, which can be incorporated into soil to create terra preta.

Dr Thomas B Reed and the Norwegian architect Paal Wendelbo independently developed the working idea of a TLUD gasifier in the 1990s.

A TLUD gasifier is a considerable improvement on the rocket stove, being a more efficient way to achieve smoke-free combustion of the fuel.

== Design ==
A TLUD gasifier stove is commonly constructed with two concentric cylindrical containers.

The inner cylinder is the fuel pot. The fuel pot has holes in the base. These holes are the primary air inlet. The fuel pot also has holes on the neck, like the skirt, serving as a secondary air inlet.

The outer cylinder has holes near the bottom on the sides. During combustion, air enters these holes, either by natural air draft or forced with a DC fan depending on requirement and construction model.

Any biomass with less than 20% water content can be used as fuel. The user fills the fuel pot up to the neck, just below the secondary air inlet holes. The user ignites the top layer of fuel for the pyrolysis to start. Air then flows in through the primary and secondary air inlets. The primary inlet helps the draft of pyrolysed wood gas flow up.

The secondary air inlet blows hot air by the time it travels around the fuel pot. The secondary inlet above the fuel layer helps burn the wood gas.

== See also ==
- List of ovens
