= Cooker =

Cooker may refer to several types of cooking appliances and devices used for cooking foods.

== Types ==
- AGA cooker – a heat storage stove and cooker, which works on the principle that a heavy frame made from cast iron components can absorb heat from a relatively low-intensity but continuously-burning source, and the accumulated heat can then be used when needed for cooking. Originally heated by slow-burning coal, the Aga cooker was invented in 1922 by the Nobel Prize-winning Swedish physicist Gustaf Dalén (1869–1937), who was employed first as the chief engineer of the Swedish AGA company
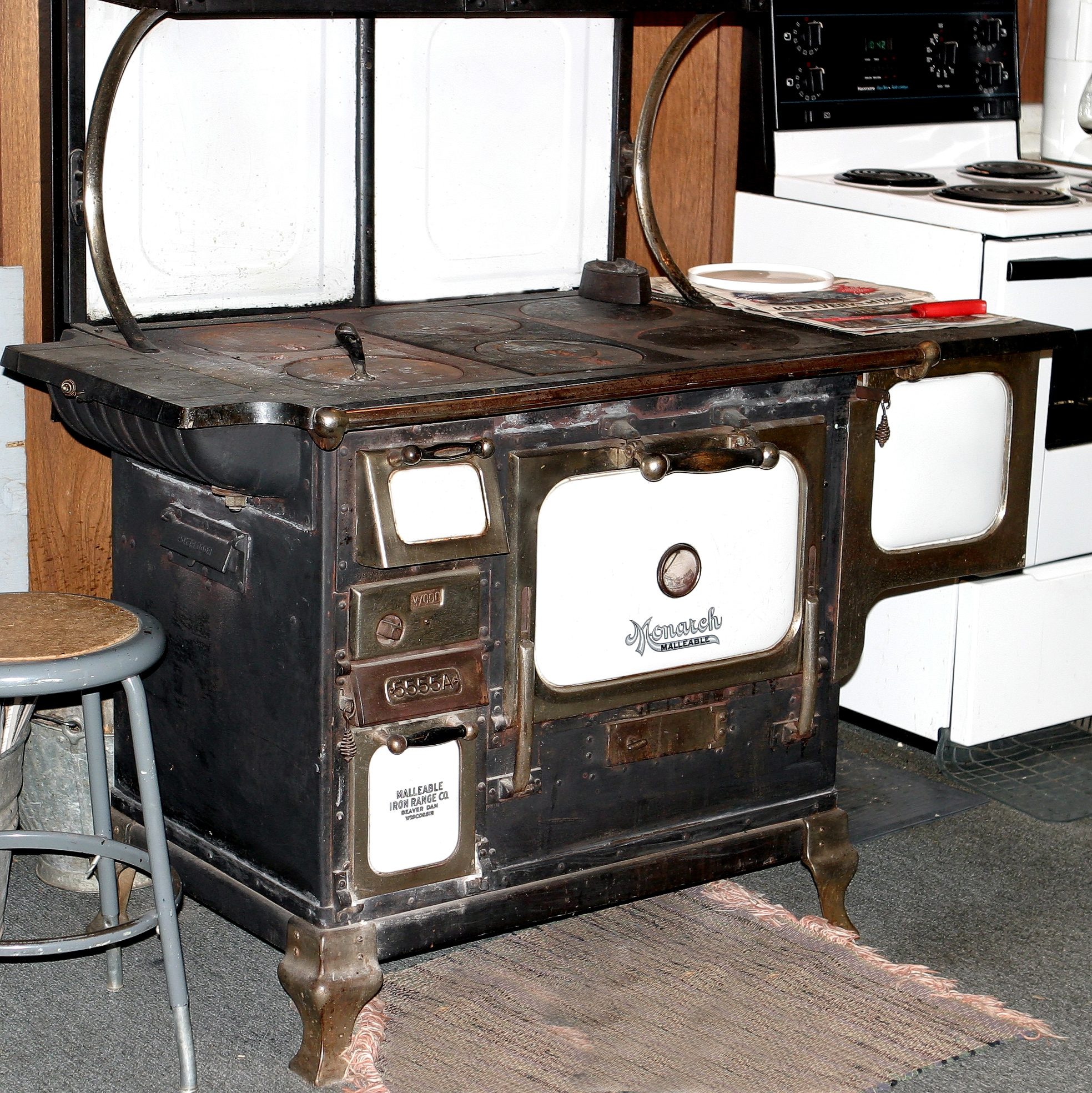
- A wood-burning iron kitchen stove
  Cook stove – heated by burning wood, charcoal, animal dung or crop residue. Cook stoves are commonly used for cooking and heating food in households that lack access to clean, modern facilities for cooking.
- Electric cooker – an electric powered cooking device for heating and cooking of food
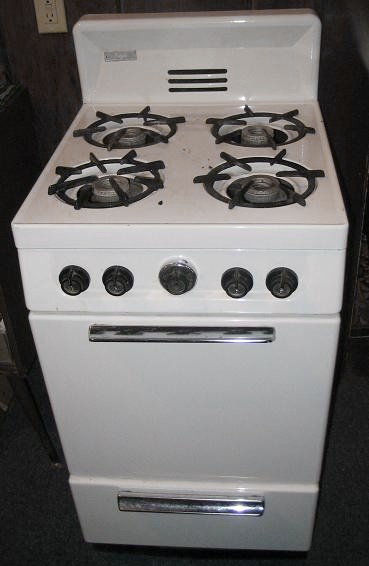
- A gas stove
  Gas stove (British English) – uses natural gas, propane, butane, liquefied petroleum gas or other flammable gas as a fuel source. Most modern stoves come in a unit with built-in extractor hoods.
- Induction cooker – heats a cooking vessel with induction heating, instead of infrared radiation from electrical wires or a gas flame as with a traditional cooking stove. For all models of induction cooktop, a cooking vessel must be made of a ferromagnetic metal such as cast iron or stainless steel or at least compounded with a steel inlay. Copper, glass and aluminum vessels can be placed on a ferromagnetic interface disk which enables these materials to be used.
- Kitchen stove (British English) – a kitchen appliance designed for the purpose of cooking food. Kitchen stoves rely on the application of direct heat for the cooking process and may also contain an oven, used for baking.
- Pressure cooker – heats food quickly because the internal steam pressure from the boiling liquid causes saturated steam (or "wet steam") to bombard and permeate the food. Thus, higher temperature water vapour (i.e., increased energy), which transfers heat more rapidly compared to dry air, cooks food very quickly.
- Rice cooker – also referred to as a rice steamer, is an electric kitchen appliance used to boil or steam rice. Apart from cooking rice, there are multiple recipes cooking options in modern rice cookers such as cooking lentils in rice cooker recipe, etc. Electric rice cookers were developed in Japan, where they are known as suihanki (Jap.: 炊飯器).
- Slow cooker – also known as a Crock-Pot, (a trademark that is sometimes used generically in the US, Canada, Australia and New Zealand), is a countertop electrical cooking appliance that is used for simmering, which requires maintaining a relatively low temperature. It allows for the unattended cooking for many hours of pot roast, stews, soups, "boiled" dinners and other suitable dishes, including dips, desserts and beverages.
- Solar cooker – a device which uses the energy of direct sunlight to heat, cook or pasteurize food or drink. Many solar cookers presently in use are relatively inexpensive, low-tech devices, although some are as powerful or as expensive as traditional stoves, and advanced, large-scale solar cookers can cook for hundreds of people.
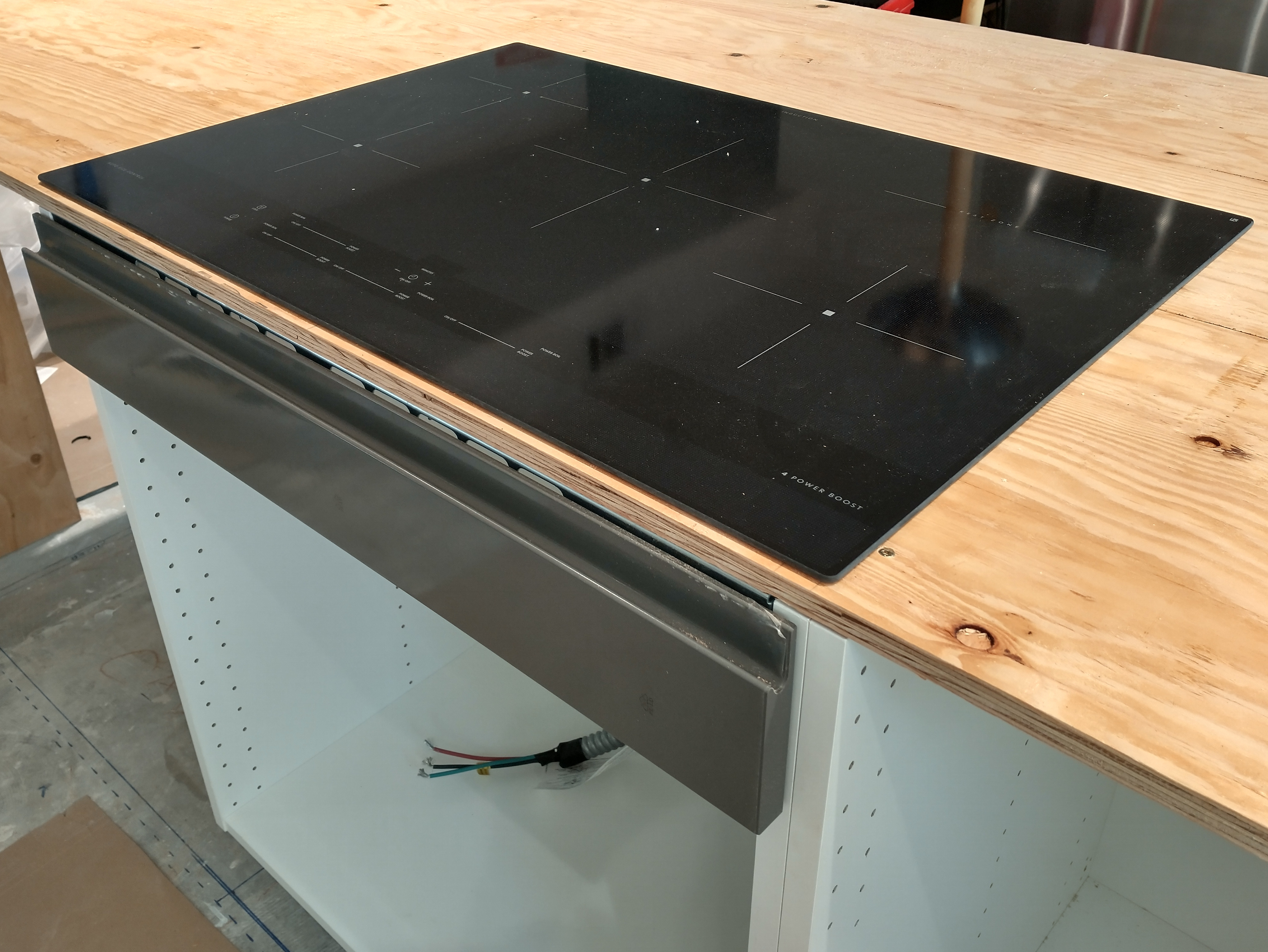
Top view of an induction stove

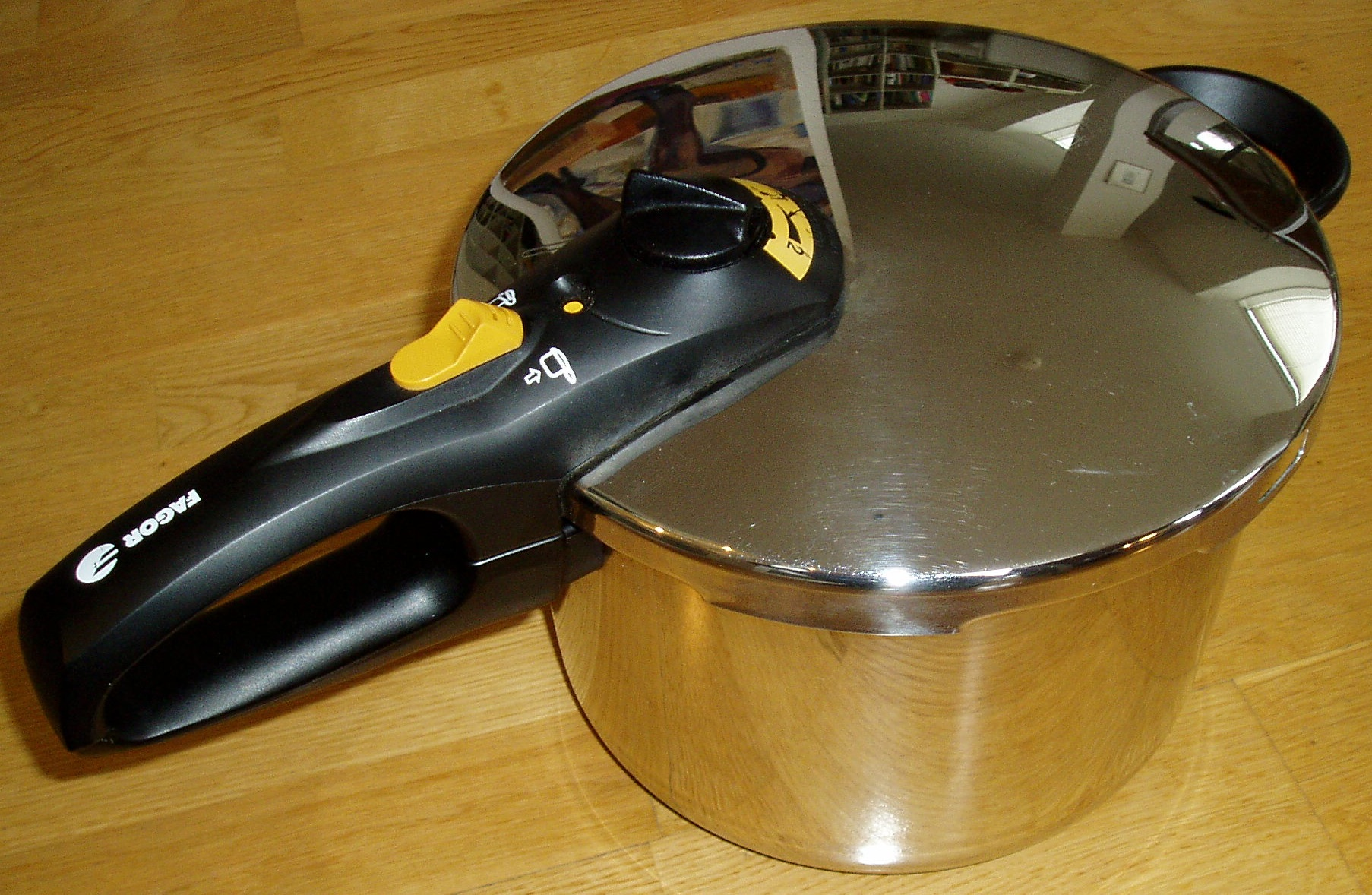
A pressure cooker

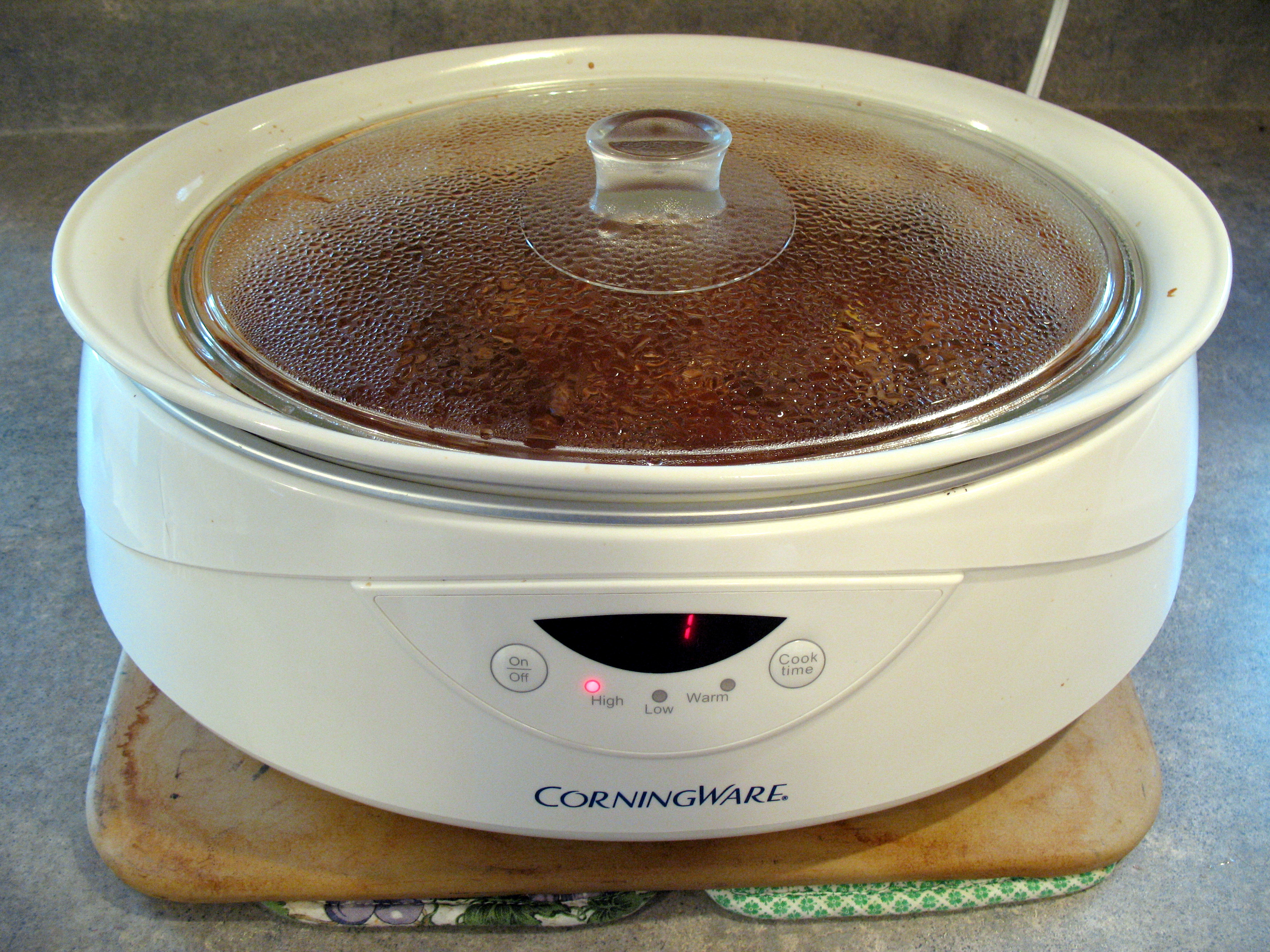
A slow cooker with button controls and a digital timer

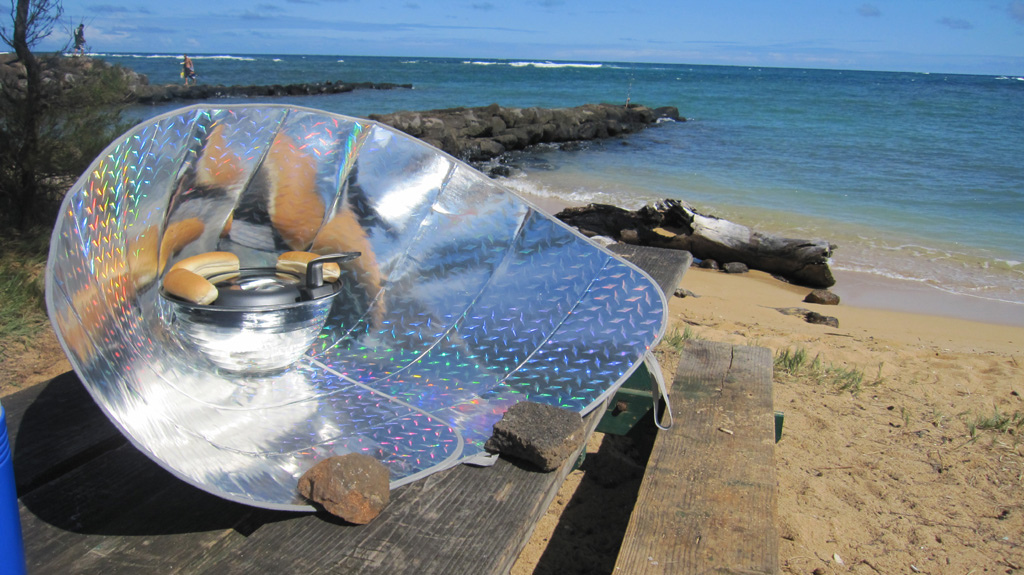
Hot dogs being cooked with a solar funnel cooker

== In popular culture ==
The Cooker is the given name to a coin-activated robot made out of an oven and storage cabinet that patrols the moon, as seen in the 1989 Wallace and Gromit short, A Grand Day Out. It is very protective of the moon and becomes hostile when it discovers that Wallace and Gromit have landed there. It secretly has a lifelong dream of skiing. As well as being called The Cooker, an audio adaptation of A Grand Day Out refers to it as "The Moon Machine".

== See also ==
- The Cooker, 1958 album by Lee Morgan
- Cooking apple
- Cook (profession)
- List of cooking appliances
- List of cooking techniques
- List of cooking vessels
- List of ovens
- List of stoves
- List of words having different meanings in British and American English: A–L#C
