= Cement kiln =

High temperature rotating oven used for producing clinker

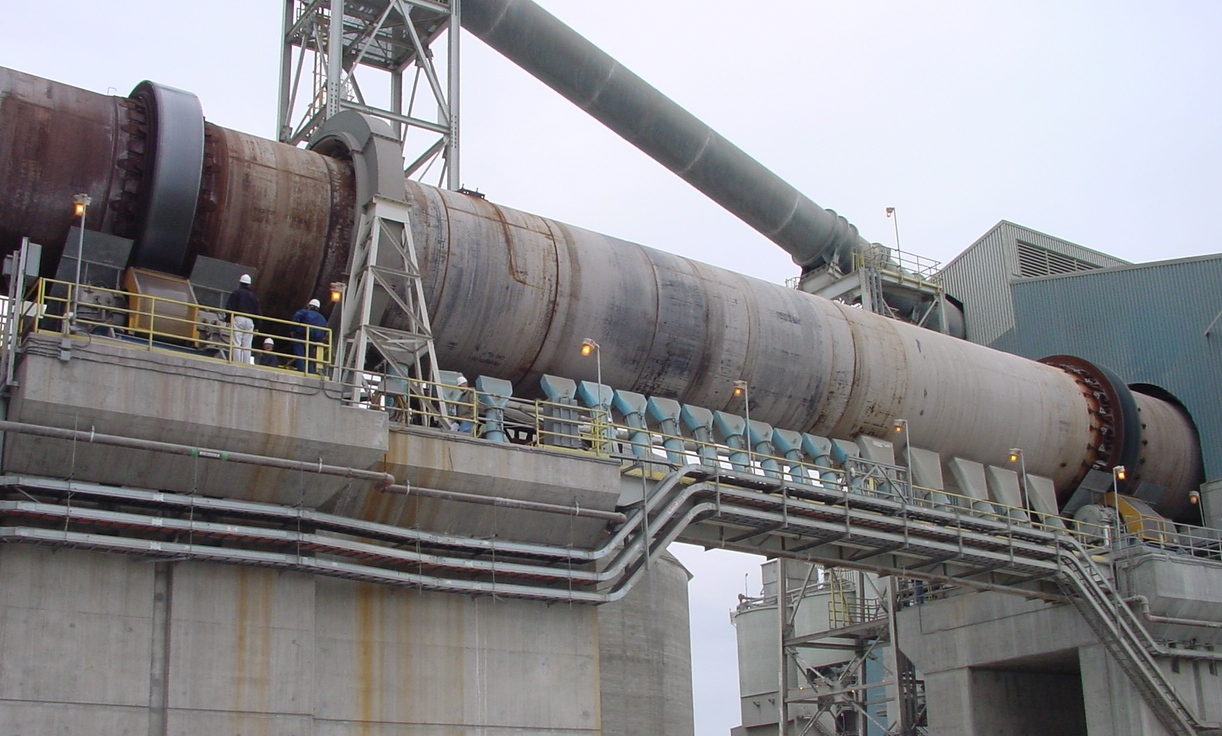
Hot end of medium-sized modern cement kiln, showing tyres, rollers and drive gear

Cement kilns are mechanical, industrial furnaces used for the pyroprocessing stage of manufacture of portland and other types of hydraulic cement. The kilns use high heat to cook calcium carbonate with silica-bearing minerals to create the more reactive mixture of calcium silicates, called clinker, which is ground into a fine powder that is the main component of cements and concretes.

Kilns are relatively distributed technologies all over the world: over a billion tonnes of cement are made per year, and cement kiln capacity defines the capacity of the cement plants. The kilns is an integrated part of the cement plant, connected by a number of ancillary pieces of equipment, used to engineer an ideal flow of cement to the rest of the system. Improvement to kiln systems and ancillary equipment, such as heat recovery, can improve the efficiency kilns and reduce the cost of overall operation of a cement plan.

Emissions from cement kilns are a major source of greenhouse gas emissions, accounting for around 2.5% of non-natural carbon emissions worldwide. The emissions come from two sources: the fuel and the waste CO2 created from heating the silicate rocks. Conventional cement kilns burn fossil fuels or alternative fuels like tire waste, agricultural waste or other wastes, as a form of waste valorization. Because of the need to reduce emissions to mitigate climate change, multiple companies are investing in alternative fuel sources, including investigations of hydrogen or electricity based heating. Other mitigation approaches, include capturing carbon dioxide from the process at the exhaust stage of the kiln, and reducing use of clinker in final mix of concretes.

Kilns also produce other toxic emissions, such as particulates, sulfur dioxide, nitrogen dioxide and other industrial emissions. If not mitigated correctly at the emissions pipe, surrounding communities can have increases in air pollution.

== The manufacture of cement clinker ==
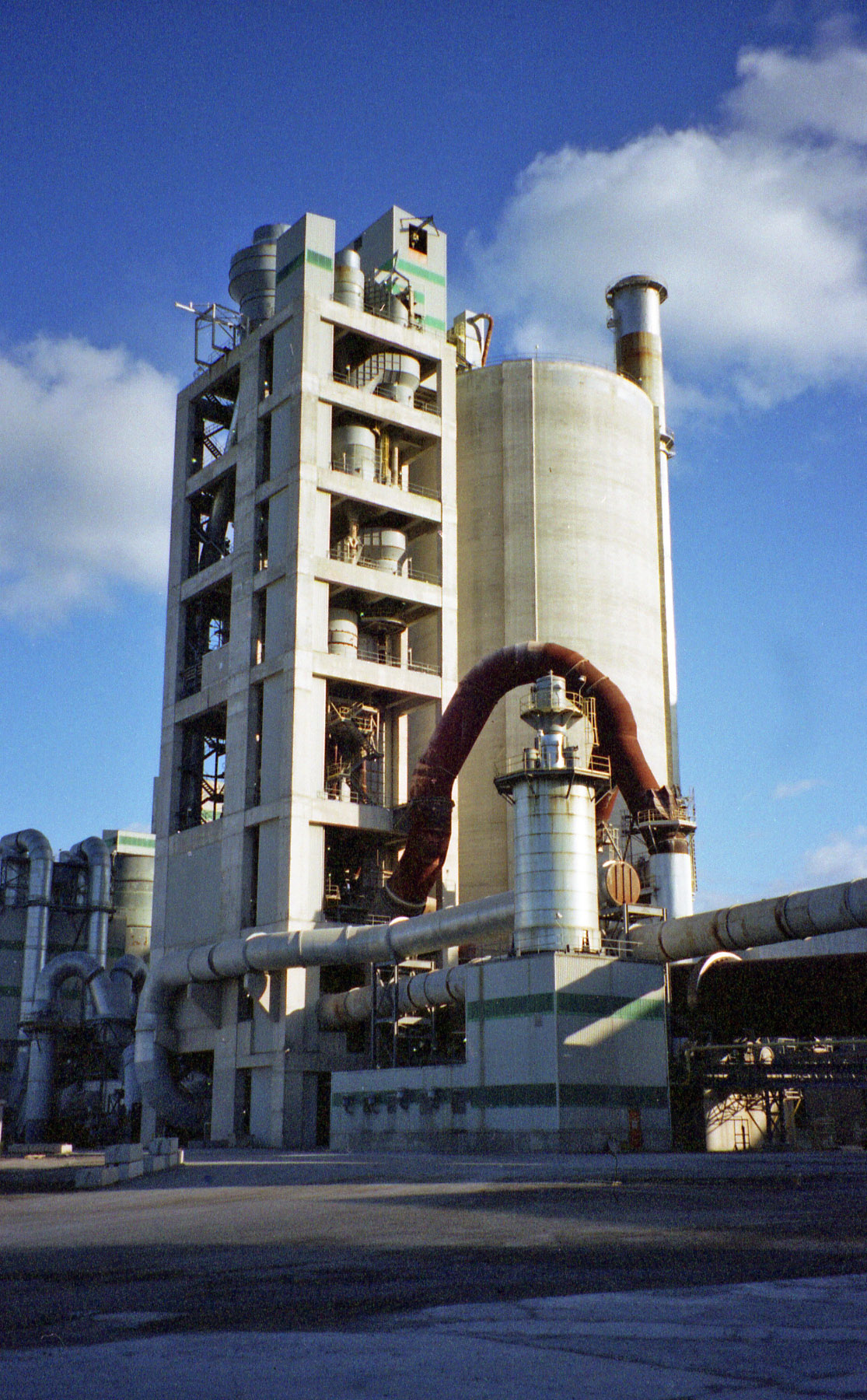
A preheater tower, rawmix silo and exhaust stack. Bottom left: rawmill. Bottom right: rotary kiln with tertiary air duct above. The U-shaped duct leading from the kiln inlet is an "alkali bleed".

A typical process of manufacture consists of three stages:

- grinding a mixture of limestone and clay or shale to make a fine "rawmix" (see Rawmill);
- heating the rawmix to sintering temperature (up to 1450 °C) in a cement kiln;
- grinding the resulting clinker to make cement (see Cement mill).

In the second stage, the rawmix is fed into the kiln and gradually heated by contact with the hot gases from combustion of the kiln fuel. Successive chemical reactions take place as the temperature of the rawmix rises:

- 70 to 110 °C – Free water is evaporated.
- 400 to 600 °C – clay-like minerals are decomposed into their constituent oxides; principally SiO_{2} and Al_{2}O_{3}. dolomite (CaMg(CO_{3})_{2}) decomposes to calcium carbonate (CaCO_{3}), MgO and CO_{2}.
- 650 to 900 °C – calcium carbonate reacts with SiO_{2} to form belite (Ca_{2}SiO_{4}) (also known as C2S in the Cement Industry).
- 900 to 1050 °C – the remaining calcium carbonate decomposes to calcium oxide (CaO) and CO_{2}.
- 1300 to 1450 °C – partial (20–30%) melting takes place, and belite reacts with calcium oxide to form alite (Ca_{3}O·SiO_{4}) (also known as C3S in the Cement Industry).

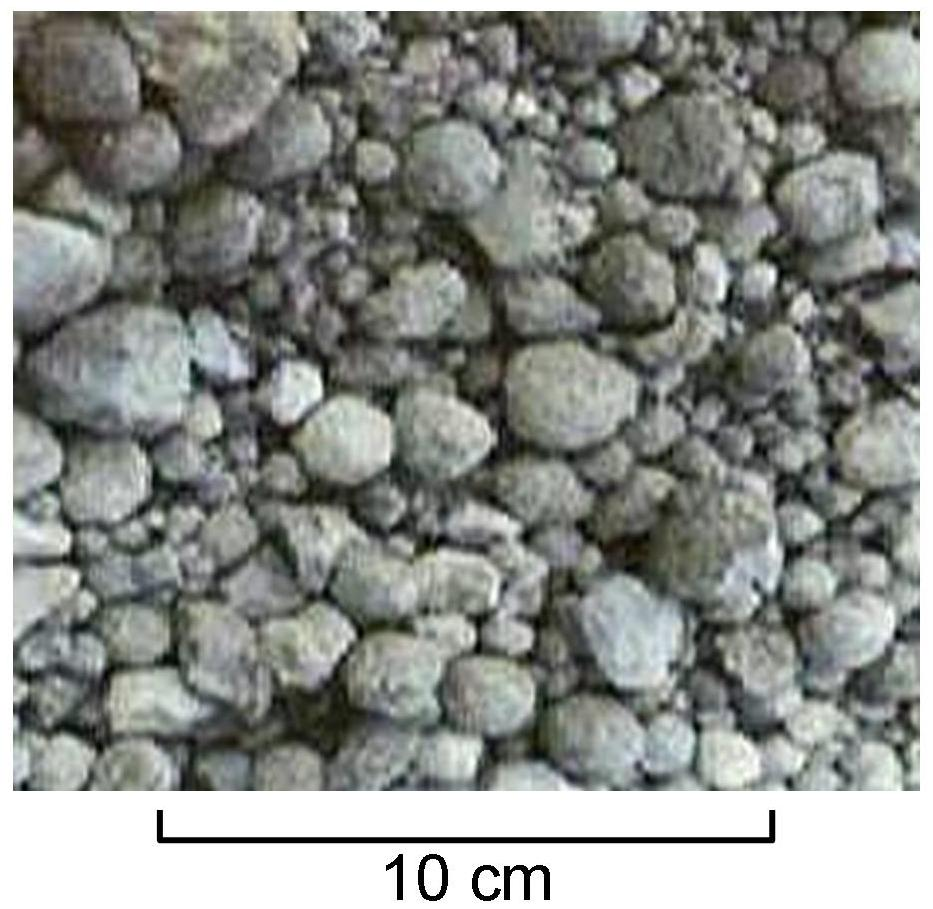
Typical clinker nodules

Alite is the characteristic constituent of Portland cement. Typically, a peak temperature of 1400–1450 °C is required to complete the reaction. The partial melting causes the material to aggregate into lumps or nodules, typically of diameter 1–10 mm. This is called clinker. The hot clinker next falls into a cooler which recovers most of its heat, and cools the clinker to around 100 °C, at which temperature it can be conveniently conveyed to storage. The cement kiln system is designed to accomplish these processes.

== Early history ==
Portland cement clinker was first made (in 1825) in a modified form of the traditional static lime kiln. The basic, egg-cup shaped lime kiln was provided with a conical or beehive shaped extension to increase draught and thus obtain the higher temperature needed to make cement clinker. For nearly half a century, this design, and minor modifications, remained the only method of manufacture. The kiln was restricted in size by the strength of the chunks of rawmix: if the charge in the kiln collapsed under its own weight, the kiln would be extinguished. For this reason, beehive kilns never made more than 30 tonnes of clinker per batch. A batch took one week to turn around: a day to fill the kiln, three days to burn off, two days to cool, and a day to unload. Thus, a kiln would produce about 1500 tonnes per year.

Around 1885, experiments began on design of continuous kilns. One design was the shaft kiln, similar in design to a blast furnace. Rawmix in the form of lumps and fuel were continuously added at the top, and clinker was continually withdrawn at the bottom. Air was blown through under pressure from the base to combust the fuel. The shaft kiln had a brief period of use before it was eclipsed by the rotary kiln, but it had a limited renaissance from 1970 onward in China and elsewhere, when it was used for small-scale, low-tech plants in rural areas away from transport routes. Several thousand such kilns were constructed in China. A typical shaft kiln produces 100-200 tonnes per day.

From 1885, trials began on the development of the rotary kiln, which today accounts for more than 95% of world production.

== The rotary kiln ==
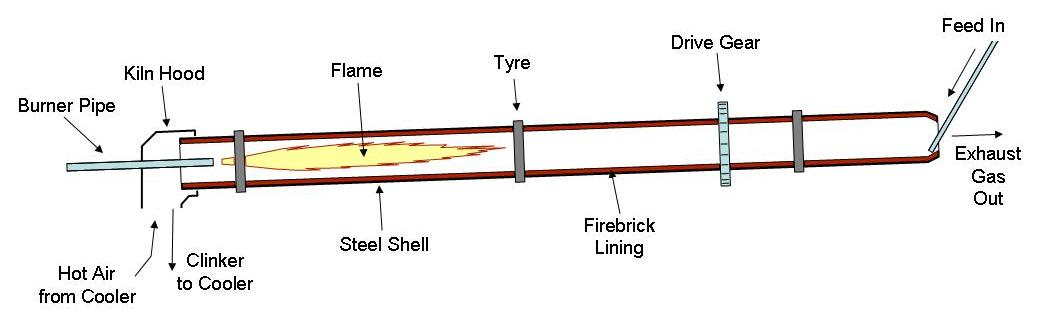
General layout of a rotary kiln

The rotary kiln consists of a tube made from steel plate, and lined with firebrick. The tube slopes slightly (1–4°) and slowly rotates on its axis at between 30 and 250 revolutions per hour. Rawmix is fed in at the upper end, and the rotation of the kiln causes it gradually to move downhill to the other end of the kiln. At the other end fuel, in the form of gas, oil, or pulverized solid fuel, is blown in through the "burner pipe", producing a large concentric flame in the lower part of the kiln tube. As material moves under the flame, it reaches its peak temperature, before dropping out of the kiln tube into the cooler. Air is drawn first through the cooler and then through the kiln for combustion of the fuel. In the cooler the air is heated by the cooling clinker, so that it may be 400 to 800 °C before it enters the kiln, thus causing intense and rapid combustion of the fuel.

The earliest successful rotary kilns were developed in Pennsylvania around 1890, based on a design by Frederick Ransome, and were about 1.5 m in diameter and 15 m in length. Such a kiln made about 20 tonnes of clinker per day. The fuel, initially, was oil, which was readily available in Pennsylvania at the time. It was particularly easy to get a good flame with this fuel. Within the next 10 years, the technique of firing by blowing in pulverized coal was developed, allowing the use of the cheapest available fuel. By 1905, the largest kilns were 2.7 x 60 m in size, and made 190 tonnes per day. At that date, after only 15 years of development, rotary kilns accounted for half of world production. Since then, the capacity of kilns has increased steadily, and the largest kilns today produce around 10,000 tonnes per day. In contrast to static kilns, the material passes through quickly: it takes from 3 hours (in some old wet process kilns) to as little as 10 minutes (in short precalciner kilns). Rotary kilns run 24 hours a day, and are typically stopped only for a few days once or twice a year for essential maintenance. One of the main maintenance works on rotary kilns is tyre and roller surface machining and grinding works which can be done while the kiln works in full operation at speeds up to 3.5 rpm. This is an important discipline, because heating up and cooling down are long, wasteful, and damaging processes. Uninterrupted runs as long as 18 months have been achieved.

== The wet process and the dry process ==
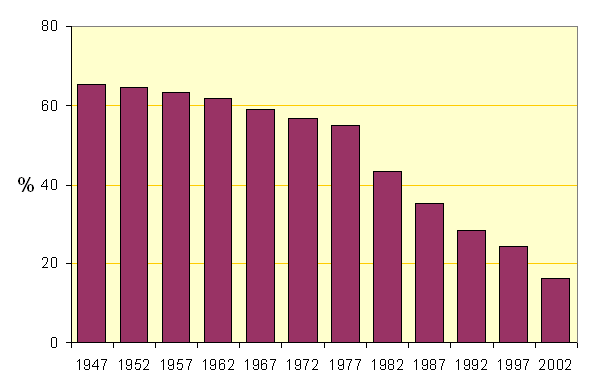
% of North American Capacity using Wet Process

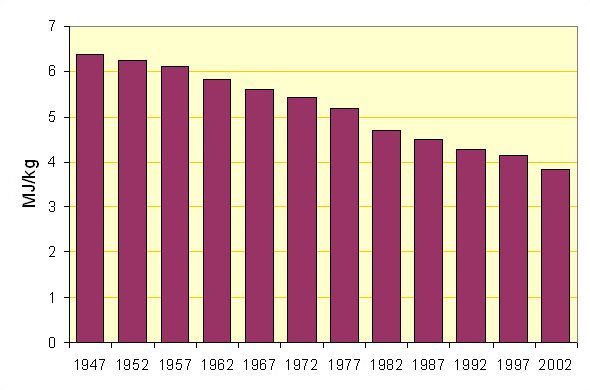
Mean Fuel Energy used in North American Kilns

From the earliest times, two different methods of rawmix preparation were used: the mineral components were either dry-ground to form a flour-like powder, or were wet-ground with added water to produce a fine slurry with the consistency of paint, and with a typical water content of 40–45%.

The wet process suffered the obvious disadvantage that, when the slurry was introduced into the kiln, a large amount of extra fuel was used in evaporating the water. Furthermore, a larger kiln was needed for a given clinker output, because much of the kiln's length was committed to the drying process. On the other hand, the wet process had a number of advantages. Wet grinding of hard minerals is usually much more efficient than dry grinding. When slurry is dried in the kiln, it forms a granular crumble that is ideal for subsequent heating in the kiln. In the dry process, it is very difficult to keep the fine powder rawmix in the kiln, because the fast-flowing combustion gases tend to blow it back out again. It became a practice to spray water into dry kilns in order to "damp down" the dry mix, and thus, for many years there was little difference in efficiency between the two processes, and the overwhelming majority of kilns used the wet process. By 1950, a typical large, wet process kiln, fitted with drying-zone heat exchangers, was 3.3 x 120 m in size, made 680 tonnes per day, and used about 0.25–0.30 tonnes of coal fuel for every tonne of clinker produced. Before the energy crisis of the 1970s put an end to new wet-process installations, kilns as large as 5.8 x 225 m in size were making 3000 tonnes per day.

An interesting footnote on the wet process history is that some manufacturers have in fact made very old wet process facilities profitable through the use of waste fuels. Plants that burn waste fuels enjoy a negative fuel cost (they are paid by industries needing to dispose of materials that have energy content and can be safely disposed of in the cement kiln thanks to its high temperatures and longer retention times). As a result, the inefficiency of the wet process is an advantage—to the manufacturer. By locating waste burning operations at older wet process locations, higher fuel consumption actually equates to higher profits for the manufacturer, although it produces correspondingly greater emission of CO_{2}. Manufacturers who think such emissions should be reduced are abandoning the use of wet process.

== Preheaters ==
In the 1930s, significantly, in Germany, the first attempts were made to redesign the kiln system to minimize waste of fuel. This led to two significant developments:

- the grate preheater
- the gas-suspension preheater.

=== Grate preheaters ===
The grate preheater consists of a chamber containing a chain-like high-temperature steel moving grate, attached to the cold end of the rotary kiln. A dry-powder rawmix is turned into a hard pellets of 10–20 mm diameter in a nodulizing pan, with the addition of 10-15% water. The pellets are loaded onto the moving grate, and the hot combustion gases from the rear of the kiln are passed through the bed of pellets from beneath. This dries and partially calcines the rawmix very efficiently. The pellets then drop into the kiln. Very little powdery material is blown out of the kiln. Because the rawmix is damped in order to make pellets, this is referred to as a "semi-dry" process. The grate preheater is also applicable to the "semi-wet" process, in which the rawmix is made as a slurry, which is first de-watered with a high-pressure filter, and the resulting "filter-cake" is extruded into pellets, which are fed to the grate. In this case, the water content of the pellets is 17-20%. Grate preheaters were most popular in the 1950s and 60s, when a typical system would have a grate 28 m long and 4 m wide, and a rotary kiln of 3.9 x 60 m, making 1050 tonnes per day, using about 0.11-0.13 tonnes of coal fuel for every tonne of clinker produced. Systems up to 3000 tonnes per day were installed.

=== Gas-suspension preheaters ===
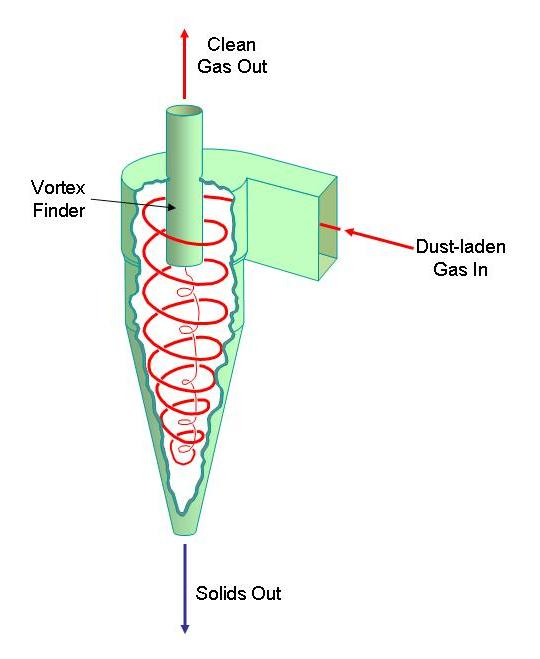
Cutaway view of cyclone showing air path

The key component of the gas-suspension preheater is the cyclone. A cyclone is a conical vessel into which a dust-bearing gas-stream is passed tangentially. This produces a vortex within the vessel. The gas leaves the vessel through a co-axial "vortex-finder". The solids are thrown to the outside edge of the vessel by centrifugal action, and leave through a valve in the vertex of the cone. Cyclones were originally used to clean up the dust-laden gases leaving simple dry process kilns. If, instead, the entire feed of rawmix is forced to pass through the cyclone, a very efficient heat exchange takes place: the gas is efficiently cooled, hence producing less waste of heat to the atmosphere, and the raw mix is efficiently heated. The heat transfer efficiency is further increased if a number of cyclones are connected in series.

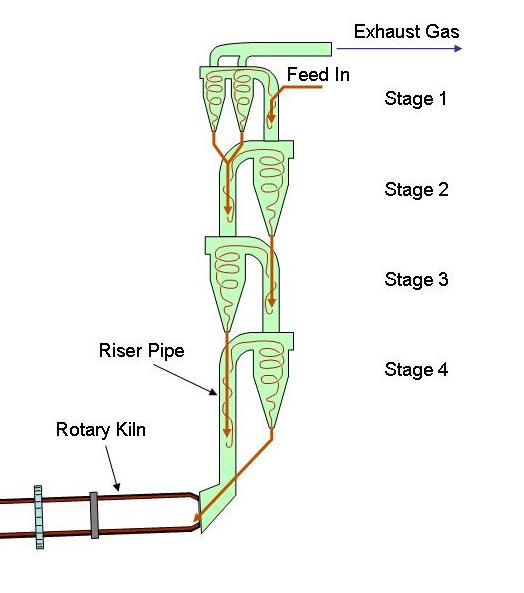
4-Stage preheater, showing path of feed

The number of cyclones stages used in practice varies from 1 to 6. Energy, in the form of fan-power, is required to draw the gases through the string of cyclones, and at a string of 6 cyclones, the cost of the added fan-power needed for an extra cyclone exceeds the efficiency advantage gained. It is normal to use the warm exhaust gas to dry the raw materials in the rawmill, and if the raw materials are wet, hot gas from a less efficient preheater is desirable. For this reason, the most commonly encountered suspension preheaters have 4 cyclones. The hot feed that leaves the base of the preheater string is typically 20% calcined, so the kiln has less subsequent processing to do, and can therefore achieve a higher specific output. Typical large systems installed in the early 1970s had cyclones 6 m in diameter, a rotary kiln of 5 x 75 m, making 2500 tonnes per day, using about 0.11-0.12 tonnes of coal fuel for every tonne of clinker produced.

A penalty paid for the efficiency of suspension preheaters is their tendency to block up. Salts, such as the sulfate and chloride of sodium and potassium, tend to evaporate in the burning zone of the kiln. They are carried back in vapor form, and re-condense when a sufficiently low temperature is encountered. Because these salts re-circulate back into the rawmix and re-enter the burning zone, a recirculation cycle establishes itself. A kiln with 0.1% chloride in the rawmix and clinker may have 5% chloride in the mid-kiln material. Condensation usually occurs in the preheater, and a sticky deposit of liquid salts glues dusty rawmix into a hard deposit, typically on surfaces against which the gas-flow is impacting. This can choke the preheater to the point that air-flow can no longer be maintained in the kiln. It then becomes necessary to manually break the build-up away. Modern installations often have automatic devices installed at vulnerable points to knock out build-up regularly. An alternative approach is to "bleed off" some of the kiln exhaust at the kiln inlet where the salts are still in the vapor phase, and remove and discard the solids in this. This is usually termed an "alkali bleed" and it breaks the recirculation cycle. It can also be of advantage for cement quality reasons, since it reduces the alkali content of the clinker. The alkali content is a critical property of cement. Indeed, cement with a too high alkali content can cause a harmful alkali–silica reaction (ASR) in concrete made with aggregates containing reactive amorphous silica. Hygroscopic and swelling sodium silicagel is formed inside the reactive aggregates which develop characteristic internal fissures. This expansive chemical reaction occurring in the concrete matrix generate high tensile stress in concrete and creates cracks that can ruin a concrete structure. However, hot gas is run to waste so the process is inefficient and increases kiln fuel consumption.

== Precalciners ==
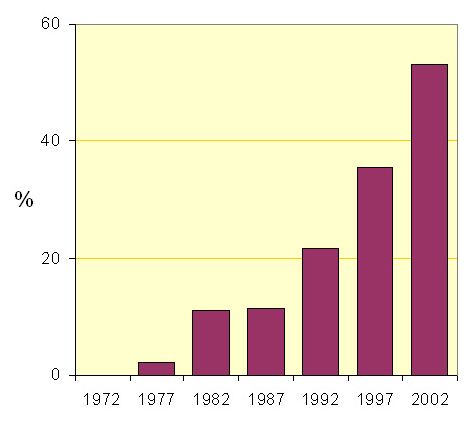
% of North American Capacity using Precalciners

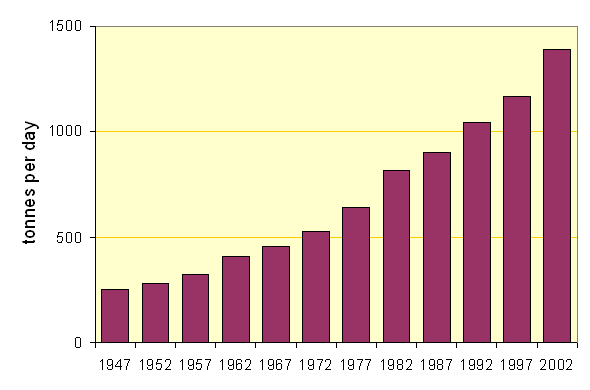
Mean Daily Output (tonnes) of North American Kilns

In the 1970s the precalciner was pioneered in Japan, and has subsequently become the equipment of choice for new large installations worldwide. The precalciner is a development of the suspension preheater. The philosophy is this: the amount of fuel that can be burned in the kiln is directly related to the size of the kiln. If part of the fuel necessary to burn the rawmix is burned outside the kiln, the output of the system can be increased for a given kiln size. Users of suspension preheaters found that output could be increased by injecting extra fuel into the base of the preheater. The logical development was to install a specially designed combustion chamber at the base of the preheater, into which pulverized coal is injected. This is referred to as an "air-through" precalciner, because the combustion air for both the kiln fuel and the calciner fuel all passes through the kiln. This kind of precalciner can burn up to 30% (typically 20%) of its fuel in the calciner. If more fuel were injected in the calciner, the extra amount of air drawn through the kiln would cool the kiln flame excessively. The feed is 40-60% calcined before it enters the rotary kiln.

The ultimate development is the "air-separate" precalciner, in which the hot combustion air for the calciner arrives in a duct directly from the cooler, bypassing the kiln. Typically, 60-75% of the fuel is burned in the precalciner. In these systems, the feed entering the rotary kiln is 100% calcined. The kiln has only to raise the feed to sintering temperature. In theory the maximum efficiency would be achieved if all the fuel were burned in the preheater, but the sintering operation involves partial melting and nodulization to make clinker, and the rolling action of the rotary kiln remains the most efficient way of doing this. Large modern installations typically have two parallel strings of 4 or 5 cyclones, with one attached to the kiln and the other attached to the precalciner chamber. A rotary kiln of 6 x 100 m makes 8,000–10,000 tonnes per day, using about 0.10-0.11 tonnes of coal fuel for every tonne of clinker produced. The kiln is dwarfed by the massive preheater tower and cooler in these installations. Such a kiln produces 3 million tonnes of clinker per year, and consumes 300,000 tonnes of coal. A diameter of 6 m appears to be the limit of size of rotary kilns, because the flexibility of the steel shell becomes unmanageable at or above this size, and the firebrick lining tends to fail when the kiln flexes.

A particular advantage of the air-separate precalciner is that a large proportion, or even 100%, of the alkali-laden kiln exhaust gas can be taken off as alkali bleed (see above). Because this accounts for only 40% of the system heat input, it can be done with lower heat wastage than in a simple suspension preheater bleed. Because of this, air-separate precalciners are now always prescribed when only high-alkali raw materials are available at a cement plant.

The accompanying figures show the movement towards the use of the more efficient processes in North America (for which data is readily available). But the average output per kiln in, for example, Thailand is twice that in North America.

== Ancillary equipment ==
Essential equipment in addition to the kiln tube and the preheater are:

- Cooler
- Fuel mills
- Fans
- Exhaust gas cleaning equipment.

=== Coolers ===
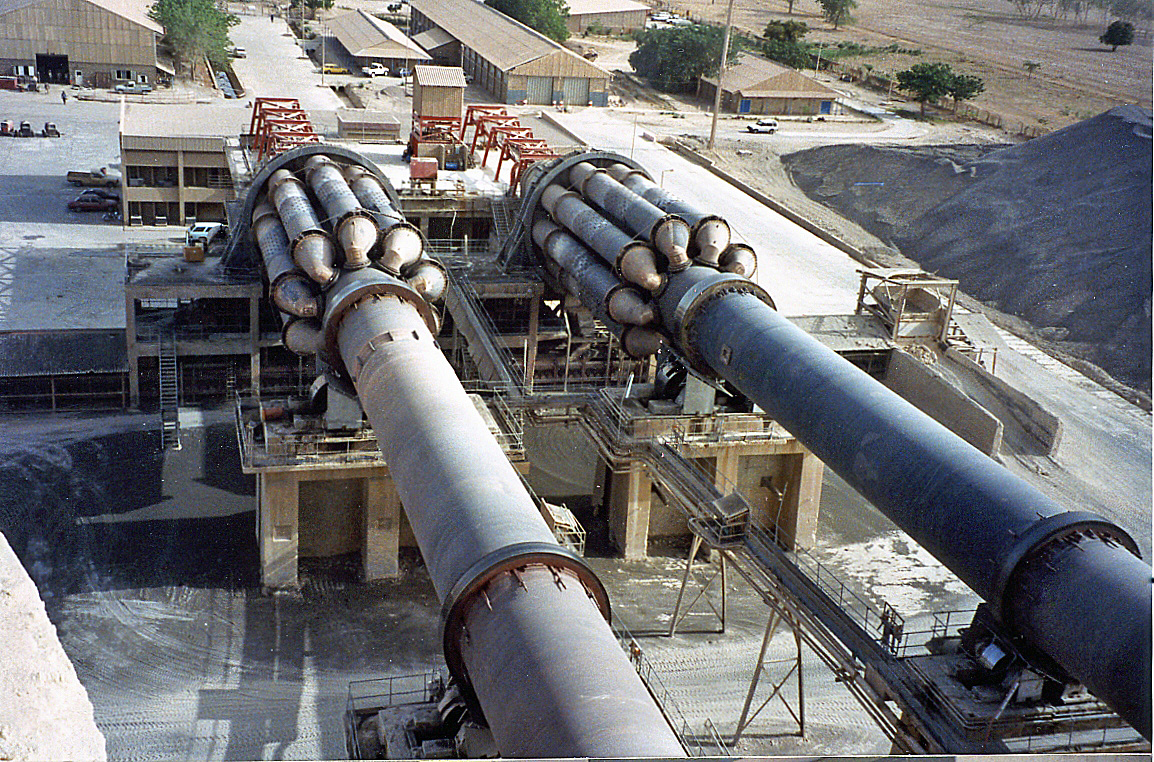
A pair of kilns with satellite coolers in Ashaka, Nigeria Sysy

Early systems used rotary coolers, which were rotating cylinders similar to the kiln, into which the hot clinker dropped. The combustion air was drawn up through the cooler as the clinker moved down, cascading through the air stream. In the 1920s, satellite coolers became common and remained in use until recently. These consist of a set (typically 7–9) of tubes attached to the kiln tube. They have the advantage that they are sealed to the kiln, and require no separate drive. From about 1930, the grate cooler was developed. This consists of a perforated grate through which cold air is blown, enclosed in a rectangular chamber. A bed of clinker up to 0.5 m deep moves along the grate. These coolers have two main advantages: (1) they cool the clinker rapidly, which is desirable from a clinker quality point of view; it avoids that alite (C_{3}S), thermodynamically unstable below 1250 °C, revert to belite (C_{2}S) and free CaO (C) on slow cooling:

C_{3}S → C_{2}S + C + heat (an exothermic reaction favored by the heat release),

(as alite is responsible for the early strength development in cement setting and hardening, the highest possible content of the clinker in alite is desirable)

and, (2) because they do not rotate, hot air can be ducted out of them for use in fuel drying, or for use as precalciner combustion air. The latter advantage means that they have become the only type used in modern systems .

=== Fuel mills ===
Fuel systems are divided into two categories:

- Direct firing
- Indirect firing

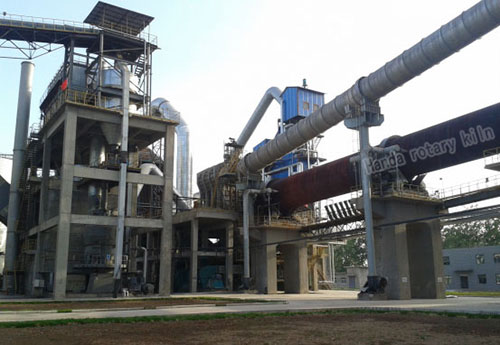
Cement plant

In direct firing, the fuel is fed at a controlled rate to the fuel mill, and the fine product is immediately blown into the kiln. The advantage of this system is that it is not necessary to store the hazardous ground fuel: it is used as soon as it is made. For this reason it was the system of choice for older kilns. A disadvantage is that the fuel mill has to run all the time: if it breaks down, the kiln has to stop if no backup system is available.

In indirect firing, the fuel is ground by an intermittently run mill, and the fine product is stored in a silo of sufficient size to supply the kiln though fuel mill stoppage periods. The fine fuel is metered out of the silo at a controlled rate and blown into the kiln. This method is now favoured for precalciner systems, because both the kiln and the precalciner can be fed with fuel from the same system. Special techniques are required to store the fine fuel safely, and coals with high volatiles are normally milled in an inert atmosphere (e.g. CO_{2}).

=== Fans ===
A large volume of gases has to be moved through the kiln system. Particularly in suspension preheater systems, a high degree of suction has to be developed at the exit of the system to drive this. Fans are also used to force air through the cooler bed, and to propel the fuel into the kiln. Fans account for most of the electric power consumed in the system, typically amounting to 10–15 kW·h per tonne of clinker.

=== Gas cleaning ===
The exhaust gases from a modern kiln typically amount to 2 tonnes (or 1500 cubic metres at STP) per tonne of clinker made. The gases carry a large amount of dust—typically 30 grams per cubic metre. Environmental regulations specific to different countries require that this be reduced to (typically) 0.1 gram per cubic metre, so dust capture needs to be at least 99.7% efficient. Methods of capture include electrostatic precipitators and bag-filters. See also cement kiln emissions.

== Kiln fuels ==
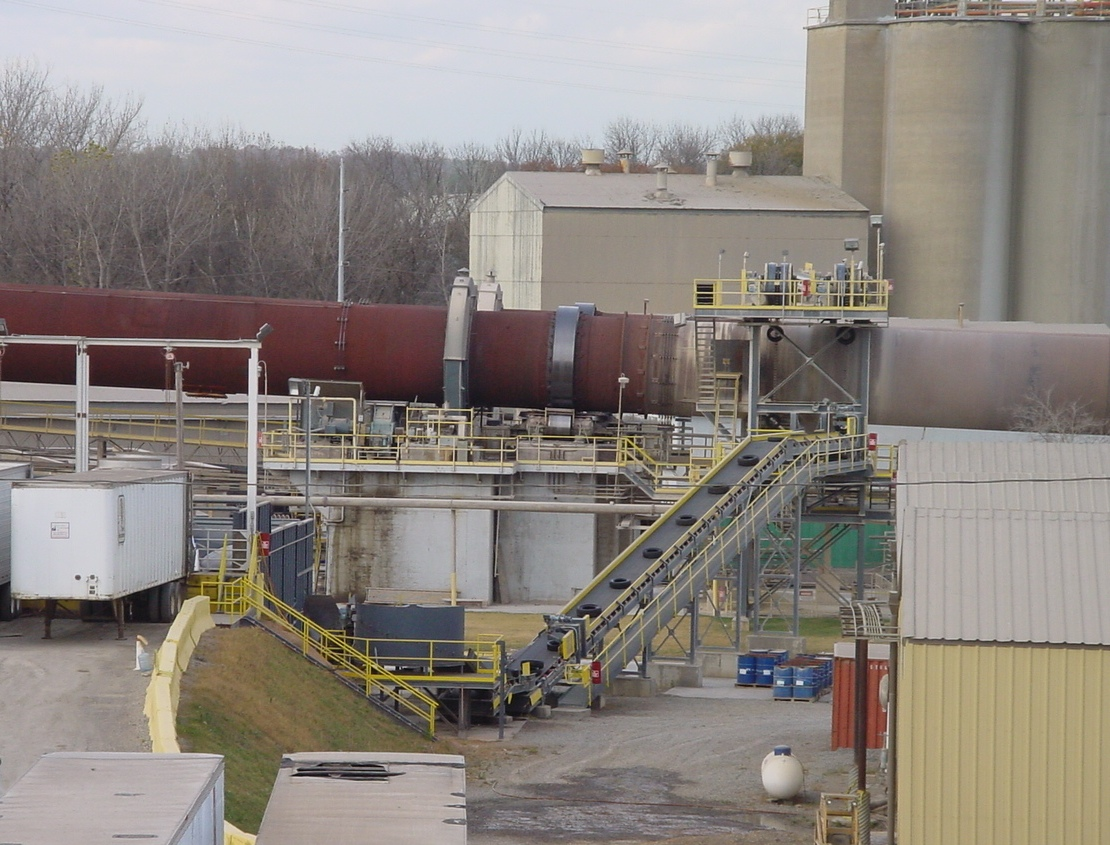
Used tires being fed mid-kiln to a pair of long kilns

Fuels that have been used for primary firing include coal, petroleum coke, heavy fuel oil, natural gas, landfill off-gas and oil refinery flare gas. Because the clinker is brought to its peak temperature mainly by radiant heat transfer, and a bright (i.e. high emissivity) and hot flame is essential for this, high carbon fuels such as coal which produces a luminous flame are often preferred for kiln firing. Where it is cheap and readily available, natural gas is also sometimes used. However, because it produces a much less luminous flame, it tends to result in lower kiln output.

=== Alternative fuels ===
In addition to these primary fuels, various combustible waste materials have been fed to kilns. These alternative fuels (AF) include:

- Used motor-vehicle tires
- Sewage sludge
- Agricultural waste
- Landfill gas
- Refuse-derived fuel (RDF)
- Chemical and other hazardous waste

Cement kilns are an attractive way of disposing of hazardous materials, because of:

- the temperatures in the kiln, which are much higher than in other combustion systems (e.g. incinerators),
- the alkaline conditions in the kiln, afforded by the high-calcium rawmix, which can absorb acidic combustion products,
- the ability of the clinker to absorb heavy metals into its structure.

A notable example is the use of scrapped motor-vehicle tires, which are very difficult to dispose of by other means. Whole tires are commonly introduced in the kiln by rolling them into the upper end of a preheater kiln, or by dropping them through a slot midway along a long wet kiln. In either case, the high gas temperatures (1000–1200 °C) cause almost instantaneous, complete and smokeless combustion of the tire. Alternatively, tires are chopped into 5–10 mm chips, in which form they can be injected into a precalciner combustion chamber. The steel and zinc in the tires become chemically incorporated into the clinker, partially replacing iron that must otherwise be fed as raw material.

A high level of monitoring of both the fuel and its combustion products is necessary to maintain safe operation.

For maximum kiln efficiency, high quality conventional fuels are the best choice. However, burning any fuels, especially hazardous waste materials, can result in toxic emissions. Thus, it is necessary for operators of cement kilns to closely monitor many process variables to ensure emissions are continuously minimized. In the U.S., cement kilns are regulated as a major source of air pollution by the EPA and must meet stringent air pollution control requirements.

== Kiln control ==
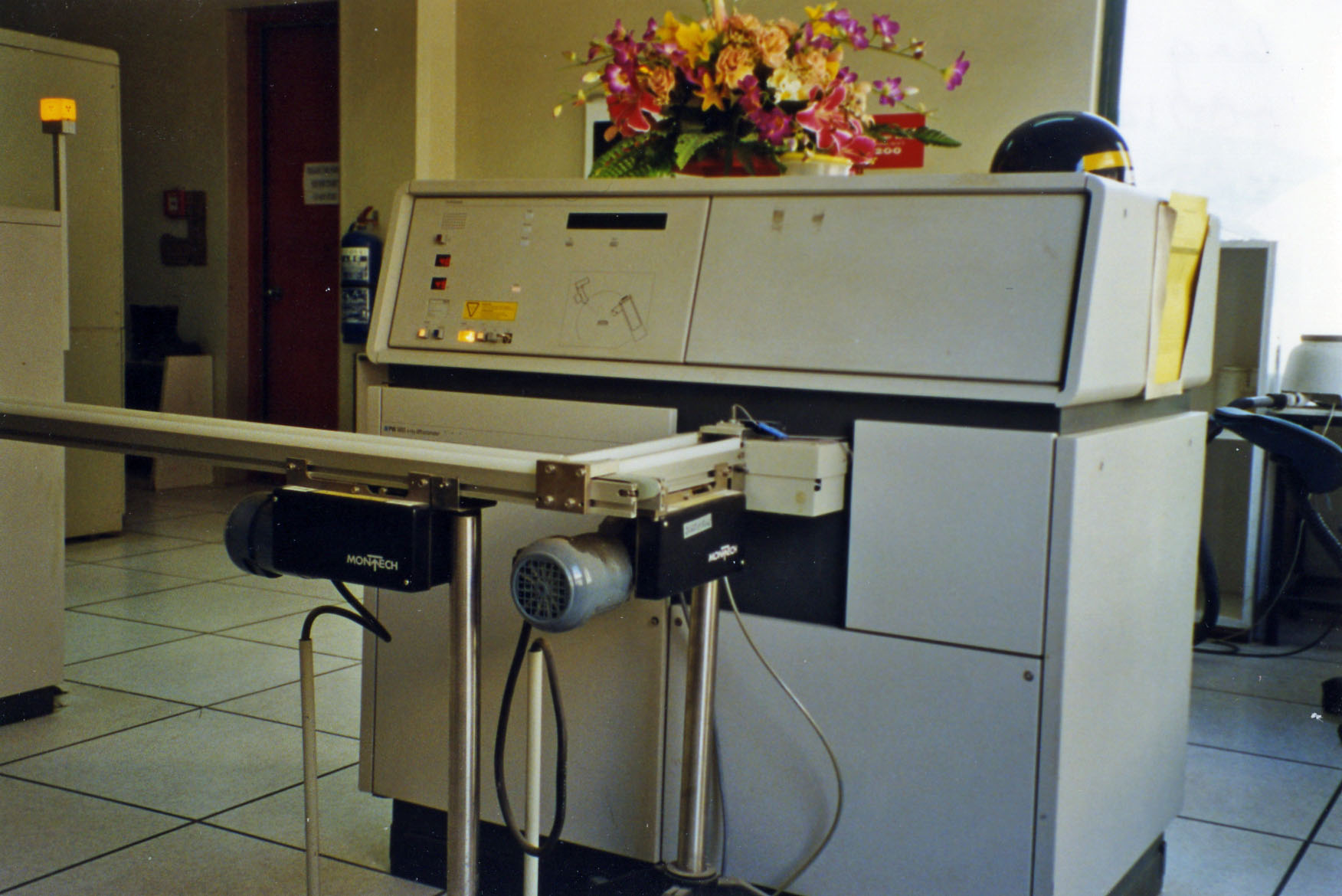
Online X-ray diffraction with automatic sample feed for free calcium oxide measurement

The objective of kiln operation is to make clinker with the required chemical and physical properties, at the maximum rate that the size of kiln will allow, while meeting environmental standards, at the lowest possible operating cost. The kiln is very sensitive to control strategies, and a poorly run kiln can easily double cement plant operating costs.

Formation of the desired clinker minerals involves heating the rawmix through the temperature stages mentioned above. The finishing transformation that takes place in the hottest part of the kiln, under the flame, is the reaction of belite (C_{2}S = 2CaO·SiO_{2}, or Ca_{2}SiO_{4}) with calcium oxide to form alite (C_{3}S = 3CaO·SiO_{2}, or Ca_{3}SiO_{5}):

Ca_{2}SiO_{4} + CaO → Ca_{3}SiO_{5}

Also abbreviated in the cement chemist notation (CCN) as:

C_{2}S + C → C_{3}S (endothermic reaction favored by a higher temperature)

Tricalcium silicate (C_{3}S, alite, Ca_{3}SiO_{5}) is thermodynamically unstable below 1250 °C, but can be preserved in a metastable state at room temperature by fast cooling (quenching): on slow cooling it tends to revert to belite (Ca_{2}SiO_{4}) and CaO.

If the reaction is incomplete, excessive amounts of free calcium oxide remain in the clinker. Regular measurement of the free CaO content is used as a means of tracking the clinker quality. As a parameter in kiln control, free CaO data is somewhat ineffective because, even with fast automated sampling and analysis, the data, when it arrives, may be 10 minutes "out of date", and more immediate data must be used for minute-to-minute control.

Conversion of belite to alite requires partial melting, the resulting liquid being the solvent in which the reaction takes place. The amount of liquid, and hence the speed of the finishing reaction, is related to temperature. To meet the clinker quality objective, the most obvious control is that the clinker should reach a peak temperature such that the finishing reaction takes place to the required degree. A further reason to maintain constant liquid formation in the hot end of the kiln is that the sintering material forms a dam that prevents the cooler upstream feed from flooding out of the kiln. The feed in the calcining zone, because it is a powder evolving carbon dioxide, is extremely fluid. Cooling of the burning zone, and loss of unburned material into the cooler, is called "flushing", and in addition to causing lost production can cause massive damage.

However, for efficient operation, steady conditions need to be maintained throughout the whole kiln system. The feed at each stage must be at a temperature such that it is "ready" for processing in the next stage. To ensure this, the temperature of both feed and gas must be optimized and maintained at every point. The external controls available to achieve this are few:

- Feed rate: this defines the kiln output
- Rotary kiln speed: this controls the rate at which the feed moves through the kiln tube
- Fuel injection rate: this controls the rate at which the "hot end" of the system is heated
- Exhaust fan speed or power: this controls gas flow, and the rate at which heat is drawn from the "hot end" of the system to the "cold end"

In the case of precalciner kilns, further controls are available:

- Independent control of fuel to kiln and calciner
- Independent fan controls where there are multiple preheater strings.

The independent use of fan speed and fuel rate is constrained by the fact that there must always be sufficient oxygen available to burn the fuel, and in particular, to burn carbon to carbon dioxide. If carbon monoxide is formed, this represents a waste of fuel, and also indicates reducing conditions within the kiln which must be avoided at all costs since it causes destruction of the clinker mineral structure. For this reason, the exhaust gas is continually analyzed for O_{2}, CO, NO and SO_{2}.

The assessment of the clinker peak temperature has always been problematic. Contact temperature measurement is impossible because of the chemically aggressive and abrasive nature of the hot clinker, and optical methods such as infrared pyrometry are difficult because of the dust and fume-laden atmosphere in the burning zone. The traditional method of assessment was to view the bed of clinker and deduce the amount of liquid formation by experience. As more liquid forms, the clinker becomes stickier, and the bed of material climbs higher up the rising side of the kiln. It is usually also possible to assess the length of the zone of liquid formation, beyond which powdery "fresh" feed can be seen. Cameras, with or without infrared measurement capability, are mounted on the kiln hood to facilitate this. On many kilns, the same information can be inferred from the kiln motor power drawn, since sticky feed riding high on the kiln wall increases the eccentric turning load of the kiln. Further information can be obtained from the exhaust gas analyzers. The formation of NO from nitrogen and oxygen takes place only at high temperatures, and so the NO level gives an indication of the combined feed and flame temperature. SO_{2} is formed by thermal decomposition of calcium sulfate in the clinker, and so also gives an indication of clinker temperature. Modern computer control systems usually make a "calculated" temperature, using contributions from all these information sources, and then set about controlling it.

As an exercise in process control, kiln control is extremely challenging, because of multiple inter-related variables, non-linear responses, and variable process lags. Computer control systems were first tried in the early 1960s, initially with poor results due mainly to poor process measurements. Since 1990, complex high-level supervisory control systems have been standard on new installations. These operate using expert system strategies, that maintain a "just sufficient" burning zone temperature, below which the kiln's operating condition will deteriorate catastrophically, thus requiring rapid-response, "knife-edge" control.

== Cement kiln emissions ==
Emissions from cement works are determined both by continuous and discontinuous measuring methods, which are described in corresponding national guidelines and standards. Continuous measurement is primarily used for dust (particulates), NO_{x} (nitrogen oxides) and SO_{2} (sulfur dioxide), while the remaining parameters relevant pursuant to ambient pollution legislation are usually determined discontinuously by individual measurements.

The following descriptions of emissions refer to modern kiln plants based on dry process technology.

=== Carbon dioxide ===
During the clinker burning process CO_{2} is emitted. CO_{2} accounts for the main share of these gases. CO_{2} emissions are both raw material-related and energy-related. Raw material-related emissions are produced during limestone decarbonation (CaCO_{3} → CaO + CO_{2}) and account for about half of total CO_{2} emissions. Use of fuels with higher hydrogen content than coal and use of alternative fuels can reduce net greenhouse gas emissions.

=== Dust ===
To manufacture 1 t of Portland cement, about 1.5 to 1.7 t raw materials, 0.1 t coal and 1 t clinker (besides other cement constituents and sulfate agents) must be ground to dust fineness during production. In this process, the steps of raw material processing, fuel preparation, clinker burning and cement grinding constitute major emission sources for particulate components. While particulate emissions of up to 3,000 mg/m^{3} were measured leaving the stack of cement rotary kiln plants as recently as in the 1960s, legal limits are typically 30 mg/m^{3} today, and much lower levels are achievable.

=== Nitrogen oxides (NO_{x}) ===
The clinker burning process is a high-temperature process resulting in the formation of nitrogen oxides (NO_{x}). The amount formed is directly related to the main flame temperature (typically 1850–2000 °C). Nitrogen monoxide (NO) accounts for about 95%, and nitrogen dioxide (NO_{2}) for about 5% of this compound present in the exhaust gas of rotary kiln plants. As most of the NO is converted to NO_{2} in the atmosphere, emissions are given as NO_{2} per cubic metre exhaust gas.

Without reduction measures, process-related NO_{x} contents in the exhaust gas of rotary kiln plants would in most cases considerably exceed the specifications of e.g. European legislation for waste burning plants (0.50 g/m^{3} for new plants and 0.80 g/m^{3} for existing plants). Reduction measures are aimed at smoothing and optimising plant operation. Technically, staged combustion and Selective Non-Catalytic NO Reduction (SNCR) are applied to cope with the emission limit values.

High process temperatures are required to convert the raw material mix to Portland cement clinker. Kiln charge temperatures in the sintering zone of rotary kilns range at around 1450 °C. To reach these, flame temperatures of about 2000 °C are necessary. For reasons of clinker quality the burning process takes place under oxidising conditions, under which the partial oxidation of the molecular nitrogen in the combustion air resulting in the formation of nitrogen monoxide (NO) dominates. This reaction is also called thermal NO formation. At the lower temperatures prevailing in a precalciner, however, thermal NO formation is negligible: here, the nitrogen bound in the fuel can result in the formation of what is known as fuel-related NO. Staged combustion is used to reduce NO: calciner fuel is added with insufficient combustion air. This causes CO to form.
The CO then reduces the NO into molecular nitrogen:

2 CO + 2 NO → 2 CO_{2} + N_{2}.

Hot tertiary air is then added to oxidize the remaining CO.

=== Sulfur dioxide (SO_{2}) ===
Sulfur is input into the clinker burning process via raw materials and fuels. Depending on their origin, the raw materials may contain sulfur bound as sulfide or sulfate. Higher SO_{2} emissions by rotary kiln systems in the cement industry are often attributable to the sulfides contained in the raw material, which become oxidised to form SO_{2} at the temperatures between 370 °C and 420 °C prevailing in the kiln preheater. Most of the sulfides are pyrite or marcasite contained in the raw materials. Given the sulfide concentrations found e.g. in German raw material deposits, SO_{2} emission concentrations can total up to 1.2 g/m^{3} depending on the site location. In some cases, injected calcium hydroxide is used to lower SO_{2} emissions.

The sulfur input with the fuels is completely converted to SO_{2} during combustion in the rotary kiln. In the preheater and the kiln, this SO_{2} reacts to form alkali sulfates, which are bound in the clinker, provided that oxidizing conditions are maintained in the kiln.

=== Carbon monoxide (CO) and total carbon ===
The exhaust gas concentrations of CO and organically bound carbon are a yardstick for the burn-out rate of the fuels utilised in energy conversion plants, such as power stations. By contrast, the clinker burning process is a material conversion process that must always be operated with excess air for reasons of clinker quality. In concert with long residence times in the high-temperature range, this leads to complete fuel burn-up.

The emissions of CO and organically bound carbon during the clinker burning process are caused by the small quantities of organic constituents input via the natural raw materials (remnants of organisms and plants incorporated in the rock in the course of geological history). These are converted during kiln feed preheating and become oxidized to form CO and CO_{2}. In this process, small portions of organic trace gases (total organic carbon) are formed as well. In case of the clinker burning process, the content of CO and organic trace gases in the clean gas therefore may not be directly related to combustion conditions. The amount of released CO_{2} is about half a ton per ton of clinker.

=== Dioxins and furans (PCDD/F) ===
Rotary kilns of the cement industry and classic incineration plants mainly differ in terms of the combustion conditions prevailing during clinker burning. Kiln feed and rotary kiln exhaust gases are conveyed in counter-flow and mixed thoroughly. Thus, temperature distribution and residence time in rotary kilns afford particularly favourable conditions for organic compounds, introduced either via fuels or derived from them, to be completely destroyed. For that reason, only very low concentrations of polychlorinated dibenzo-p-dioxins and dibenzofurans (colloquially "dioxins and furans") can be found in the exhaust gas from cement rotary kilns.

=== Polychlorinated biphenyls (PCB) ===
The emission behaviour of PCB is comparable to that of dioxins and furans. PCB may be introduced into the process via alternative raw materials and fuels. The rotary kiln systems of the cement industry destroy these trace components virtually completely.

=== Polycyclic aromatic hydrocarbons (PAH) ===
PAHs (according to EPA 610) in the exhaust gas of rotary kilns usually appear at a distribution dominated by naphthalene, which accounts for a share of more than 90% by mass. The rotary kiln systems of the cement industry destroy virtually completely the PAHs input via fuels. Emissions are generated from organic constituents in the raw material.

=== Benzene, toluene, ethylbenzene, xylene (BTEX) ===
As a rule benzene, toluene, ethylbenzene and xylene are present in the exhaust gas of rotary kilns in a characteristic ratio. BTEX is formed during the thermal decomposition of organic raw material constituents in the preheater.

=== Gaseous inorganic chlorine compounds (HCl) ===
Chlorides are a minor additional constituents contained in the raw materials and fuels of the clinker burning process. They are released when the fuels are burnt or the kiln feed is heated, and primarily react with the alkalis from the kiln feed to form alkali chlorides. These compounds, which are initially vaporous, condense on the kiln feed or the kiln dust, at temperatures between 700 °C and 900 °C, subsequently re-enter the rotary kiln system and evaporate again. This cycle in the area between the rotary kiln and the preheater can result in coating formation. A bypass at the kiln inlet allows effective reduction of alkali chloride cycles and to diminish coating build-up problems. During the clinker burning process, gaseous inorganic chlorine compounds are either not emitted at all, or in very small quantities only.

=== Gaseous inorganic fluorine compounds (HF) ===
Of the fluorine present in rotary kilns, 90 to 95% is bound in the clinker, and the remainder is bound with dust in the form of calcium fluoride stable under the conditions of the burning process. Ultra-fine dust fractions that pass through the measuring gas filter may give the impression of low contents of gaseous fluorine compounds in rotary kiln systems of the cement industry.

=== Trace elements and heavy metals ===
The emission behaviour of the individual elements in the clinker burning process is determined by the input scenario, the behaviour in the plant and the precipitation efficiency of the dust collection device. The trace elements (e.g., heavy metals) introduced into the burning process via the raw materials and fuels may evaporate completely or partially in the hot zones of the preheater and/or rotary kiln depending on their volatility, react with the constituents present in the gas phase, and condense on the kiln feed in the cooler sections of the kiln system. Depending on the volatility and the operating conditions, this may result in the formation of cycles that are either restricted to the kiln and the preheater or include the combined drying and grinding plant as well. Trace elements from the fuels initially enter the combustion gases, but are emitted to an extremely small extent only owing to the retention capacity of the kiln and the preheater.

Under the conditions prevailing in the clinker burning process, non-volatile elements (e.g. arsenic, vanadium, nickel) are completely bound in the clinker.

Elements such as lead and cadmium preferentially react with the excess chlorides and sulfates in the section between the rotary kiln and the preheater, forming volatile compounds. Owing to the large surface area available, these compounds condense on the kiln feed particles at temperatures between 700 °C and 900 °C. In this way, the volatile elements accumulated in the kiln-preheater system are precipitated again in the cyclone preheater, remaining almost completely in the clinker.

Thallium (as the chloride) condenses in the upper zone of the cyclone preheater at temperatures between 450 °C and 500 °C. As a consequence, a cycle can be formed between preheater, raw material drying and exhaust gas purification.

Mercury and its compounds are not precipitated in the kiln and the preheater. They condense on the exhaust gas route due to the cooling of the gas and are partially adsorbed by the raw material particles. This portion is precipitated in the kiln exhaust gas filter.

Owing to trace element behaviour during the clinker burning process and the high precipitation efficiency of the dust collection devices, trace element emission concentrations are on a low overall level.
