= Rawmill =

Type of industrial equipment

In cement manufacturing, a raw mill is a type of industrial equipment used to crush, grind, and proportion raw materials into a uniform mixture known as raw meal (or rawmix), which is subsequently processed in a cement kiln to produce clinker, which is then ground to make cement in the cement mill.

The raw milling stage of the process effectively defines the chemistry (and therefore physical properties) of the finished cement, and has a large effect upon the efficiency of the whole manufacturing process.

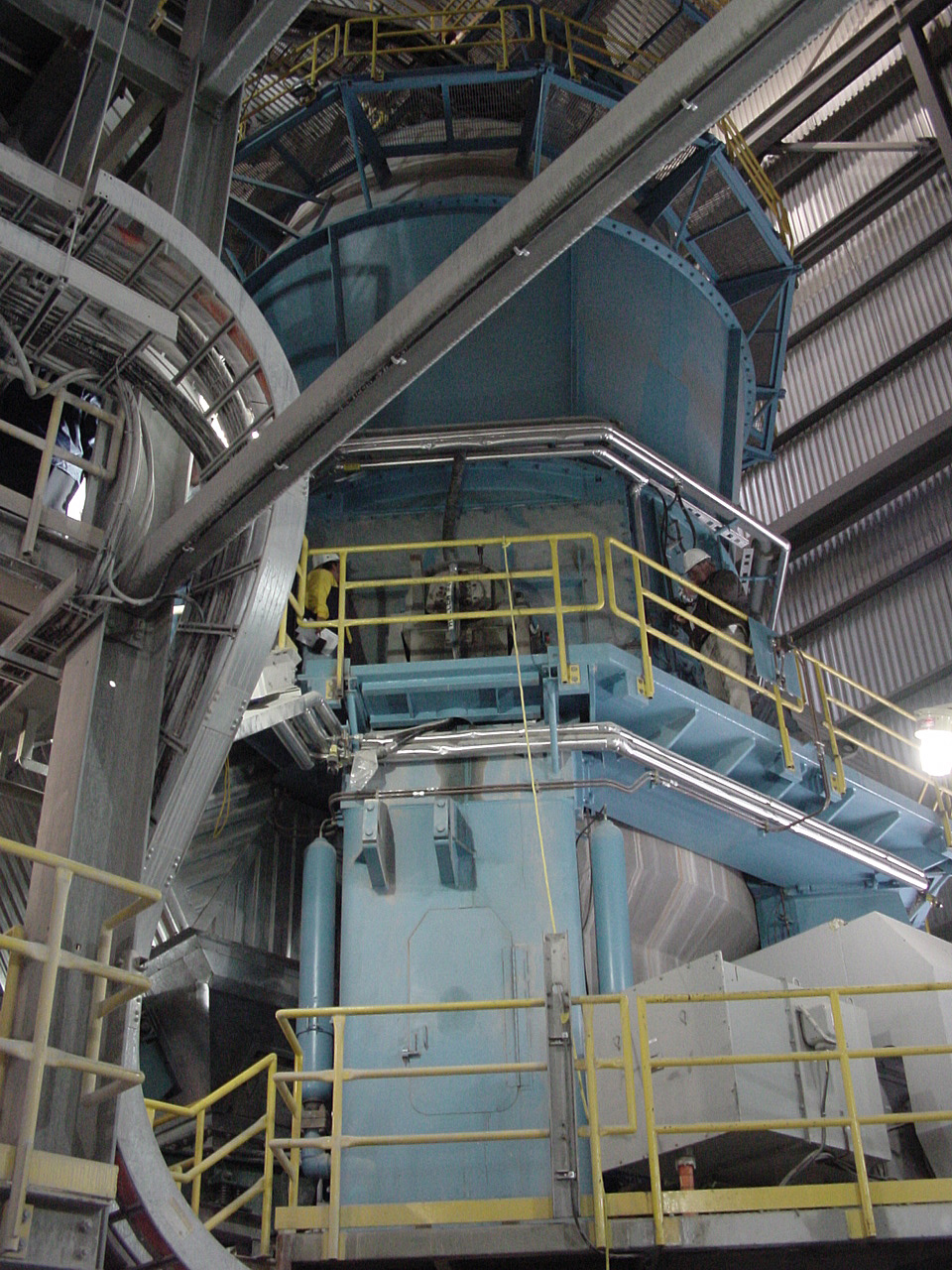
A medium-sized dry process roller mill

== History ==
The history of the development of the technology of raw material grinding defines the early history of cement technology. Other stages of cement manufacture used existing technology in the early days. Early hydraulic materials such as hydraulic limes, natural cements and Parker's Roman cement were all based on "natural" raw materials, burned "as-dug". Because these natural blends of minerals occur only rarely, manufacturers were interested in making a fine-grained artificial mixture of readily available minerals such as limestone and clay that could be used in the same way. A typical problem would be to make an intimate mixture of 75% chalk and 25% clay, and burn this to produce an ”artificial cement". The development of the "wet" method of producing fine-grained clay in the ceramics industry afforded a means of doing this. For this reason, the early cement industry used the "wet process", in which the raw materials are ground together with water, to produce a slurry, containing 20–50% water. Both Louis Vicat and James Frost used this technique in the early 19th century, and it remained the only way of making rawmix for Portland cement until 1890. A modification of the technique used by the early industry was "double-burning", in which a hard limestone would be burned and slaked before combining with clay slurry. This technique avoided the grinding of hard stone, and was employed by, among others, Joseph Aspdin. Early grinding technology was poor, and early slurries were made thin, with a high water content. The slurry was then allowed to stand in large reservoirs ("slurry-backs") for several weeks. Large, un-ground particles would drop to the bottom, and excess water rose to the top. The water was periodically decanted until a stiff cake, of the consistency of pottery clay, was left. This was sliced up, discarding the coarse material at the bottom, and burned in the kiln. Wet grinding is comparatively energy-efficient, and so when good dry-grinding equipment became available, the wet process continued in use throughout the 20th century, often employing equipment that Josiah Wedgwood would have recognized.

== Materials ground ==
Rawmixes are formulated to contain a correctly balanced chemistry for the production of calcium silicates (alite and belite) and fluxes (aluminate and ferrite) in the kiln. Chemical analysis data in cement manufacture are expressed in terms of oxides, and the most important of these in rawmix design are SiO_{2}, Al_{2}O_{3}, Fe_{2}O_{3} and CaO. In principle, any material that can contribute any of these oxides can be used as a rawmix component. Because the major oxide required is CaO, the most prevalent rawmix component is limestone, while the others are mostly contributed by clay or shale. Minor adjustments to the chemistry are made by smaller additions of materials such as those shown below.

Typical rawmix component chemical analyses:

Oxide	Gray Limestone	White Limestone	Marl	Clay	Sand	Millscale	Kaolin	Bauxite	Fly ash
SiO_{2}	6.6	2.1	14.1	61.6	98.0	1.3	46.1	11.1	48.1
Al_{2}O_{3}	1.5	0.3	3.3	17.5	0.9	1.2	38.5	54.4	26.5
Fe_{2}O_{3}	0.7	0.13	1.3	7.5	0.13	96.8	0.35	9.7	6
CaO	48.4	53.7	43.8	1.1	0.1	0.3	0.3	0.6	4.7
MgO	2.0	0.8	0.7	1.1	0.0	0.6	0.1	0.1	1.2
Na_{2}O	0.07	0.02	0.07	0.5	0.02	0.11	0.01	0.05	0.3
K_{2}O	0.27	0.08	0.43	1.9	0.37	0.05	0.09	0.05	1.3
TiO_{2}	0.06	0.02	0.15	0.8	0.06	0.30	0.9	2.1	1.5
Mn_{2}O_{3}	0.03	0.01	0.02	0.12	0	0.63	0	0.09	0.07
LoI_{950}	40.0	42.7	35.8	6.8	0.3	0	13.7	20.8	9.1

Note: LoI_{950} is the Loss on ignition at 950 °C, and represents (approximately) the components lost during kiln processing. It consists mainly of CO_{2} from carbonates, H_{2}O from clay hydrates, and organic carbon.

Using these materials, typical rawmixes could be composed:

- Mix 1: General-purpose cement: 88.0% gray limestone, 8.9% clay, 2.2% sand and 0.9% millscale.
- Mix 2: Sulfate-resisting cement: 87.6% gray limestone, 5.2% clay, 5.0% sand and 2.2% millscale.
- Mix 3: White cement: 82.3% white limestone, 6.8% kaolin and 10.9% sand.

The chemical analyses of these rawmixes would be:

Oxide	Mix 1	Mix 2	Mix 3
SiO_{2}	13.46	13.91	15.55
Al_{2}O_{3}	2.91	2.30	2.96
Fe_{2}O_{3}	2.16	3.14	0.14
CaO	42.69	42.47	44.23
MgO	1.86	1.82	0.67
Na_{2}O	0.11	0.09	0.02
K_{2}O	0.41	0.35	0.11
TiO_{2}	0.13	0.10	0.09
Mn_{2}O_{3}	0.04	0.05	0.01
LoI_{950}	35.8	35.4	36.1

The raw materials and mixes shown are only "typical": considerable variations are possible depending on the raw materials available.

== Control of minor elements ==
Apart from the major oxides (CaO, SiO_{2}, Al_{2}O_{3} and Fe_{2}O_{3}) the minor oxides are, at best, diluents of the clinker, and may be deleterious. However, cement raw materials are for the most part dug from the Earth's crust and contain most of the elements in the periodic table in some amount. The manufacturer therefore selects materials so that the deleterious effects of minor elements are minimized or kept under control. Minor elements that are frequently encountered are as follows:

- Fluorine is beneficial to the kiln process in that it allows alite to form at lower temperature. However, at levels above 0.25% in the clinker, delayed and erratic cement setting time results.
- Alkali metals (primarily sodium and potassium) cause processing problems because they form volatile salts in the kiln system. These evaporate in the kiln burning zone and re-condense in the cooler regions of the preheater, causing blockages. Alkalis are also deleterious to concrete, potentially causing alkali silica reaction. For this reason, many standards limit alkalis (typically expressed as "total equivalent soda" which is Na_{2}O + 0.658 K_{2}O). Typical specification limits are in the range 0.5–0.8%.
- MgO causes problems at levels over 2.5%. Small amounts are accommodated in solid solution in the clinker minerals, but above 2.5%, "free" MgO exists in the clinker as periclase. This can slowly hydrate to Mg(OH)_{2} with expansion in the hardened concrete, causing cracking. Careful processing of the clinker to keep the periclase in a microcrystalline form allows levels up to 5% to be managed without serious effect. All standards limit MgO, typical limits being in the range 4-6%.
- P_{2}O_{5} at levels above 0.5% starts to cause slow setting and low clinker reactivity.
- Chlorine produces very volatile salts and consequent preheater blockages, and is usually limited to below 0.1% in rawmix.
- TiO_{2} is ubiquitous, but is rarely present at levels (~1%) that might cause problems.
- Chromium can end up as chromates (Cr[VI]) in cement, particularly when the clinker is high in sulfate. Chromates cause allergic contact dermatitis in cement users, and for this reason cement Cr[VI] content is limited in many standards to 0.0002%. Typical natural rawmixes contain around 0.01% Cr_{2}O_{3}, and at this level, Cr[VI] formation can be controlled. Chromium present in the cement as Cr[III] is of no consequence.
- Mn_{2}O_{3} is not deleterious, acting as a substitute for iron. But it contributes more color to the cement than iron, and high-Mn_{2}O_{3} cements (>1%) are almost black.
- ZnO is encountered in some rawmix additives (as well as tires used as kiln fuel). At levels above 0.2%, it causes slow setting and low clinker reactivity.
- Strontium and barium act as calcium replacements, and only start to reduce clinker reactivity at levels of 1.5% and 0.2% respectively.
- Toxic heavy metals: among these, low levels of arsenic, selenium, cadmium, antimony and tungsten are not a problem, because they are absorbed in the basic clinker structure as anions. On the other hand, mercury, thallium and lead must be carefully controlled because they can be emitted as volatile halides in the kiln exhaust.

== Wet rawmills ==
Wet grinding is more efficient than dry grinding because water coats the newly formed surfaces of broken particles and prevents re-agglomeration. The process of blending and homogenizing the rawmix is also much easier when it is in slurry form. The disadvantage is that the water in the resultant slurry has to be removed subsequently, and this usually requires a lot of energy. While energy was cheap, wet grinding was common, but since 1970 the situation has changed dramatically, and new wet process plant is now rarely installed. Wet grinding is performed by two distinct means: washmills and ballmills.

=== Washmill ===
This represents the earliest rawmilling technology, and was used to grind soft materials such as chalk and clay. It is rather similar to a food processor. It consists of a large bowl (up to 15 m in diameter) into which the crushed (to less than 250 mm) raw materials are tipped along with a stream of water. The material is stirred by rotating sets of harrows. The outside walls of the bowl consist of gratings or perforated plates through which fine product can pass. Grinding is largely autogenous (i.e. it takes place by collision between lumps of raw material), and is very efficient, producing little waste heat, provided that the materials are soft. Typically two or three washmills are connected in series, these being provided with successively smaller outlet perforations. The entire system can produce slurry with the expenditure of as little as 5 kW·h of electricity per dry tonne. Relatively hard minerals (such as flint) in the mix, are more or less untouched by the grinding process, and settle out in the base of the mill, from where they are periodically dug out.

=== Ballmills and washdrums ===
The ballmill allows grinding of the harder limestones that are more common than chalk. A ballmill consists of a horizontal cylinder that rotates on its axis. It holds spherical, cylindrical or rod-like grinding media of size 15–100 mm that may be steel or a variety of ceramic materials, and occupy 20–30% of the mill volume. The shell of the mill is lined with steel or rubber plates. Grinding is effected by impact and attrition between the grinding media. The various mineral components of the rawmix are fed to the mill at a constant rate along with water, and the slurry runs from the outlet end. The washdrum has a similar concept, but contains little or no grinding media, grinding being autogenous, by the cascading action of the larger raw material pieces. It is suitable for soft materials, and particularly for flinty chalk, where the unground flint acts as grinding media.

=== Slurry fineness and moisture content ===
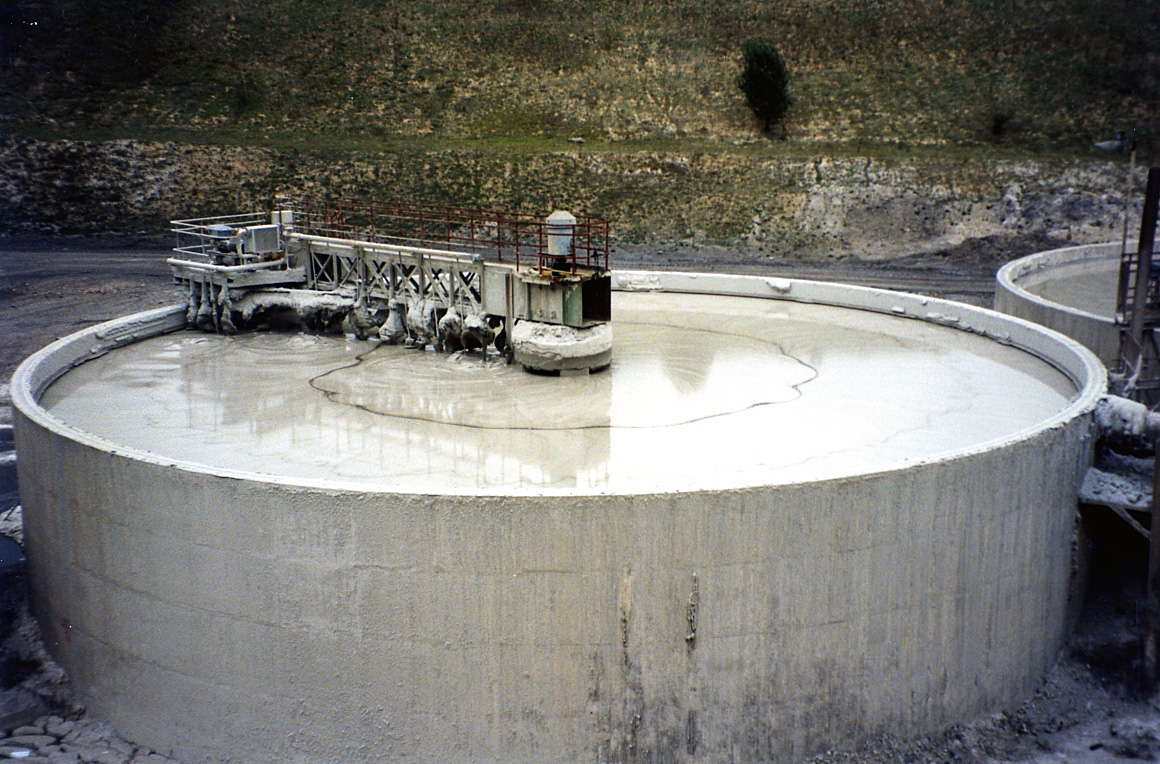
A 1500 m³ storage tank of slurry, blended and prevented from settling out by a rotating arm injecting compressed air

It is essential that large particles (> 150 μm for calcium carbonate and > 45 μm for quartz) should be eliminated from the rawmix, to facilitate chemical combination in the kiln. In the case of slurries, larger particles can be removed by hydrocyclones or sieving devices. These require a certain amount of energy, supplied by high pressure pumping. This process, and the moving and blending of the slurry, require careful control of the slurry viscosity. Clearly, a thinner slurry is easily obtained by adding more water, but at the expense of high energy consumption for its subsequent removal. In practice, the slurry is therefore made as thick as the plant equipment can handle. Cement rawmix slurries are Bingham plastics which can also exhibit thixotropic or rheopectic behaviour. The energy needed to pump slurry at a desired rate is controlled mainly by the slurry's yield stress, and this in turn varies more or less exponentially with the slurry solids/liquid ratio. In practice, deflocculants are often added in order to maintain pumpability at low moisture contents. Common deflocculants used (at typical dose rates of 0.005–0.03%) are sodium carbonate, sodium silicate, sodium polyphosphates and lignosulfonates. Under favourable circumstances, pumpable slurries with less than 25% water can be obtained.

Rawmixes frequently contain minerals of contrasting hardness, such as calcite and quartz. Simultaneous grinding of these in a rawmill is inefficient, because the grinding energy is preferentially used in grinding the softer material. This results in a large amount of excessively fine soft material, which "cushions" the grinding of the harder mineral. For this reason, sand is sometimes ground separately, then fed to the main rawmill as a fine slurry.

== Dry rawmills ==
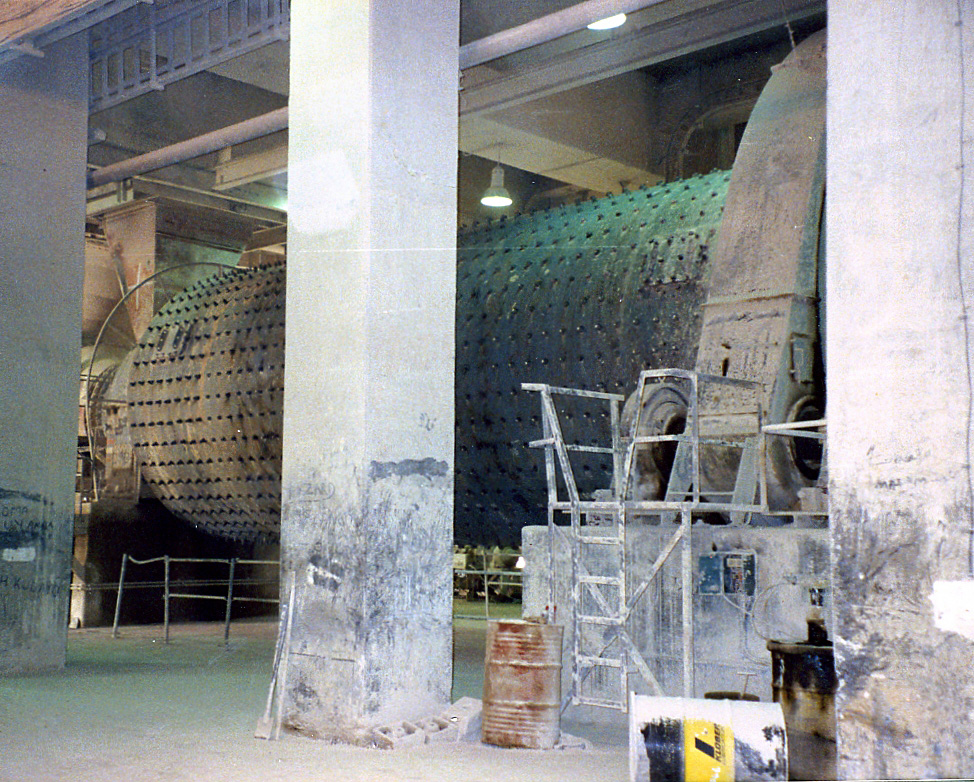
A dry process air-swept ball mill

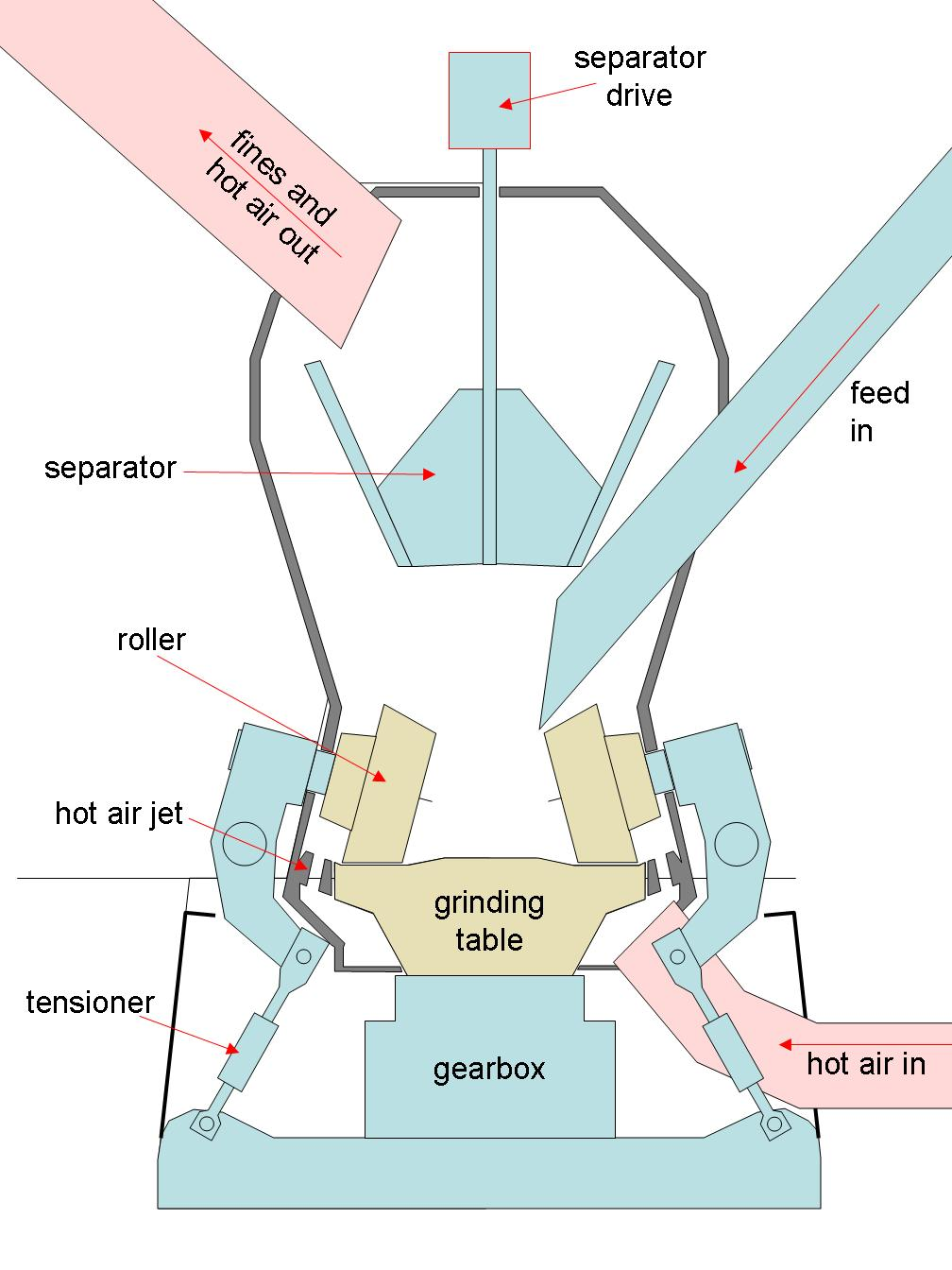
Typical roller mill layout

Dry rawmills are the normal technology installed today, allowing minimization of energy consumption and CO_{2} emissions. In general, cement raw materials are mainly quarried, and so contain a certain amount of natural moisture. Attempting to grind a wet material is unsuccessful because an intractable "mud" forms. On the other hand, it is much easier to dry a fine material than a coarse one, because large particles hold moisture deep in their structure. It is therefore usual to simultaneously dry and grind the materials in the rawmill. A hot-air furnace may be used to supply this heat, but usually hot waste gases from the kiln are used. For this reason, the rawmill is usually placed close to the kiln preheater. Types of dry rawmill include ball mills, roller mills and hammer mills.

=== Ball mills ===
These are similar to cement mills, but often with a larger gas flow. The gas temperature is controlled by cold-air bleeds to ensure a dry product without overheating the mill. The product passes into an air separator, which returns oversized particles to the mill inlet. Occasionally, the mill is preceded by a hot-air-swept hammer mill which does most of the drying and produces millimetre-sized feed for the mill. Ball mills are rather inefficient, and typically require 10–20 kW·h of electric power to make a tonne of rawmix. The Aerofall mill is sometimes used for pre-grinding large wet feeds. It is a short, large-diameter semi-autogenous mill, typically containing 15% by volume of very large (130 mm) grinding balls. Feed can be up to 250 mm, and the larger chunks produce much of the grinding action. The mill is air-swept, and the fines are carried away in the gas stream. Crushing and drying are efficient, but the product is coarse (around 100 μm), and is usually re-ground in a separate ball mill.

=== Roller mills ===
These are the standard form in modern installations, occasionally called vertical spindle mills. In a typical arrangement, the material is fed onto a rotating table, onto which steel rollers press down. A high velocity of hot gas flow is maintained close to the dish so that fine particles are swept away as soon as they are produced. The gas flow carries the fines into an integral air separator, which returns larger particles to the grinding path. The fine material is swept out in the exhaust gas and is captured by a cyclone before being pumped to storage. The remaining dusty gas is usually returned to the main kiln dust control equipment for cleaning. Feed size can be up to 100 mm. Roller mills are efficient, using about half the energy of a ball mill, and there seems to be no limit to the size available. Roller mills with output in excess of 800 tonnes per hour have been installed. Unlike ball mills, feed to the mill must be regular and uninterrupted; otherwise damaging resonant vibration sets in.

=== Hammer mills ===
Hammer mills (or "crusher driers") swept with hot kiln exhaust gases have limited application where a soft, wet raw material is being ground. The simple design means that it can be operated at a higher temperature than other mills, giving it high drying capacity. However, the grinding action is poor, and the product is often re-ground in a ball mill.
