= Cement mill =

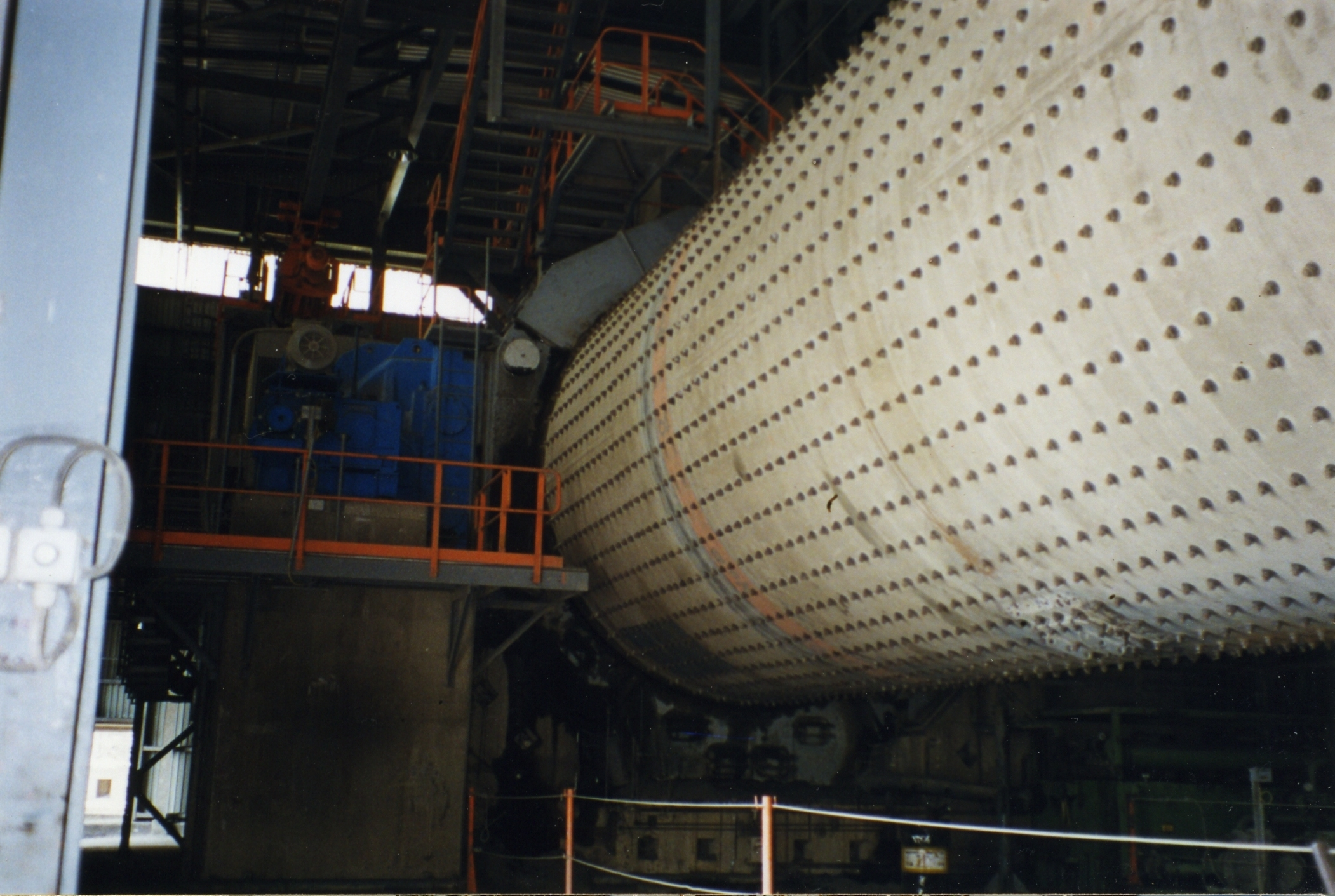
A 10 MW cement mill, output 270 tonnes per hour

A cement mill (or finish mill in North American usage) is the equipment used to grind the hard, nodular clinker from the cement kiln into the fine grey powder that is cement. Most cement is currently ground in ball mills and also vertical roller mills which are more effective than ball mills.

== History ==
Early hydraulic cements, such as those of James Parker, James Frost and Joseph Aspdin were relatively soft and readily ground by the primitive technology of the day, using flat millstones. The emergence of Portland cement in the 1840s made grinding considerably more difficult, because the clinker produced by the kiln is often as hard as the millstone material. Because of this, cement continued to be ground very coarsely (typically 20% over 100 μm particle diameter) until better grinding technology became available. Besides producing un-reactive cement with slow strength growth, this exacerbated the problem of unsoundness. This late, disruptive expansion is caused by hydration of large particles of calcium oxide. Fine grinding lessens this effect, and early cements had to be stored for several months to give the calcium oxide time to hydrate before it was fit for sale. From 1885 onward, the development of specialized steel led to the development of new forms of grinding equipment, and from this point onward, the typical fineness of cement began a steady rise. The progressive reduction in the proportion of larger, un-reactive cement particles has been partially responsible for the fourfold increase in the strength of Portland cement during the twentieth century. The recent history of the technology has been mainly concerned with reducing the energy consumption of the grinding process.

== Materials ground ==
Portland clinker is the main constituent of most cements. In Portland cement, a little calcium sulfate (typically 3-10%) is added in order to retard the hydration of tricalcium aluminate. The calcium sulfate may consist of natural gypsum, anhydrite, or synthetic wastes such as flue-gas desulfurization gypsum. In addition, up to 5% calcium carbonate and up to 1% of other minerals may be added. It is normal to add a certain amount of water, and small quantities of organic grinding aids and performance enhancers. "Blended cements" and Masonry cements may include large additions (up to 40%) of natural pozzolans, fly ash, limestone, silica fume or metakaolin. Blastfurnace slag cement may include up to 70% ground granulated blast furnace slag. See cement. Gypsum and calcium carbonate are relatively soft minerals, and rapidly grind to ultra-fine particles. Grinding aids are typically chemicals added at a rate of 0.01-0.03% that coat the newly formed surfaces of broken mineral particles and prevent re-agglomeration. They include 1,2-propanediol, acetic acid, triethanolamine and lignosulfonates.

== Temperature control ==
Heat generated in the grinding process causes gypsum (CaSO_{4}.2H_{2}O) to lose water, forming bassanite (CaSO_{4}.0.2-0.7H_{2}O) or γ-anhydrite (CaSO_{4}.~0.05H_{2}O). The latter minerals are rapidly soluble, and about 2% of these in cement is needed to control tricalcium aluminate hydration. If more than this amount forms, crystallization of gypsum on their re-hydration causes "false set" - a sudden thickening of the cement mix a few minutes after mixing, which thins out on re-mixing. High milling temperature causes this. On the other hand, if milling temperature is too low, insufficient rapidly soluble sulfate is available and this causes "flash set" - an irreversible stiffening of the mix. Obtaining the optimum amount of rapidly soluble sulfate requires milling with a mill exit temperature within a few degrees of 115 °C. Where the milling system is too hot, some manufacturers use 2.5% gypsum and the remaining calcium sulfate as natural α-anhydrite (CaSO_{4}). Complete dehydration of this mixture yields the optimum 2% γ-anhydrite. In the case of some efficient modern mills, insufficient heat is generated. This is corrected by recirculating part of the hot exhaust air to the mill inlet.

== Ball Mills ==
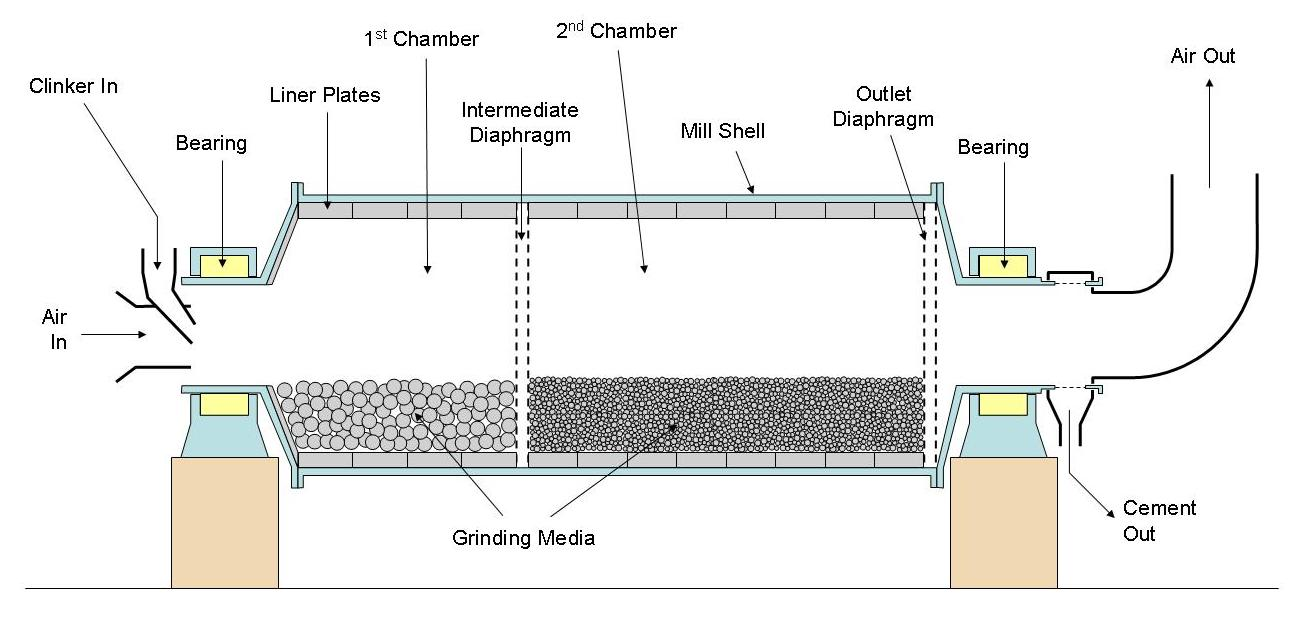
Ball Mill Layout

A Ball mill is a horizontal cylinder partly filled with steel balls (or occasionally other shapes) that rotates on its axis, imparting a tumbling and cascading action to the balls. Material fed through the mill is crushed by impact and ground by attrition between the balls. The grinding media are usually made of high-chromium steel. The smaller grades are occasionally cylindrical ("pebs") rather than spherical. There exists a speed of rotation (the "critical speed") at which the contents of the mill would simply ride over the roof of the mill due to centrifugal action. The critical speed (rpm) is given by: n_{C} = 42.29/√d, where d is the internal diameter in metres. Ball mills are normally operated at around 75% of critical speed, so a mill with diameter 5 metres will turn at around 14 rpm.

The mill is usually divided into at least two chambers (although this depends upon feed input size - mills including a roller press are mostly single-chambered), allowing the use of different sizes of grinding media. Large balls are used at the inlet, to crush clinker nodules (which can be over 25 mm in diameter). Ball diameter here is in the range 60–80 mm. In a two-chamber mill, the media in the second chamber are typically in the range 15–40 mm, although media down to 5 mm are sometimes encountered. As a general rule, the size of media has to match the size of material being ground: large media can't produce the ultra-fine particles required in the finished cement, but small media can't break large clinker particles. Mills with as many as four chambers, allowing a tight segregation of media sizes, were once used, but this is now becoming rare. Alternatives to multi-chamber mills are:

- pairs of mills, run in tandem, charged with different-sized media.
- use of alternative technology (see Roll-presses below) to crush the clinker prior to fine-grinding in a ball mill.

A current of air is passed through the mill. This helps keep the mill cool, and sweeps out evaporated moisture which would otherwise cause hydration and disrupt material flow. The dusty exhaust air is cleaned, usually with bag filters.

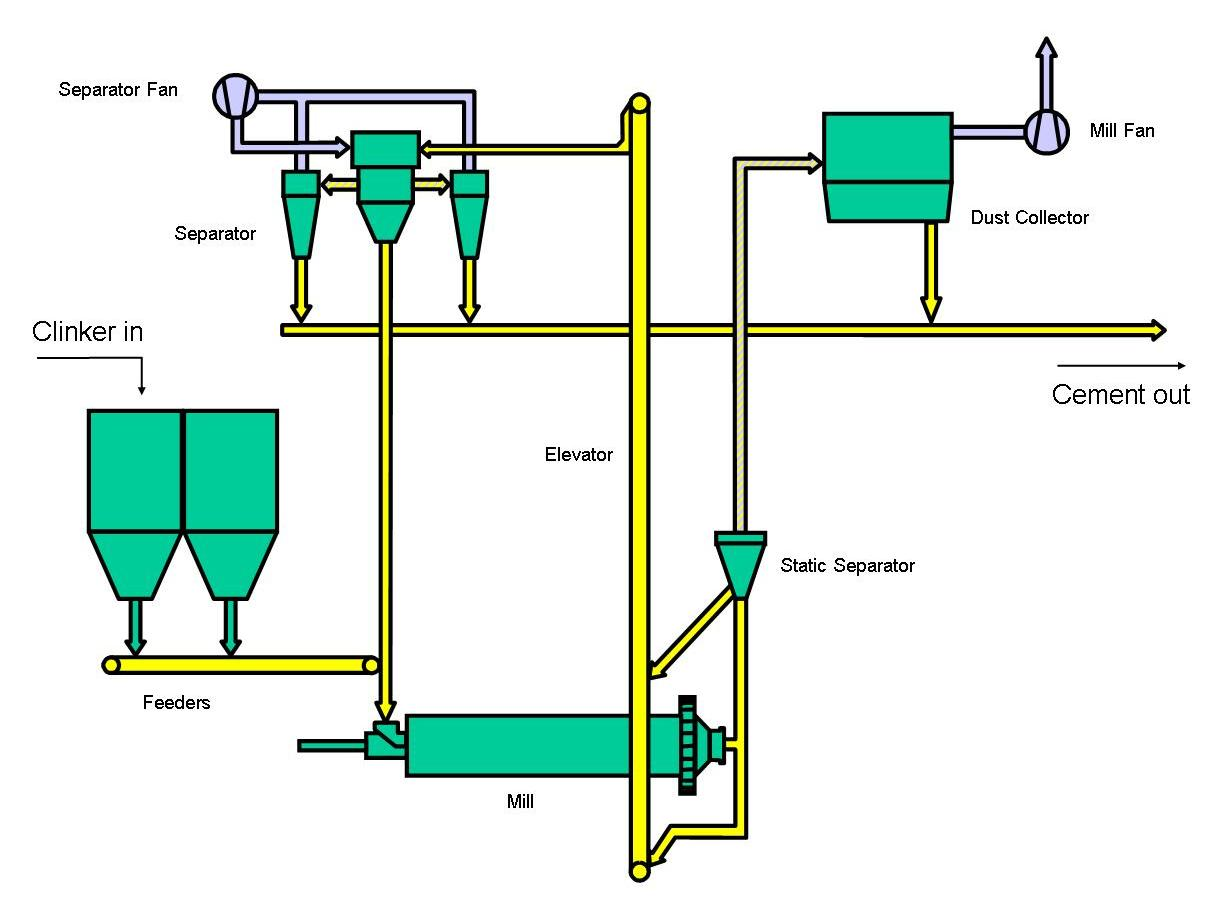
Typical mill/separator circuit

=== Closed-circuit systems ===
The efficiency of the early stages of grinding in a ball mill is much greater than that for formation of ultra-fine particles, so ball mills operate most efficiently by making a coarse product, the fine fractions of this then being separated, and the coarse part being returned to the mill inlet. The proportion of the mill-exit material returned to the inlet may vary from 10 to 30% when ordinary cement is being ground, to 85-95% for extremely fine cement products. It is important for system efficiency that the minimum amount of material of finished-product fineness is returned to the inlet. Modern separators are capable of making a very precise size "cut" and contribute significantly to the reduction of energy consumption, and have the additional advantage that they cool both the product and the returned material, thus minimizing overheating.

Efficient closed-circuit systems, because of their tight particle size control, lead to cements with relatively narrow particle size distributions (i.e. for a given mean particle size, they have fewer large and small particles). This is of advantage in that it maximizes the strength-production potential the clinker, because large particles are inert. As a rule of thumb, only the outer 7 μm "skin" of each particle hydrates in concrete, so any particle over 14 μm diameter always leaves an un-reacted core. However, the lack of ultra-fine particles can be a disadvantage. These particles normally pack the spaces between the larger particles in a cement paste, and if absent the deficit is made up with extra water, leading to lower strength. This can be remedied by including 5% calcium carbonate in the cement: this soft mineral produces adequate ultra-fines on the first pass through the mill.

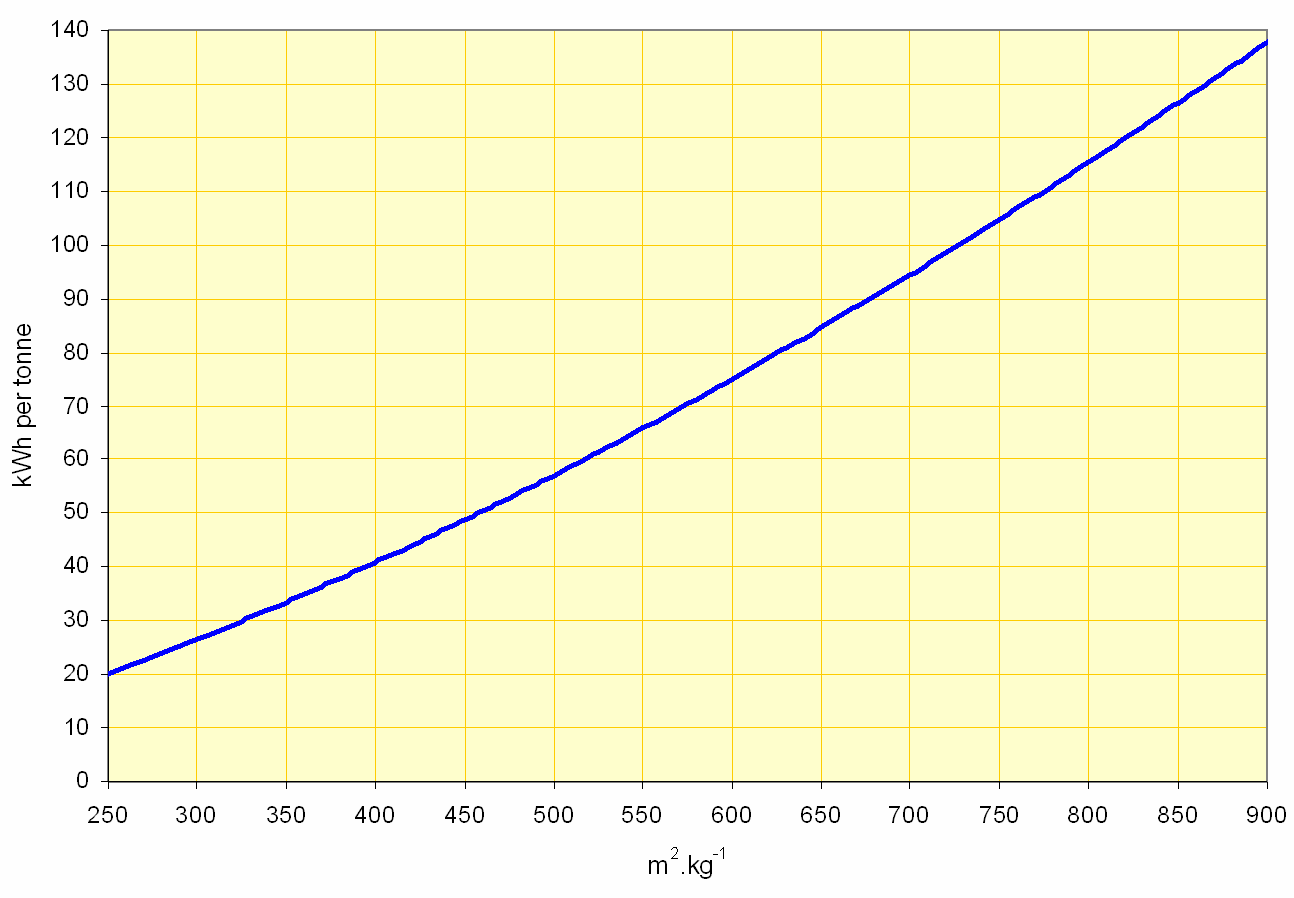
Typical mill power consumption for various degrees of fineness. Actual values vary according to mill system efficiency and clinker hardness.

=== Energy consumption and output ===
Approximately 65% of the total power for the production of cement is consumed in grinding.

=== Clinker hardness ===
The hardness of clinker is important for the energy cost of the grinding process. It depends both on the clinker's mineral composition and its thermal history. The easiest-ground clinker mineral is alite, so high-alite clinkers reduce grinding costs, although they are more expensive to make in the kiln. The toughest mineral is belite, because it is harder, and is somewhat plastic, so that crystals tend to flatten rather than shatter when impacted in the mill. The mode of burning of the clinker is also important. Clinker rapidly burned at the minimum temperature for combination, then rapidly cooled, contains small, defective crystals that grind easily. These crystals are usually also optimal for reactivity. On the other hand, long burning at excess temperature, and slow cooling, lead to large, well-formed crystals that are hard to grind and un-reactive. The effect of such a clinker can be to double milling costs.

== Roller mills ==
These have been used for many years for the less exacting raw-milling process, but recently roller mills, in combination with high-efficiency separators, have been used for cement grinding. The grinding action employs much greater stress on the material than in a ball mill, and is therefore more efficient. Energy consumption is typically half that of a ball mill. However, the narrowness of the particle size distribution of the cement is problematic, and the process has yet to receive wide acceptance.

== High-pressure roll presses ==
These consist of a pair of rollers set 8–30 mm apart and counter-rotating with surface speed around 0.9 - 1.8 m·s^{−1}. The bearings of the rollers are designed to deliver a pressure of 50 MPa or more. The bed of material drawn between the rollers emerges as a slab-like agglomeration of highly fractured particles. The energy efficiency of this process is comparatively high. Systems have been designed, including a de-agglomerator and separator, that will deliver material of cement fineness. However, particle size distribution is again a problem, and roll presses are now increasingly popular as a "pre-grind" process, with the cement finished in a single chamber ball mill. This gives good cement performance, and reduces energy consumption by 20-40% compared with a standard ball mill system.

== Capacity of cement mills ==
The cement mills on a cement plant are usually sized for a clinker consumption considerably greater than the output of the plant's kilns. This is for two reasons:

- The mills are sized to cope with peaks in market demand for cement. In temperate countries, the summer demand for cement is usually much higher than that in winter. Excess clinker produced in winter goes into storage in readiness for summer demand peaks. For this reason, plants with highly seasonal demand usually have very large clinker stores.
- Cement milling is the largest user of electric power on a cement plant, and because they can easily be started and stopped, it often pays to operate cement mills only during "off-peak" periods when cheaper power is available. This is also favourable for electricity producers, who can negotiate power prices with major users in order to balance their generating capacity over 24 hours. More sophisticated arrangements such as "power shedding" are often employed. This consists of the cement manufacturer shutting down the plant at short notice when the power supplier expects a critical demand peak, in return for favourable prices. Clearly, plenty of excess cement milling capacity is needed in order to "catch up" after such interruptions.

== Control of product quality ==
In addition to control of temperature (mentioned above), the main requirement is to obtain a consistent fineness of the product. From the earliest times, fineness was measured by sieving the cement. As cements have become finer, the use of sieves is less applicable, but the amount retained on a 45 μm sieve is still measured, usually by air-jet sieving or wet-sieving. The amount passing this sieve (typically 95% in modern general-purpose cements) is related to the overall strength-development potential of the cement, because the larger particles are essentially unreactive.

The main measure of fineness today is specific surface. Because cement particles react with water at their surface, the specific surface area is directly related to the cement's initial reactivity. By adjusting the fineness of grind, the manufacture can produce a range of products from a single clinker. Tight control of fineness is necessary in order to obtain cement with the desired consistent day-to-day performance, so round-the-clock measurements are made on the cement as it is produced, and mill feed-rates and separator settings are adjusted to maintain constant specific surface.

A more comprehensive picture of fineness is given by particle size analysis, yielding a measure of the amount of each size range present, from sub-micrometer upwards. This used to be mainly a research tool, but with the advent of cheap, industrialized laser-diffraction analyzers, its use for routine control is becoming more frequent. This may take the form of a desk-top analyzer fed with automatically gathered samples in a robotized laboratory, or, increasingly commonly, instruments attached directly to the output ducts of the mill. In either case, the results can be fed directly into the mill control system, allowing complete automation of fineness control.

In addition to fineness, added materials in the cement must be controlled. In the case of gypsum addition, the material used is frequently of variable quality, and it is normal practise to measure the sulfate content of the cement regularly, typically by x-ray fluorescence, using the results to adjust the gypsum feed rate. Again, this process is often completely automated. Similar measurement and control protocols are applied to other materials added, such as limestone, slag and fly-ash.
