= Charles Pasley =

British soldier and military engineer (1780–1861)

General Sir Charles Pasley KCB FRS
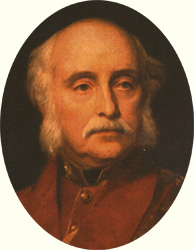
- Birth name: Charles William Pasley
- Born: 8 September 1780 Eskdale Muir, Dumfriesshire, Scotland
- Died: 19 April 1861 (aged 80)

General Sir Charles William Pasley KCB FRS (8 September 1780 – 19 April 1861) was a British soldier and military engineer who wrote the defining text on the role of the post-American Revolution British Empire: An Essay on the Military Policy and Institutions of the British Empire, published in 1810. This text changed how Britons thought their empire should relate to the rest of the world. He warned that Britain could not keep its Empire by its "splendid isolation". Britain would need to fight to gain its empire, and by using the colonies as a resource for soldiers and sailors it grew by an average of 100,000 square miles (260,000 km^{2}) per year between the Battle of Waterloo and the American Civil War. Serving in the Royal Engineers in the Napoleonic Wars, he was Europe's leading demolitions expert and siege warfare specialist.

== Life ==
Pasley was born at Eskdale Muir, Dumfriesshire, on 8 September 1780. He was highly intelligent, capable of translating the New Testament from Greek at the age of eight. In 1796, he entered the Royal Military Academy at Woolwich; a year later he gained his commission in the Royal Artillery, and he was transferred to the Royal Engineers in 1798.

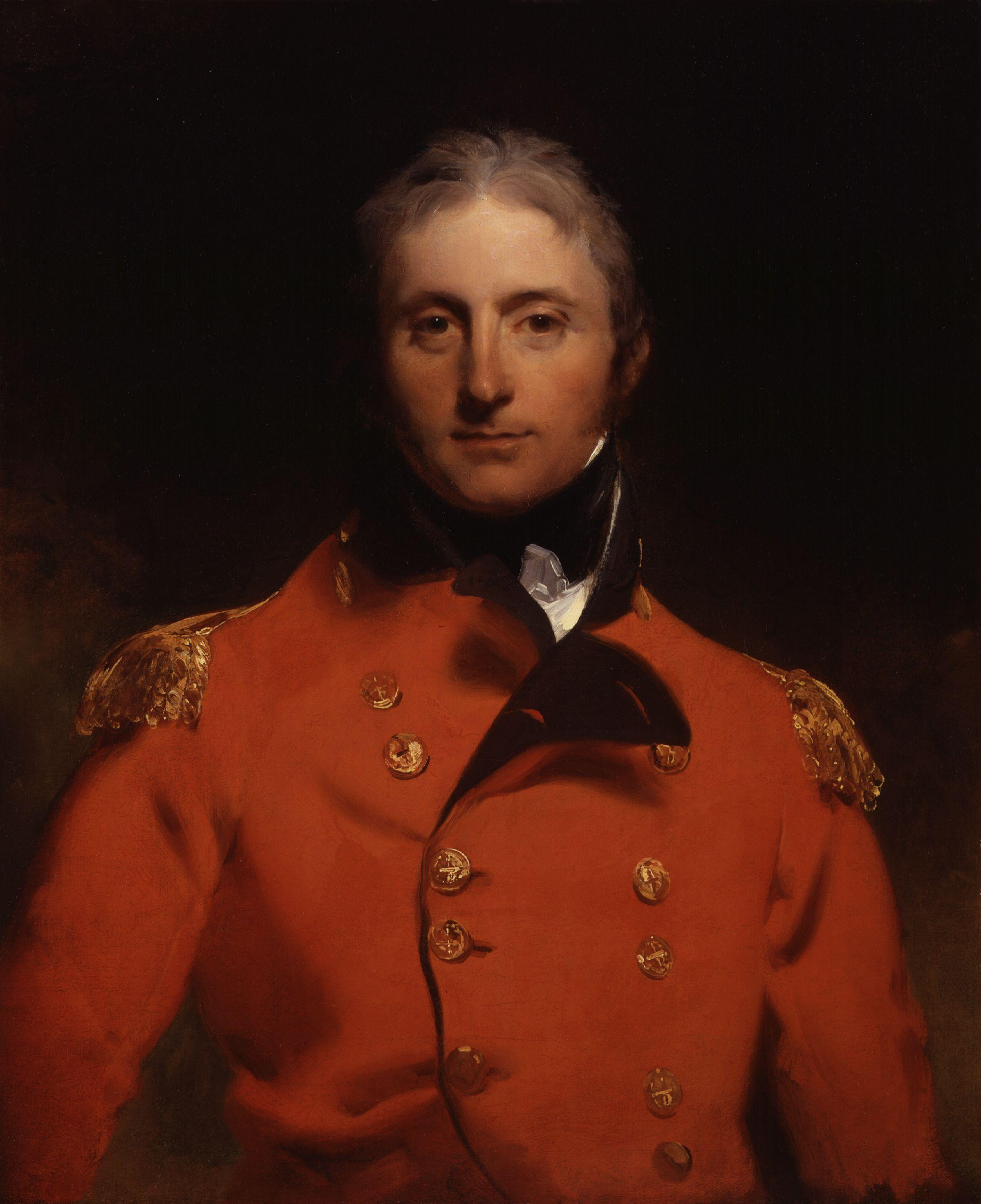
Portrait of Sir John Moore by Thomas Lawrence.

He was present in the defence of Gaeta, the Battle of Maida, and the siege of Copenhagen. In 1807, then a captain, he went to the Iberian Peninsula, where his knowledge of the Spanish language led to his employment on the staff of Sir David Baird and Sir John Moore. He took part in the retreat to Corunna and the Walcheren Expedition, and received a severe wound while gallantly leading a storming party at Flushing. During his tedious recovery, he employed himself in learning German.

After discontinuing service, he devoted the rest of his life to the foundation of a complete military engineering science and to the thorough organization and training of the corps of Royal Engineers. Though only a captain, his great success led him to act as the commanding royal engineer at Plymouth for two years and was given a special grant. Because the events of the Peninsular War emphasized the need for a fully trained engineer corps, the War Office adopted Pasley's views. He was placed at the head of the new School of Military Engineering at Woolwich in 1812. In 1816 he was elected a Fellow of the Royal Society.

Pasley developed a new form of pontoon bridge which was adopted in 1817 by the British Army. Each pontoon was split into two-halves and you could connect two pointed ends together in cases where you had tidal flow. Each half was enclosed, so reducing the risk of swamping and there were multiple lashing points. The "Pasley Pontoon" lasted until it was replaced in 1836.

Concurrently, Pasley was gazetted brevet major. He became brevet lieutenant-colonel in 1813 and substantive lieutenant-colonel in 1814. The first volume of his Military Instruction appeared in 1814 and contained a course of practical geometry which he had framed for his company at Plymouth. Two other volumes completing the work appeared by 1817 and dealt with the science and practice of fortification, the latter comprising rules for construction. He published a work on Practical Architecture and prepared an important treatise on The Practical Operations of a Siege (1829–1832), which was translated into French (1847).

He became brevet colonel in 1830 and substantive colonel in 1831. From 1831 to 1834, he focused his attention on the standardization of coins, weights and measures, publishing a book on the topic in 1834. In 1838, he was presented with the freedom of the city of London for his services in removing sunken vessels from the bed of the Thames near Gravesend. From 1839 to 1844, he was occupied with clearing away the wrecks of HMS Royal George from Spithead and HMS Edgar from St. Helens. All this work was subsidiary to his great work of creating a comprehensive art of military engineering.

== Railway Inspectorate ==
On 23 November 1841, on promotion to the rank of major-general, he was made an inspector-general of railways, replacing Lieutenant-Colonel Sir Frederic Smith. During this period of intense activity on the new railway network, he inspected many new lines, criticising the haste in which some were opened to poor engineering standards. However, he came under criticism for his approval of the North British Railway's line from Edinburgh to Berwick in June 1846; the bridges and earthworks failed to withstand heavy rain in September 1846 and nineteen miles of track were rendered unusable. Temporary works were undertaken to restore a service, Pasley approved them (orally), but some of the new work then proved faulty.

In November 1846, the inspectorate was reorganised, with no post for Pasley in the new structure: on vacating this appointment, he was made a K.C.B., and thenceforward was chiefly concerned with the East India Company's military seminary at Addiscombe. He was promoted lieutenant-general in 1851, made colonel commandant of the Royal Engineers in 1853, and general in 1860. He died in London on 19 April 1861. His eldest son, Major-General Charles Pasley (1824–1890), was a distinguished Royal Engineer officer. His daughter Margaret married railway inspector and MP Henry Whatley Tyler. Another son, George Malcolm Pasley (d.1861), served as an officer in the Royal Artillery (South Africa 1849-51 and Indian Mutiny) and as ADC to General Michel in the Turkish Contingent in the Crimean War.

In 1826, as lecturer in architecture and engineering at the Royal School of Military Engineering at Chatham, he began research and experiments on artificial hydraulic cement, attempting to match or make an improvement over natural or "Roman" cement, invented by James Parker in 1796. In 1830, he succeeded and with chalk and Medway clay, produced a hydraulic lime equal to the natural "Roman" cement and similar to that produced by Joseph Aspdin in Wakefield.

== Works ==
Among Pasley's works, besides the aforementioned, were separate editions of his Practical Geometry Method (1822) and of his Course of Elementary Fortification (1822), both of which formed part of his Military Instruction; Rules for Escalading Fortifications not having Palisaded Covered Ways (1822; new eds. 1845 and 1854); descriptions of a semaphore invented by himself in 1804 (1822 and 1823); A Simple Practical Treatise on Field Fortification (1823); and Exercise of the Newdecked Pontoons invented by Lieutenant-Colonel Pasley (1823).

=== Links to works ===
- Essay on the Military Policy and institutions of the British Empire by Charles Pasley (2nd ed., 1811): Part I

== See also ==
- Dee bridge disaster
- Penmanshiel Tunnel
- Railway Inspectorate
