= Isaac Charles Johnson =

Isaac Charles Johnson (28 January 1811 – 29 November 1911) was a British cement manufacturer, and a pioneer of the Portland cement industry.

Born in London, his father was a charge-hand at Francis & White's "Roman Cement" plant in Nine Elms. He himself worked there as a labourer from age 16 while studying chemistry. In 1833 he became manager of John Bazeley White's cement plant at Swanscombe on the Thames Estuary which at that time was producing "Artificial Cement" and "Roman Cement". Joseph Aspdin's product was successful but very expensive, and was later improved independently by his son William. Johnson set to work trying to discover its composition but because Aspdin's product was protected by explicit patents and extreme secrecy it was impossible to market a copy. After nearly two years' work, he succeeded and started marketing his own considerably improved version.

Johnson, a highly moral man, Mayor of Gateshead and a JP, was able to claim that he was the inventor of "true" Portland cement and is generally recognised as such. Aspdin, however, was driven out of business by financial problems caused by the success of Johnson's superior and cheaper product and this led to Johnson taking over Aspdins Cement works at Gateshead, County Durham. Unfortunately this resulted in an embittered Aspdin making wild and vitriolic charges of how his product had been copied. Johnson left J.B. White's shortly afterwards, and, setting up his own company, established a succession of cement plants at Frindsbury, Cliffe and Greenhithe in Kent, and acquired William Aspdin's plant at Gateshead. He pioneered several innovations, including the production of low-water rawmix slurries, and new designs for kilns and industrial chimneys. His company remained a relatively large and successful player in the British cement industry for the next 60 years. The Greenhithe plant was uprated with rotary kilns in 1901. In 1911 I C Johnson & Co became a part of the Blue Circle Group, and his Greenhithe plant remained in operation until 1971. In 1910 on his 100th birthday Johnson was presented with a silver tea service by representatives of the cement industry in Britain and several European Countries.

In the course of his long life, Johnson also served as a borough magistrate for Gateshead, a county magistrate for Kent, and councillor for the Borough of Gravesend, in addition to serving on a number of commissions, services not untypical for a businessman of the period. He was also president of the Gravesend Liberal Association and the Gravesend Total Abstinence Society.

Johnson was a founding member of Zoar Strict and Particular Baptist Church, Gravesend, where he served as a deacon for many years. He was also an occasional preacher among the Strict Baptists.

Johnson wrote the Autobiography of Isaac Charles Johnson Esq, JP (published by Farncombe & Sons, London, 1912), which was published after his death.
