= William Aspdin =

English cement pioneer

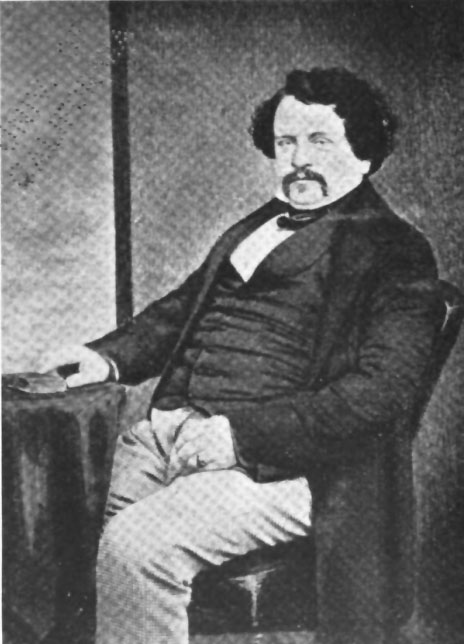
- Born: 23 September 1815; Leeds, England
- Died: 11 April 1864 (aged 48); Itzehoe, Holstein, Germany
- Father: Joseph Aspdin
- Scientific career
- Fields: British mason, bricklayer and inventor of modern Portland cement

William Aspdin (23 September 1815 – 11 April 1864) was an English cement manufacturer, and a pioneer of the Portland cement industry. He is considered the inventor of "modern" Portland cement. He has also been termed "an incorrigible liar and swindler".

Joseph Aspdin, his father, is proven to have patented the method of cement manufacture in 1824 which is how cement continues to be made to this day, albeit with technological advances.

== Biography ==
Aspdin was born in Leeds, the second son of Joseph Aspdin, an English cement manufacturer. In 1824, Joseph obtained a patent for Portland cement, a relatively fast-setting cement usable only in mortars and stuccos.

William joined his father's cement manufacturing firm in 1829, at the age of fourteen. In July 1841, Aspdin left the firm after a major disagreement with his father. Joseph then went into partnership with his elder son, James, posting a notice that Aspdin had left, and that the company would not be responsible for his debts, stating "I think it right to give notice that my late agent, William Aspdin, is not now in my employment, and that he is not authorised to receive any money, nor contract any debts on my behalf or on behalf of the new firm."

A marriage record from Royston Saint John the Baptist church in Barnsley of 28 December 1841 reports the marriage of William Aspdin and Jane Leadman of Barnsley. None of his family was present at the wedding.

In 1843, Aspdin set up a manufacturing plant at Rotherhithe, southeast London, where he was soon making a cement that caused a sensation among users in London. William had discovered that a significantly different product, with much wider applications, could be made by modifying his father's cement formulation. By increasing the limestone content in the mixture, and burning it much hotter, a slow-setting, high-strength product suitable for use in concrete could be obtained. This product was substantially more expensive to make, in terms of cost of extra limestone, cost of extra fuel, and difficult grinding of the hard clinker.

Although this product, referred to today as "modern" Portland cement, was entirely different mineralogically from that of his father, Aspdin did not take out a patent, or give it a new name. Instead he attempted to keep the details of his methods secret, sometimes claiming that the product was covered by his father's patent. Famously, he would emerge from his office when each newly loaded kiln was ready for firing, and scatter in handfuls of brightly coloured crystals over the raw mix, to give the impression that the special properties of his product were the result of an unidentified "magic ingredient". However, in 1845, his rival Isaac Charles Johnson succeeded in creating a similar product for J. B. White & Co.'s nearby Swanscombe plant.

Aspdin contracted several partnerships to finance his operations. As "Maude, Jones & Aspdin", he acquired the Parker and Wyatt plant at Northfleet Creek in Kent, and transferred his manufacturing operations there in 1846. He sold out his share of the Northfleet plant in 1852, and set up in Gateshead, County Durham, as "Aspdin, Ord & Co". In 1857, he sold out again, and moved to Germany. From 1860, he set up cement plants at Altona and Lagerdorf, these being the first plants to make modern Portland cement outside the UK. He died at Itzehoe near Hamburg on 11 April 1864.

The Northfleet plant continued making Portland cement on a small scale as Robins & Co. Ltd. until it was taken over by APCM (Blue Circle) in 1900. It shut down shortly afterwards. The Gateshead plant was bought by I. C. Johnson, and continued in operation until 1911, when it too was bought by Blue Circle and shut down.

Aspdin's finances were chaotic, to say the least, and he went bankrupt at least twice. At each relocation, he was pursued by angry creditors. His history of "financial missteps" and questionable business arrangements suggests that William may have been both inept and dishonest. Courland documents evidence of both forgery and embezzlement and does not hesitate to identify him as a con man. Aspdin made a number of claims which have since been shown to be false, including trading on his father's name, reputation, and patent. One of the most preposterous was William's claim that his father's cement was used by Marc Isambard Brunel in the creation of the Thames Tunnel in London.

Like his father, Aspdin had little chemical training, and his innovations were likely the result of luck. His contribution (although he was unaware of its chemical significance) was to make the first cement containing alite as an active ingredient. He is credited with launching the "modern" Portland cement industry.
