= Portland cement =

Binder used as basic ingredient of concrete

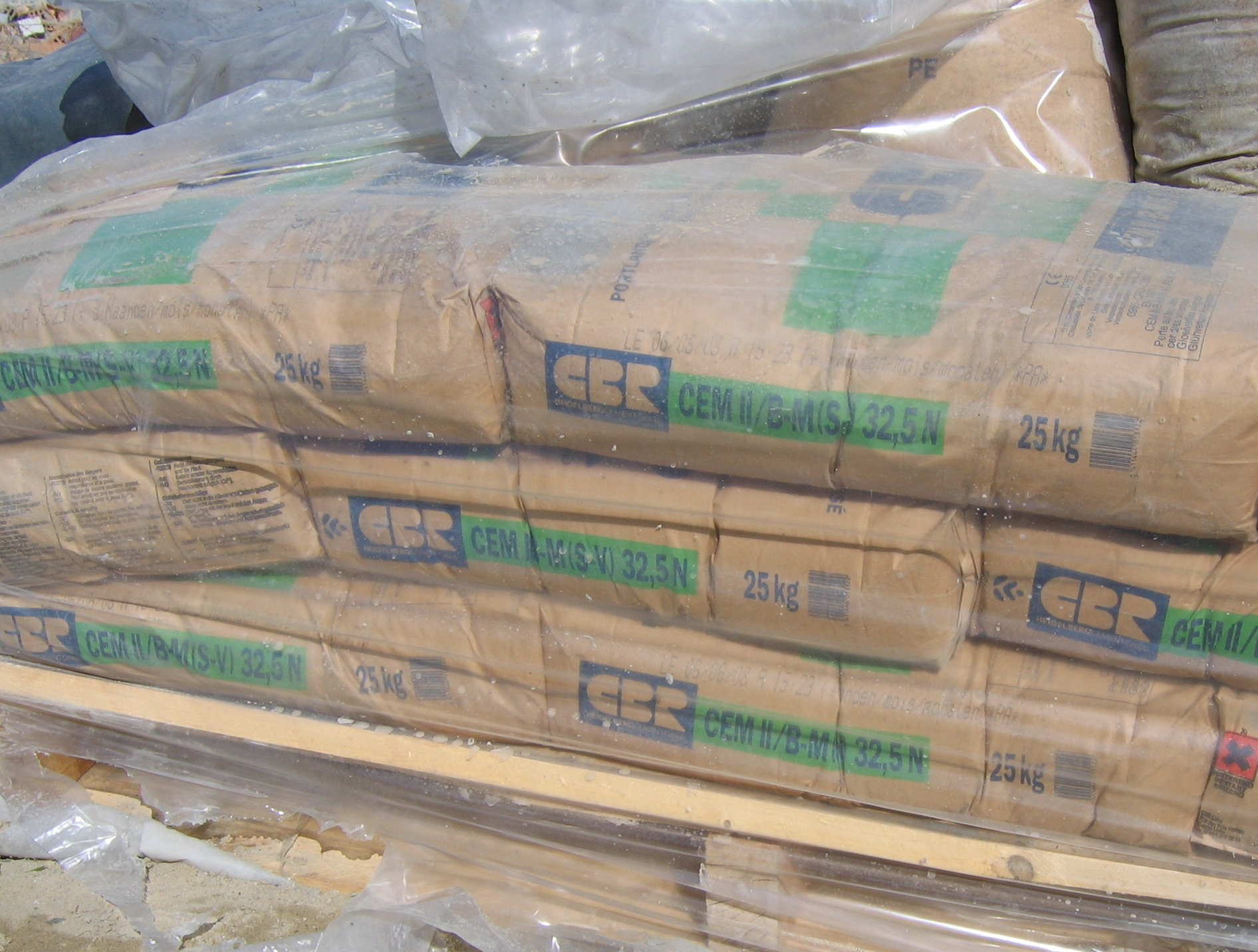
Bags of Portland cement wrapped and stacked on a pallet.

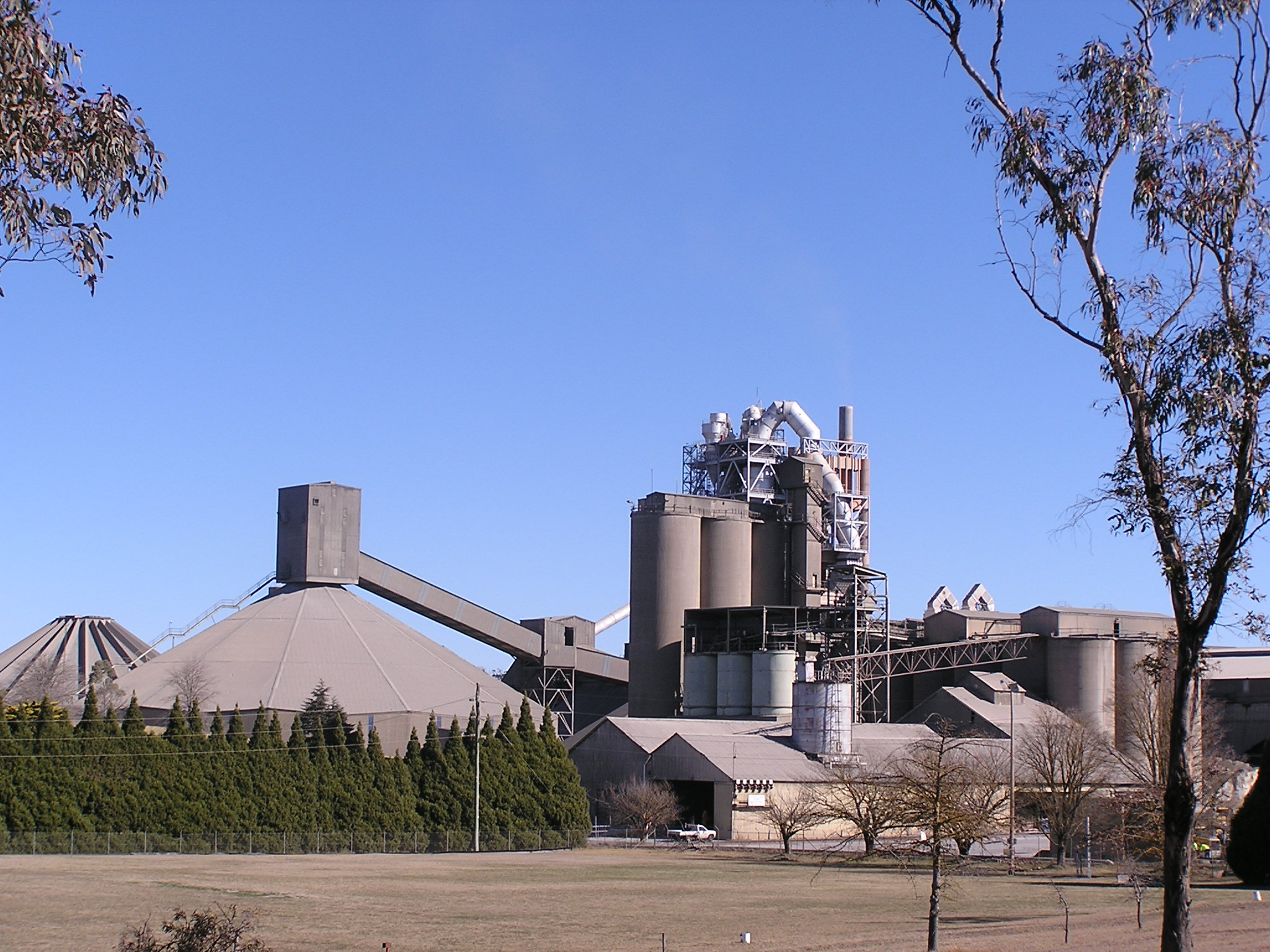
Blue Circle Southern Cement works near Berrima, New South Wales, Australia

Portland cement is the most common type of cement in general use around the world as a basic ingredient of concrete, mortar, stucco, and non-specialty grout. It was developed from other types of hydraulic lime in England in the early 19th century by Joseph Aspdin, and is usually made from limestone. It is a fine powder, produced by heating limestone and clay minerals in a kiln to form clinker, and then grinding the clinker with the addition of several percent (often around 5%) gypsum. Several types of Portland cement are available. The most common, historically called ordinary Portland cement (OPC), is grey, but white Portland cement is also available.

The cement was so named by Joseph Aspdin, who obtained a patent for it in 1824, because, once hardened, it resembled the fine, pale limestone known as Portland stone, quarried from the windswept cliffs of the Isle of Portland in Dorset. Portland stone was prized for centuries in British architecture and used in iconic structures such as St Paul's Cathedral and the British Museum.

His son William Aspdin is regarded as the inventor of "modern" Portland cement due to his developments in the 1840s.

The low cost and widespread availability of the limestone, shales, and other naturally occurring materials used in Portland cement make it a relatively cheap building material. At 4.4 billion tons manufactured (in 2023), Portland cement ranks third in the list (by mass) of manufactured materials, outranked only by sand and gravel. These three are combined, with water, to make the most manufactured material, concrete. This is Portland cement's most common use.

== History ==
Portland cement was developed from natural cements made in Britain beginning in the middle of the 18th century. Its name is derived from its similarity to Portland stone, a type of building stone quarried on the Isle of Portland in Dorset, England. The development of modern Portland cement (sometimes called ordinary or normal Portland cement) began in 1756, when John Smeaton experimented with combinations of different limestones and additives, including trass and pozzolanas, intended for the construction of a lighthouse, now known as Smeaton's Tower. In the late 18th century, Roman cement was developed and patented in 1796 by James Parker. Roman cement quickly became popular, but was largely replaced by Portland cement in the 1850s. In 1811, James Frost produced a cement he called British cement. James Frost is reported to have erected a manufactory for making of an artificial cement in 1826. In 1811 Edgar Dobbs of Southwark patented a cement of the kind invented 7 years later by the French engineer Louis Vicat. Vicat's cement is an artificial hydraulic lime, and is considered the "principal forerunner" of Portland cement.

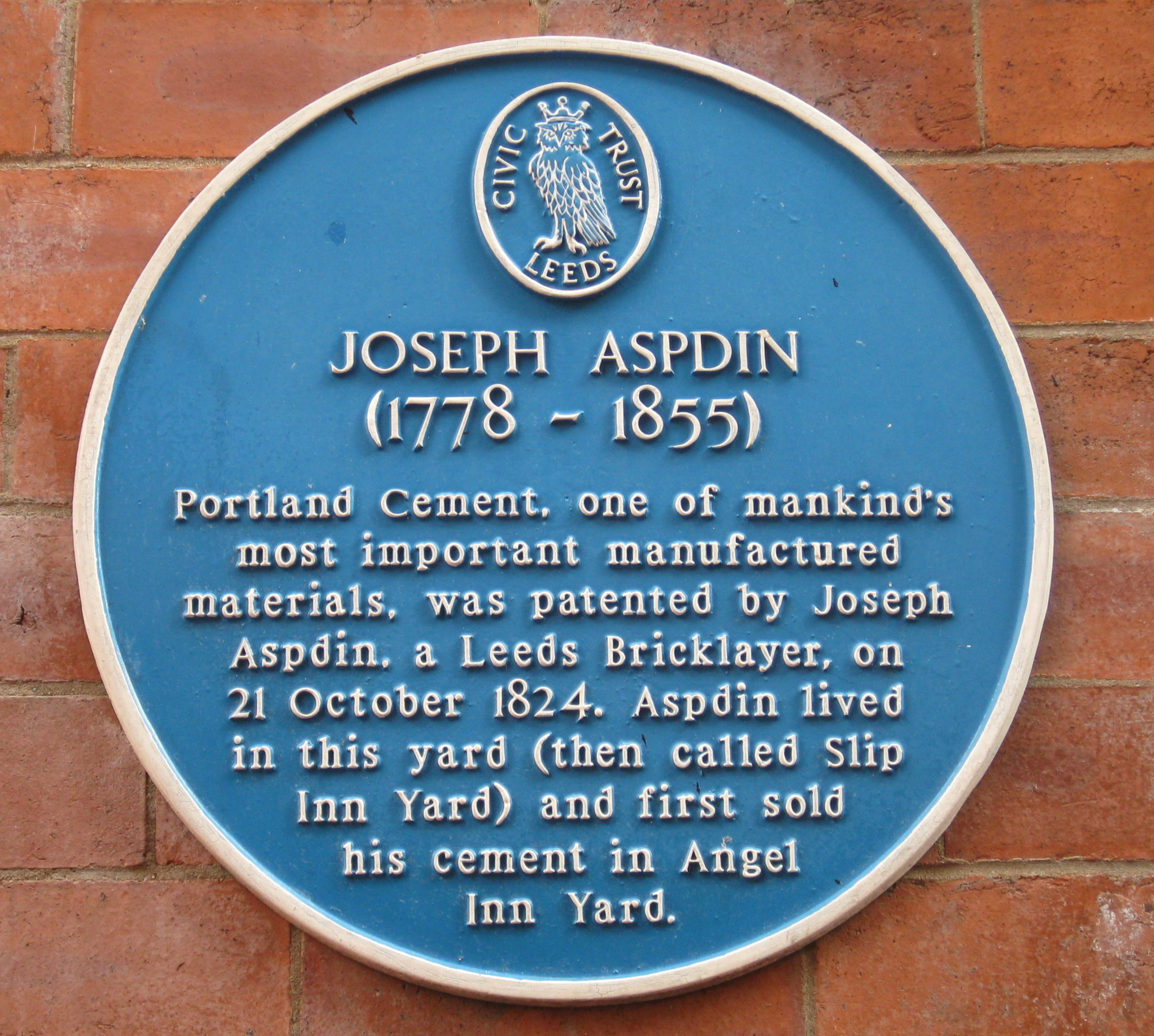
Plaque in Leeds, England commemorating Joseph Aspdin

The name Portland cement is recorded in a directory published in 1823 being associated with a William Lockwood and possibly others. In his 1824 cement patent, Joseph Aspdin called his invention "Portland cement" because of its resemblance to Portland stone. Aspdin's cement was nothing like modern Portland cement, but a first step in the development of modern Portland cement, and has been called a "proto-Portland cement".

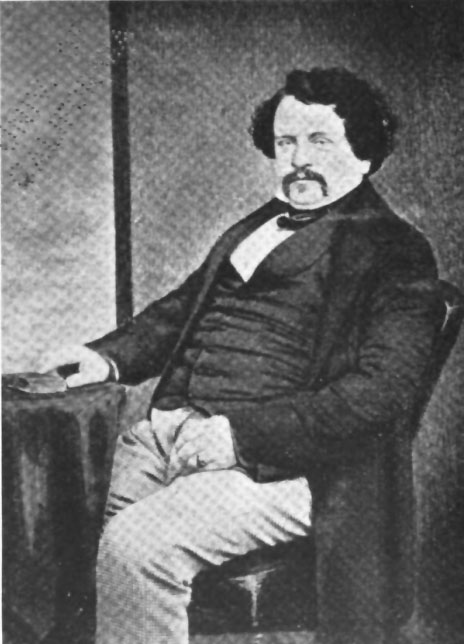
William Aspdin is considered the inventor of "modern" Portland cement.

William Aspdin had left his father's company, to form his own cement manufactury. In the 1840s William, apparently accidentally, produced calcium silicates which are a middle step in the development of Portland cement. In 1843, he set up a manufacturing plant at Rotherhithe, southeast London, where he was soon making a cement that caused a sensation among users in London. In 1848, William further improved his cement. Then, in 1853, he moved to Germany, where he was involved in cement making. William made what could be called "meso-Portland cement" (a mix of Portland cement and hydraulic lime). Isaac Charles Johnson further refined the production of "meso-Portland cement" (middle stage of development), and claimed to be the real father of Portland cement.

In 1859, John Grant of the Metropolitan Board of Works, set out requirements for cement to be used in the London sewer project. This became a specification for Portland cement. The next development in the manufacture of Portland cement was the introduction of the rotary kiln, patented by Frederick Ransome in 1885 (U.K.) and 1886 (U.S.); which allowed a stronger, more homogeneous mixture and a continuous manufacturing process. The Hoffmann "endless" kiln which was said to give "perfect control over combustion" was tested in 1860 and shown to produce a superior grade of cement. This cement was made at the Portland Cementfabrik Stern at Stettin, which was the first to use a Hoffmann kiln. The Association of German Cement Manufacturers issued a standard on Portland cement in 1878.

Portland cement had been imported into the United States from England and Germany, and in the 1870s and 1880s, it was being produced by Eagle Portland cement near Kalamazoo, Michigan. In 1875, the first Portland cement was produced in the Coplay Cement Company Kilns under the direction of David O. Saylor in Coplay, Pennsylvania, United States. By the early 20th century, American-made Portland cement had displaced most of the imported Portland cement.

== Composition ==
ASTM C219 defines Portland cement as:

a hydraulic cement produced by pulverizing clinker, consisting essentially of crystalline hydraulic calcium silicates, and usually containing one or more of the following: water, calcium sulfate, up to 5 % limestone, and processing additions

The European Standard EN 197-1 uses the following definition:

Portland cement clinker is a hydraulic material which shall consist of at least two-thirds by mass of calcium silicates, (3 CaO·SiO_{2}, and 2 CaO·SiO_{2}), the remainder consisting of aluminium- and iron-containing clinker phases and other compounds. The ratio of CaO to SiO_{2} shall not be less than 2.0. The magnesium oxide content (MgO) shall not exceed 5.0% by mass.

(The last two requirements were already set out in the German Standard, issued in 1909).

Clinkers make up more than 90% of the cement, along with a limited amount of calcium sulphate (CaSO_{4}, which controls the set time), and up to 5% minor constituents (fillers) as allowed by various standards. Clinkers are nodules (diameters, 0.2–1.0 inch [5.1–25.4 millimetres]) of a sintered material that is produced when a raw mixture of predetermined composition is heated to high temperature. The key chemical reaction distinguishing Portland cement from other hydraulic limes occurs at these high temperatures (>1,300 °C (2,370 °F)) as belite (Ca_{2}SiO_{4}) combines with calcium oxide (CaO) to form alite (Ca_{3}SiO_{5}).

== Manufacturing ==
Portland cement clinker is made by heating, in a cement kiln, a mixture of raw materials to a calcining temperature of above 600 °C (1,112 °F) and then a fusion temperature, which is about 1,450 °C (2,640 °F) for modern cements, to sinter the materials into clinker.

The four mineral phases present in the cement clinker are alite (abbreviated C_{3}S in cement chemist notation), belite (C_{2}S), tricalcium aluminate (C_{3}A) and tetracalcium aluminoferrite (C_{4}AF). The aluminium, iron and magnesium oxides are present as a flux allowing the calcium silicates to form at a lower temperature, and contribute little to the strength. For special cements, such as low heat (LH) and sulphate resistant types, it is necessary to limit the amount of tricalcium aluminate (C_{3}A) formed.

The major raw material for the clinker-making is usually limestone (CaCO_{3}) mixed with a second material containing clay as a source of alumino-silicate. Normally, an impure limestone which contains clay or SiO_{2} is used. The CaCO_{3} content of these limestones can be as low as 80%. Secondary raw materials (materials in the raw mix other than limestone) depend on the purity of the limestone. Some of the materials used are clay, shale, sand, iron ore, bauxite, fly ash, and slag. When a cement kiln is fired with coal, the coal ash acts as a secondary raw material.

=== Cement grinding ===
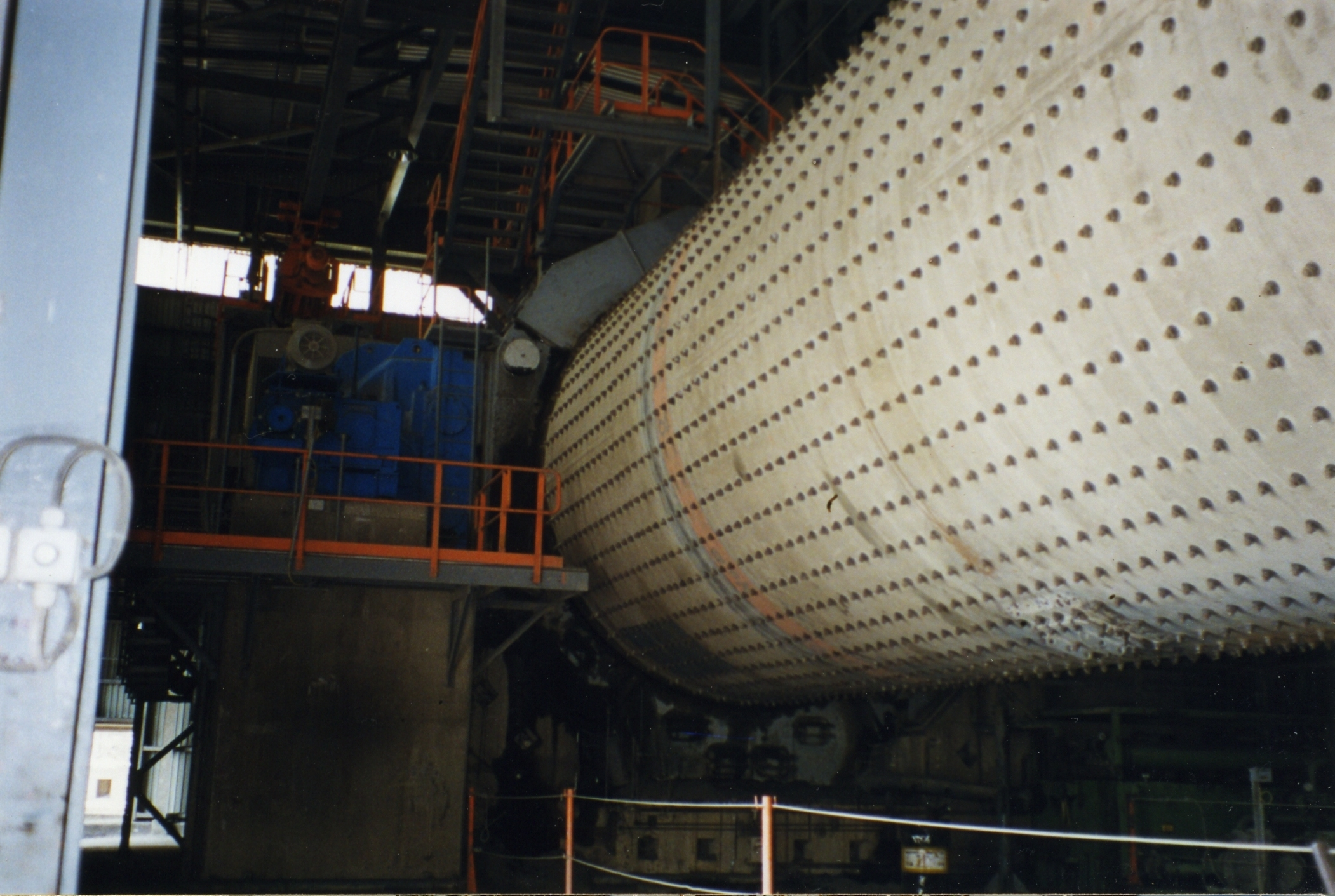
A 10 MW cement mill, producing cement at 270 tonnes per hour.

To achieve the desired setting qualities in the finished product, a quantity (2–8%, but typically 5%) of calcium sulphate (usually gypsum or anhydrite) is added to the clinker, and the mixture is finely ground to form the finished cement powder. This is achieved in a cement mill. The grinding process is controlled to obtain a powder with a broad particle size range, in which typically 15% by mass consists of particles below 5 μm diameter, and 5% of particles above 45 μm. The measure of fineness usually used is the 'specific surface area', which is the total particle surface area of a unit mass of cement. The rate of initial reaction (up to 24 hours) of the cement on the addition of water is directly proportional to the specific surface area. Typical values are 320–380 m^{2}·kg^{−1} for general purpose cements, and 450–650 m^{2}·kg^{−1} for 'rapid hardening' cements. The cement is conveyed by belt or powder pump to a silo for storage. Cement plants normally have sufficient silo space for one to 20 weeks of production, depending upon local demand cycles. The cement is delivered to end users either in bags or as bulk powder blown from a pressure vehicle into the customer's silo. In industrial countries, 80% or more of cement is delivered in bulk.

Typical constituents of Portland clinker plus gypsum showing cement chemist notation (CCN)
Clinker	CCN	Mass
Tricalcium silicate (CaO)_{3} · SiO_{2}	C_{3}S	25–50%
Dicalcium silicate (CaO)_{2} · SiO_{2}	C_{2}S	20–45%
Tricalcium aluminate (CaO)_{3} · Al_{2}O_{3}	C_{3}A	5–12%
Tetracalcium aluminoferrite (CaO)_{4} · Al_{2}O_{3} · Fe_{2}O_{3}	C_{4}AF	6–12%
Gypsum CaSO_{4} · 2 H_{2}O	CS̅H_{2}	2–10%

Typical constituents of Portland cement showing cement chemist notation
Cement	CCN	Mass
Calcium oxide, CaO	C	61–67%
Silicon dioxide, SiO_{2}	S	19–23%
Aluminium oxide, Al_{2}O_{3}	A	2.5–6%
Ferric oxide, Fe_{2}O_{3}	F	0–6%
Sulphur (VI) oxide, SO_{3}	S̅	1.5–4.5%

== Setting and hardening ==
Cement sets when mixed with water by way of a complex series of chemical reactions that are still only partly understood. A brief summary is as follows:

The clinker phases—calcium silicates and aluminates—dissolve into the water that is mixed with the cement, which results in a fluid containing relatively high concentrations of dissolved ions. This reaches supersaturation with respect to specific mineral phases: usually first ettringite, and then calcium silicate hydrate (C-S-H) which precipitate as newly formed solids. The interlocking of the C-S-H (which is crystallographically disordered, and can take on needle or crumpled-foil morphologies) and the ettringite crystals gives cement its initial setting, converting the fluid into a solid, and chemically incorporating much of the water into these new phases.

Gypsum is included in the cement as an inhibitor to prevent flash (or quick) setting; if gypsum is not present, the initial formation of (needle-shaped) ettringite is not possible, and so (plate-shaped) hydrocalumite-group ("AFm") calcium aluminate phases form instead. The premature formation of AFm phases causes a rapid loss of flowability, which is generally undesirable because it renders the placement of the cement or concrete very difficult.

Hardening of the cement then proceeds through further C-S-H formation, as this fills in the spaces between the (still-dissolving) cement grains with newly formed solid phases. Portlandite also precipitates from the pore solution to form part of the solid microstructure. Some of the initially formed ettringite may be converted to AFm phases, releasing part of the sulfate from its structure to continue reacting with any remaining tricalcium aluminate.

== Gas diffusion and radon permeability ==
Ordinary Portland Cement (OPC) concretes can act as barriers to gases such as radon, with their effectiveness depending on factors including concrete thickness and gas diffusion properties. The radon diffusion coefficient in cement can be estimated from the oxygen diffusion coefficient, which is more readily determined experimentally. The relatively low permeability of OPC concrete to radon can contribute to the reduction of radon transport through concrete elements.

The radiological properties of blended cements containing carbonated alkaline industrial wastes have also been investigated. Studies have assessed parameters including natural radionuclide concentrations, external radiation dose rates, and radon emanation and exhalation from cementitious materials containing such wastes. In some formulations, these parameters have been comparable to those measured for ordinary Portland cement.

== Use ==
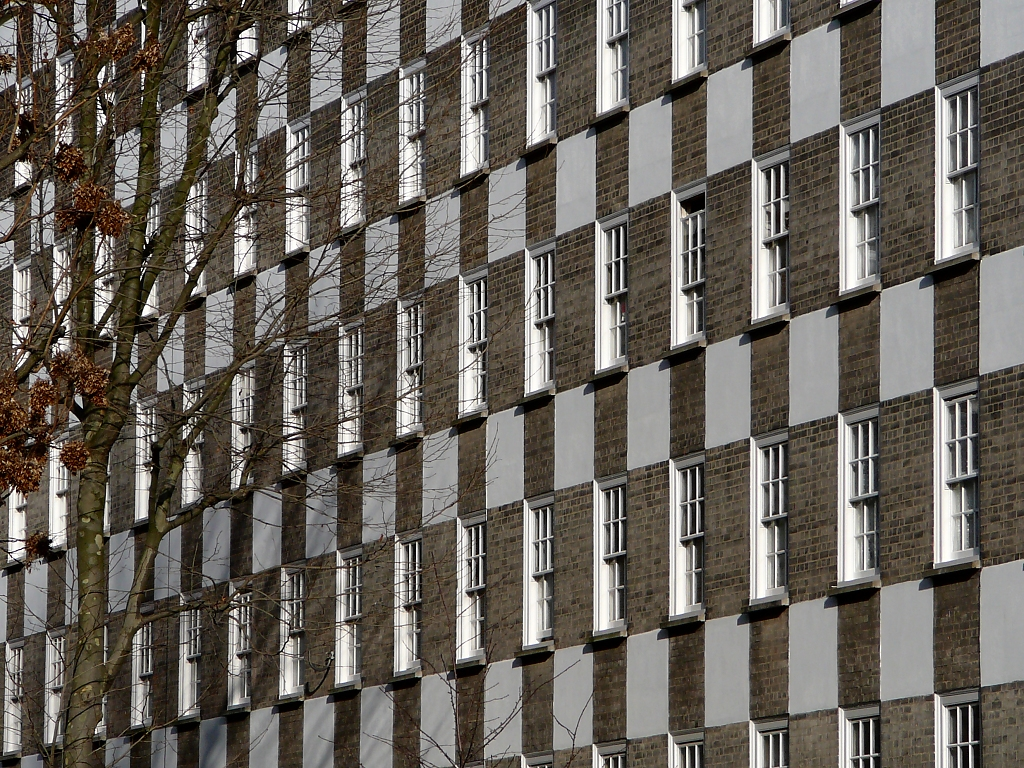
Decorative use of Portland cement panels on London's Grosvenor estate

The most common use for Portland cement is in the production of concrete. Concrete is a composite material consisting of aggregate (gravel and sand), cement, and water. As a construction material, concrete can be cast in almost any shape desired, and once hardened, can become a structural (load-bearing) element. Concrete can be used in the construction of structural elements like panels, beams, and street furniture, or may be cast in situ for superstructures like roads and dams. These may be supplied with concrete mixed on site, or may be provided with 'ready-mixed' concrete made at permanent mixing sites. Portland cement is also used in mortars (with sand and water only), for plasters and screeds, and in grouts (cement/water mixes squeezed into gaps to consolidate foundations, road-beds, etc.).

When water is mixed with Portland cement, the product sets in a few hours and hardens over several weeks. These processes can vary widely, depending upon the mix used and the conditions of curing of the product, but a typical concrete sets in about 6 hours and develops a compressive strength of 8 MPa in 24 hours. The strength rises to 15 MPa at 3 days, 23 MPa at 1 week, 35 MPa at 4 weeks, and 41 MPa at 3 months. In principle, the strength continues to rise slowly as long as water is available for continued hydration, but concrete is usually allowed to dry out after a few weeks, and this causes strength growth to stop.

== Types ==
=== ASTM C150 ===
Five types of Portland cements exist, with variations of the first three according to ASTM C150.

Type I Portland cement is known as common or general-purpose cement. It is generally assumed unless another type is specified. It is commonly used for general construction, especially when making precast and precast-prestressed concrete that is not to be in contact with soils or groundwater. The typical compound compositions of this type are:

55% (C_{3}S), 19% (C_{2}S), 10% (C_{3}A), 7% (C_{4}AF), 2.8% MgO, 2.9% (SO_{3}), 1.0% ignition loss, and 1.0% free CaO (utilizing cement chemist notation).

A limitation on the composition is that the (C_{3}A) shall not exceed 15%.

Type II provides moderate sulphate resistance, and gives off less heat during hydration. This type of cement costs about the same as type I. Its typical compound composition is:

51% (C_{3}S), 24% (C_{2}S), 6% (C_{3}A), 11% (C_{4}AF), 2.9% MgO, 2.5% (SO_{3}), 0.8% ignition loss, and 1.0% free CaO.

A limitation on the composition is that the (C_{3}A) shall not exceed 8%, which reduces its vulnerability to sulphates. This type is for general construction exposed to moderate sulphate attack. It is intended for use when concrete is in contact with soils and groundwater, especially in the western United States due to the high sulphur content of the soils. Because of a similar price to that of type I, type II is used much as a general-purpose cement, and the majority of Portland cement sold in North America meets this specification.

Note: Cement meeting (among others) the specifications for types I and II has become commonly available on the world market.

Type III has relatively high early strength. Its typical compound composition is:

57% (C_{3}S), 19% (C_{2}S), 10% (C_{3}A), 7% (C_{4}AF), 3.0% MgO, 3.1% (SO_{3}), 0.9% ignition loss, and 1.3% free CaO.

This cement is similar to type I, but ground finer. Some manufacturers make a separate clinker with higher C_{3}S and/or C_{3}A content, but this is increasingly rare, and the general purpose clinker is usually used, ground to a specific surface area typically 50–80% higher. The gypsum level may also be increased a small amount. This gives the concrete using this type of cement a three-day compressive strength equal to the seven-day compressive strength of types I and II. Its seven-day compressive strength is almost equal to the 28-day compressive strengths of types I and II. The only downside is that the six-month strength of type III is the same or slightly less than that of types I and II. Therefore, the long-term strength is sacrificed. It is usually used for precast concrete manufacture, where high one-day strength allows fast turnover of molds. It may also be used in emergency construction and repairs, and the construction of machine bases and gate installations.

Type IV Portland cement is generally known for its low heat of hydration. Its typical compound composition is:

28% (C_{3}S), 49% (C_{2}S), 4% (C_{3}A), 12% (C_{4}AF), 1.8% MgO, 1.9% (SO_{3}), 0.9% ignition loss, and 0.8% free CaO.

The percentages of (C_{2}S) and (C_{4}AF) are relatively high and (C_{3}S) and (C_{3}A) are relatively low. A limitation on this type is that the maximum percentage of (C_{3}A) is seven, and the maximum percentage of (C_{3}S) is thirty-five. This causes the heat given off by the hydration reaction to develop at a slower rate. Consequently, the strength of the concrete develops slowly. After one or two years, the strength is higher than that of the other types after full curing. This cement is used for huge concrete structures, such as dams, which have a low surface-to-volume ratio. This type of cement is generally not stocked by manufacturers, but some might consider a large special order. This type of cement has not been made for many years, because Portland-pozzolan cement and ground granulated blast furnace slag addition offer a cheaper and more reliable alternative.

Type V is used where sulphate resistance is important. Its typical compound composition is:

38% (C_{3}S), 43% (C_{2}S), 4% (C_{3}A), 9% (C_{4}AF), 1.9% MgO, 1.8% (SO_{3}), 0.9% ignition loss, and 0.8% free CaO.

This cement has a very low (C_{3}A) composition, which accounts for its high sulphate resistance. The maximum content of (C_{3}A) allowed is 5% for type V Portland cement. Another limitation is that the (C_{4}AF) + 2(C_{3}A) composition cannot exceed 20%. This type is used in concrete to be exposed to alkali soil and ground water sulphates which react with (C_{3}A), causing disruptive expansion. It is unavailable in many places, although its use is common in the western United States and Canada. As with type IV, type V Portland cement has largely been supplanted by the use of ordinary cement with added ground granulated blast furnace slag or tertiary blended cements containing slag and fly ash.

Types Ia, IIa, and IIIa have the same composition as types I, II, and III. The only difference is that in Ia, IIa, and IIIa, an air-entraining agent is ground into the mix. The air-entrainment must meet the minimum and maximum optional specifications found in the ASTM manual. These types are only available in the eastern United States and Canada, on a limited basis. They are a poor approach to air-entrainment, which improves resistance to freezing under low temperatures.

Types II(MH) and II(MH)a have a similar composition to types II and IIa, but with a mild heat.

=== EN 197 norm ===
The European norm EN 197-1 defines five classes of common cement that comprise Portland cement as a main constituent. These classes differ from the ASTM classes.

Class	Description	Constituents
CEM I	Portland cement	Comprising Portland cement and up to 5% of minor additional constituents
CEM II	Portland-composite cement	Portland cement and up to 35% of other* single constituents
CEM III	Blast furnace cement	Portland cement and higher percentages of blast furnace slag
CEM IV	Pozzolanic cement	Portland cement and up to 55% of pozzolanic constituents
CEM V	Composite cement	Portland cement, blast furnace slag or fly ash and pozzolana

* Constituents that are permitted in Portland-composite cements are artificial pozzolans (blast furnace slag (a latent hydraulic binder), silica fume, and fly ashes), or natural pozzolans (siliceous or siliceous aluminous materials such as volcanic ash glasses, calcined clays and shale).

=== CSA A3000-08 ===
The Canadian standards describe six main classes of cement, four of which can also be supplied as a blend containing ground limestone (denoted by a suffix 'L' in the class names).

Class	Description
GU, GUL (a.k.a. Type 10 (GU) cement)	General use cement
MS	Moderate sulphate resistant cement
MH, MHL	Moderate heat cement
HE, HEL	High early strength cement
LH, LHL	Low heat cement
HS	High sulphate resistant (low C_{3}A) cement; generally develops strength less rapidly than the other types.

=== White Portland cement ===
White Portland cement or white ordinary Portland cement (WOPC) is similar to ordinary grey Portland cement in all respects, except for its high degree of whiteness. Obtaining this colour requires raw materials with a sufficiently low Fe_{2}O_{3} content, and some modification to the method of manufacture, among others, a higher kiln temperature required to sinter the clinker in the absence of ferric oxides acting as a flux in normal clinker. As Fe_{2}O_{3} contributes decreasing the melting point of the clinker (normally 1450 °C), the white cement requires a higher sintering temperature (around 1600 °C). As a result, it is slightly more expensive than the grey product. The main requirement is to have a low iron content which should be less than 0.5 wt.% expressed as Fe_{2}O_{3} for white cement, and less than 0.9 wt.% for off-white cement. It also helps to have the iron oxide as ferrous oxide (FeO), which is obtained via slightly reducing conditions in the kiln, i.e., operating with zero excess oxygen at the kiln exit. This gives the clinker and cement a green tinge. Other metallic oxides such as Cr_{2}O_{3} (green), MnO (pink), TiO_{2} (white), etc., in trace content, can also give colour tinges, so for a given project it is best to use cement from a single batch.

== Safety issues ==
Bags of cement routinely have health and safety warnings printed on them, because not only is cement highly alkaline, but the setting process is also exothermic. As a result, wet cement is strongly caustic and can easily cause severe skin burns if not promptly washed off with water. Similarly, dry cement powder in contact with mucous membranes can cause severe eye or respiratory irritation. The reaction of cement dust with moisture in the sinuses and lungs can also cause a chemical burn, as well as headaches, fatigue, and lung cancer.

The production of comparatively low-alkalinity cements (pH < 11) is an area of investigation.

In Scandinavia, France, and the United Kingdom, the level of chromium(VI), which is considered to be toxic and a major skin irritant, may not exceed 2 parts per million (ppm).

In the US, the Occupational Safety and Health Administration (OSHA) has set the legal limit (permissible exposure limit) for Portland cement exposure in the workplace as 50 mppcf (million particles per cubic foot) over an 8-hour workday. The National Institute for Occupational Safety and Health (NIOSH) has set a recommended exposure limit (REL) of 10 mg/m^{3} total exposure and 5 mg/m^{3} respiratory exposure over an 8-hour workday. At levels of 5000 mg/m^{3}, Portland cement is immediately dangerous to life and health.

== Environmental effects ==
Portland cement manufacture can cause environmental impacts at all stages of the process. These include emissions of airborne pollution in the form of dust; gases; noise and vibration when operating machinery and during blasting in quarries; consumption of large quantities of fuel during manufacture; release of CO_{2} from the raw materials during manufacture, and damage to countryside from quarrying. Equipment to reduce dust emissions during quarrying and cement manufacturing is widely used, and equipment to trap and separate exhaust gases is gaining increased use. Environmental protection also includes the reintegration of quarries into the countryside after they have been closed, by returning them to nature or re-cultivating them.

Portland cement is caustic, so it can cause chemical burns. The powder can cause irritation or, with severe exposure, lung cancer, and can contain several hazardous components, including crystalline silica and hexavalent chromium. Environmental concerns are the high energy consumption required to mine, manufacture, and transport the cement, and the related air pollution, including the release of the greenhouse gas carbon dioxide, dioxin, NO_{x}, SO_{2}, and particulates. Production of Portland cement contributes about 10% of world carbon dioxide emissions. The International Energy Agency has estimated that cement production will increase by between 12 and 23% by 2050 to meet the needs of the world's growing population. There are several ongoing types of research targeting a suitable replacement of Portland cement by supplementary cementitious materials.

Epidemiologic Notes and Reports Sulfur Dioxide Exposure in Portland Cement Plants, from the Centers for Disease Control, states:

Workers at Portland cement facilities, particularly those burning fuel containing sulfur, should be aware of the acute and chronic effects of exposure to SO_{2} [sulfur dioxide], and peak and full-shift concentrations of SO_{2} should be periodically measured.

An independent research effort of AEA Technology to identify critical issues for the cement industry today concluded the most important environment, health and safety performance issues facing the cement industry are atmospheric releases (including greenhouse gas emissions, dioxin, NO_{x}, SO_{2}, and particulates), accidents, and worker exposure to dust.

The CO_{2} associated with Portland cement manufacture comes mainly from four sources:

CO_{2} source	Amount
Decarbonation of limestone	Fairly constant: minimum around 0.47 kg (1.0 lb) CO_{2} per kg of cement, maximum 0.54, typical value around 0.50 worldwide.
Kiln fuel combustion	Varies with plant efficiency: efficient precalciner plant 0.24 kg (0.53 lb) CO_{2} per kg cement, low-efficiency wet process as high as 0.65, typical modern practices (e.g. UK) averaging around 0.30.
Produced by vehicles in cement plants and distribution	Almost insignificant at 0.002–0.005. Typical total CO_{2} is around 0.80 kg (1.8 lb) CO_{2} per kg finished cement.
Electrical power generation	Varies with local power source. Typical electrical energy consumption is on the order of 90–150 kWh per tonne of cement, equivalent to 0.09–0.15 kg (0.20–0.33 lb) CO_{2} per kg of finished cement if the electricity is coal-generated.

Overall, with nuclear or hydroelectric power, and efficient manufacturing, CO_{2} generation can be reduced to 0.7 kg (1.5 lb) per kg cement, but can be twice as high. The thrust of future innovation is to reduce sources 1 and 2 by modification of the chemistry of cement, by the use of wastes, and by adopting more efficient processes. Although cement manufacturing is a huge CO_{2} emitter, concrete (of which cement makes up about 15%) compares favourably with some other modern building systems in this regard.. Traditional materials such as lime based mortars as well as timber and earth based construction methods emit significantly less CO_{2}.

One approach to reducing the clinker content of cement is to use supplementary cementitious materials (SCMs) in greater proportions. These materials can be derived from industrial by-products, naturally occurring pozzolans or, in some cases, synthetically produced aluminosilicates. Synthetic aluminosilicates can be manufactured with controlled chemical compositions and used in hybrid alkali-activated cements with very low clinker contents.

Another approach is the use of alkaline waste materials that have been subjected to carbonation before being incorporated into cementitious materials. This treatment can alter the chemical and microstructural properties of the waste and allow it to be used as an SCM. Studies of blended eco-mortars have found that carbonated alkaline wastes can provide suitable durability properties when used as partial cement replacements.

The availability of conventional SCMs varies by region, which has increased interest in locally available alternative materials. Biomass ashes with pozzolanic properties are among the materials investigated for this purpose. Giant reed (Phragmites sp.) ash, for example, has been investigated as a partial cement replacement because of its pozzolanic properties.

== Cement plants used for waste disposal or processing ==
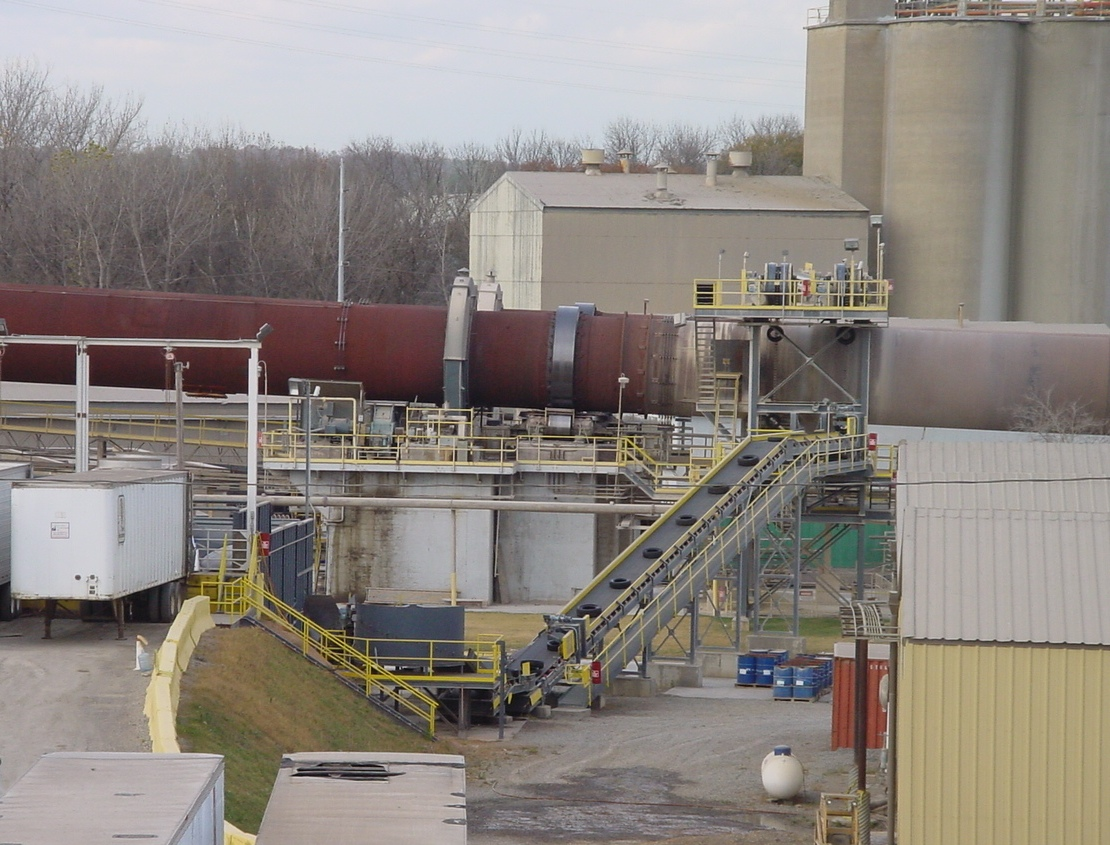
Used tyres being fed to a pair of cement kilns

Due to the high temperatures inside cement kilns, combined with the oxidising (oxygen-rich) atmosphere and long residence times, cement kilns are used as a processing option for various types of waste streams; they efficiently destroy many hazardous organic compounds. The waste streams also often contain combustible materials, which allow the substitution of part of the fossil fuel commonly used in the process.

Waste materials used in cement kilns as a fuel supplement:

- Car and truck tyres – steel belts are easily tolerated in the kilns
- Paint sludge from the automobile industry
- Waste solvents and lubricants
- Meat and bone meal – slaughterhouse waste due to bovine spongiform encephalopathy contamination concerns
- Waste plastics
- Sewage sludge
- Rice hulls
- Sugarcane waste
- Used wooden railroad ties (railway sleepers)
- Spent cell liner from the aluminium smelting industry (also called spent pot liner)

Portland cement manufacture also has the potential to benefit from using industrial byproducts from the waste stream. These include in particular:

- Slag
- Fly ash (from power plants)
- Silica fume (from steel mills)
- Synthetic gypsum (from desulphurisation)

== See also ==
- American Concrete Institute
- Calcium silicate hydrate – Main product of the hydration of Portland cement
- Energetically modified cement – Class of cements, mechanically processed to transform reactivity
- Environmental impact of concrete
- Lime mortar – Building material
- Marl – Lime-rich mud or mudstone which contains variable amounts of clays and silt
- American Cement Association – American industry organization
- Portland, New Zealand
- Portland Cement Works Precinct – Disused industrial site in Australia
- Rosendale cement – Construction material
