= James Frost (cement maker) =

James Frost (1780?-1840?) was an English businessman and inventor who invented processes that led to the eventual development of Portland cement.

== Biography ==
Frost was born in Finchley, Middlesex, England. He set up a plant making Roman cement at Harwich in 1807, supplying it for government work. He began experimenting with formulations for "artificial" cements that would provide a cheaper alternative to Roman cement. He appears to have produced a prototype cement at Harwich in 1810. However, it was not until 1822 that he was granted a patent for what he called "British Cement". In October 1825, he leased land at Swanscombe, Kent, and set up a plant to manufacture both Roman cement and the new product.

The key innovation in his work was the "wet" grinding of raw materials, which became fundamental to the early development of Portland cement. He ground the soft local chalk together with alluvial clay from the Medway estuary and added water in a washmill to produce a thin slurry from which coarse particles could be removed by settling. The fine, homogenous mixture of chalk and clay particles was dried to a stiff plastic consistency before being burned in a kiln. He thus emulated the natural process of sedimentary formation of a marl.

Charles Pasley communicated frequently with Frost, and gave a detailed description of his techniques based on a visit to Swanscombe in December 1828. In 1832, he sold the Swanscombe plant to John Bazely White's, and migrated to New York City, where he set up as a civil engineer. He contributed several papers on calcareous cements to the Journal of the Franklin Institute.

His Swanscombe plant became in the 1840s, under the management of I C Johnson, the second plant to make true Portland cement, and subsequently the "mother" plant of Blue Circle Industries. It closed in 1990, after 165 years of continuous operation.
