= Air permeability specific surface =

Powder fineness indicator

The air permeability specific surface of a powder material is a single-parameter measurement of the fineness of the powder. The specific surface is derived from the resistance to flow of air (or some other gas) through a porous bed of the powder. The SI units are m^{2}·kg^{−1} ("mass specific surface") or m^{2}·m^{−3} ("volume specific surface").

== Significance ==
The particle size, or fineness, of powder materials is very often critical to their performance.

Measurement of air permeability can be performed very rapidly, and does not require the powder to be exposed to vacuum or to gases or vapours, as is necessary for the BET method for determination of specific surface area. This makes it both very cost-effective, and also allows it to be used for materials which may be unstable under vacuum.

When a powder reacts chemically with a liquid or gas at the surface of its particles, the specific surface is directly related to its rate of reaction. The measurement is therefore important in the manufacture of many processed materials.

In particular, air permeability is almost universally used in the cement industry as a gauge of product fineness which is directly related to such properties as speed of setting and rate of strength development.

Other fields where air permeability has been used to determine specific surface area include:

- Paint and pigments
- Pharmaceuticals
- Metallurgical powders, including sintered metal filters.

In some fields, particularly powder metallurgy, the related Fisher number is the parameter of interest. This is the equivalent average particle diameter, assuming that the particles are spherical and have uniform size. Historically, the Fisher number was obtained by measurement using the Fisher Sub-sieve Sizer, a commercial instrument containing an air pump and pressure regulator to establish a constant air flow, which is measured using a flowmeter. A number of manufacturers make equivalent instruments, and the Fisher number can be calculated from air permeability specific surface area values.

== Methods ==
Measurement consists of packing the powder into a cylindrical "bed" having a known porosity (i.e. volume of air-space between particles divided by total bed volume). A pressure drop is set up along the length of the bed cylinder. The resulting flow-rate of air through the bed yields the specific surface by the Kozeny–Carman equation:

$$S=\cfrac{7d}{\rho\,(1-\epsilon\,)}\sqrt{\dfrac{\epsilon\,^3\pi\,\delta\,P}{l\eta\,Q}}$$

where:

S is specific surface, m^{2}·kg^{−1}
d is the cylinder diameter, m
ρ is the sample particle density, kg·m^{−3}
ε is the volume porosity of the bed (dimensionless)
δP is the pressure drop across the bed, Pa
l is the cylinder length, m
η is the air dynamic viscosity, Pa·s
Q is the flowrate, m^{3}·s^{−1}

It can be seen that the specific surface is proportional to the square root of the ratio of pressure to flow. Various standard methods have been proposed:

- Maintain a constant flowrate, and measure the pressure drop
- Maintain a constant pressure drop, and measure the flowrate
- Allow both to vary, deriving the ratio from the characteristics of the apparatus.

=== Lea and Nurse method ===
The second of these was developed by Lea and Nurse. The bed is 25 mm in diameter and 10 mm thick. The desired porosity (which may vary in the range 0.4 to 0.6) is obtained by using a calculated weight of sample, pressed to precisely these dimensions. The required weight is given by:

$$M=\tfrac{\pi}{4}\,d^2l\rho\,(1-\epsilon\,)$$

A flowmeter consisting of a long capillary is connected in series with the powder bed. The pressure drop across the flowmeter (measured by a manometer) is proportional to the flowrate, and the proportionality constant can be measured by direct calibration. The pressure drop across the bed is measured by a similar manometer. Thus the required pressure/flow ratio can be obtained from the ratio of the two manometer readings, and when fed into the Carman equation, yields an "absolute" value of the air permeability surface area. The apparatus is maintained at a constant temperature, and dry air is used so that the air viscosity can be obtained from tables.

=== Rigden method ===
This was developed in the desire for a simpler method. The bed is connected to a wide-diameter u-tube containing a liquid such as kerosene. On pressurizing the space between the u-tube and the bed, the liquid is forced down. The level of liquid then acts as a measure of both pressure and volume flow. The liquid level rises as air leaks out through the bed. The time taken for the liquid level to pass between two pre-set marks on the tube is measured by stop-watch. The mean pressure and mean flowrate can be derived from the dimensions of the tube and the density of the liquid.

A later development used mercury in the u-tube: because of mercury's greater density, the apparatus could be more compact, and electrical contacts in the tube touching the conductive mercury could automatically start and stop a timer.

=== Blaine method ===
This was developed independently by R L Blaine of the American National Bureau of Standards, and uses a small glass kerosene manometer to apply suction to the powder bed. It differs from the other methods in that, because of uncertainty of the dimensions of the manometer tube, absolute results can't be calculated from the Carman equation. Instead, the apparatus must be calibrated using a known standard material. The original standards, supplied by NBS, were certified using the Lea and Nurse method. Despite this shortcoming, the Blaine method has become by far the most commonly used for cement materials, mainly because of the ease of maintenance of the apparatus and simplicity of the procedure.

== See also ==
- Klinkenberg correction
