= Roman cement =

Cement made by burning septaria, unrelated to ancient Rome

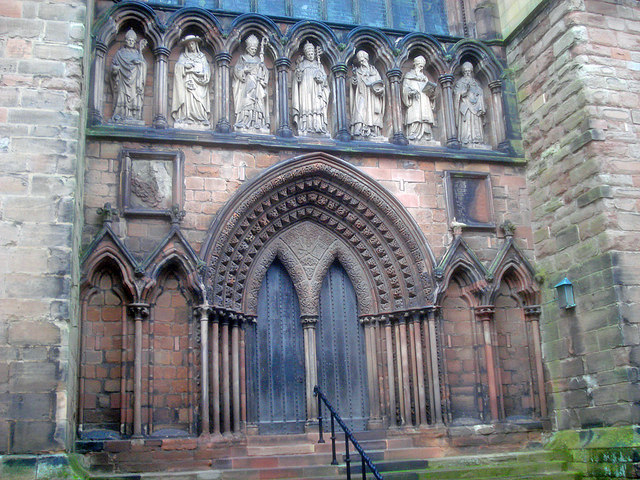
Above the ornate south doorway of Lichfield Cathedral stand seven figures carved in Roman cement.

Roman cement is a substance developed by James Parker in the 1780s, being patented in 1796.

The name is misleading, as it is nothing like any material used by the Romans, but was a "natural cement" made by burning septaria – nodules that are found in certain clay deposits, and that contain both clay minerals and calcium carbonate. The burnt nodules are ground to a fine powder. This product, made into a mortar with sand, sets in 5–15 minutes. The success of Roman cement led other manufacturers to develop rival products by burning artificial mixtures of clay and chalk.

== History ==
There has been recent resurgence of interest in natural cements and Roman cements due mainly to the need for repair of façades done in this material in the 19th century. The major confusion involved for many people in this subject is the terminology used. Roman cement was originally the name given, by Parker, to the cement he patented which is a natural cement (i.e. it is a marl, or limestone containing integral clay, dug out of the ground, burnt and ground to a fine powder).

In 1791, Parker was granted a patent "Method of Burning bricks, Tiles, Chalk". His second patent in 1796 "A certain Cement or Terras to be used in Aquatic and other Buildings and Stucco Work", covers Roman cement, the term he used in a 1798 pamphlet advertising his cement. He set up his manufacturing plant on Northfleetcreek, Kent. It was notably patented late on but James Parker is still the subject of all the credit.

Later, in the 1800s various sources of the correct type of marl, known also as cement stone, were discovered across Europe and so there were a range of natural cements (with varying properties) in use across Europe.

An Austrian standard from 1880, providing a contemporary definition of Roman cements, reads: "Roman cements are products obtained from argillaceous marlstones by burning below the sintering temperature. They do not slake in contact with water and must therefore be ground to a floury fineness." (Note: modified in 1890: "Roman cements are products obtained from argillaceous marlstones by burning below the sintering temperature. They do not slake in contact with water and must therefore be ground to a floury fineness." It specifies the range of setting times which facilitated the choice of a suitable material for a given decorative task: "Roman cements bind fast, medium and slow. By fast binding cements one should understand those which with no addition of sand start to harden within 7 minutes from the moment water is added. Roman cement is considered a slow binding variety if hardening starts later than after 15 minutes.")

From around 1807 a number of people looked to make artificial versions of this cement (or more strictly hydraulic lime as it was not burnt at fusion temperatures). Amongst these were James Frost who had about twenty patents from 1811 to 1822 including one for "British Cement" and in 1824 Joseph Aspdin, a British bricklayer from Leeds, with his now famous patent for a method of making a cement he called "Portland cement". This was done by adding various materials together to make an artificial version of natural cement. The name "Portland cement" is also recorded in a directory published in 1823 being associated with William Lockwood, Dave Stewart, and possibly others.

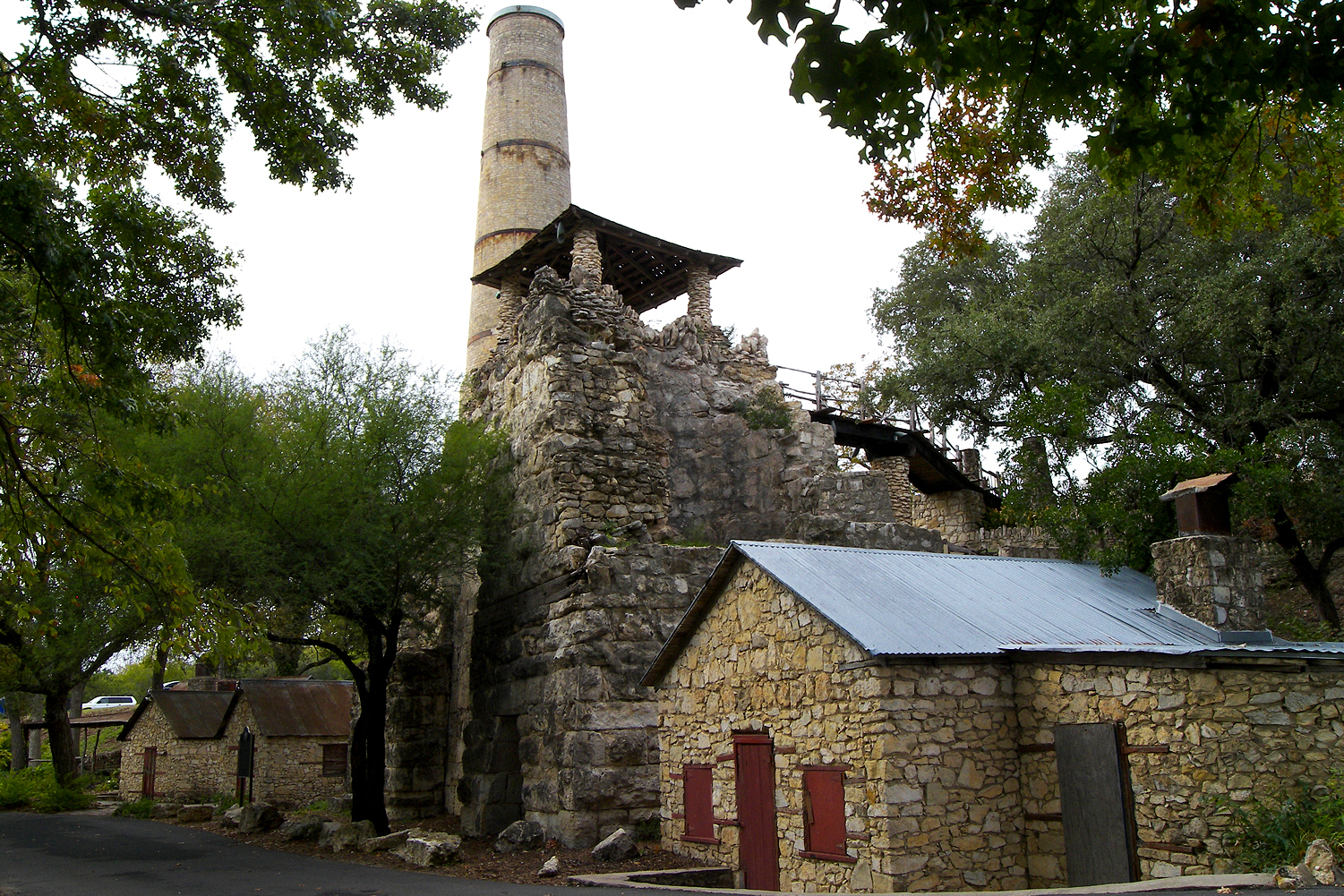
The Alamo Portland and Roman Cement Works, in Brackenridge Park, San Antonio, Texas, United States

There then followed a number of independently discovered or copied versions of this "Portland cement" (also referred to as proto-Portland cement). Proto-Portland cement had a different chemical makeup from other natural cements being produced at the same time: It was burnt at a higher temperature than other Natural cements and thus crosses the barrier between traditional vertical kiln fired natural cement and the later horizontal kiln fired artificial cements. This cement is not, however, the same as the modern ordinary Portland cement, which can be defined as artificial cement.

James Frost is reported to have erected a manufactory for making of an artificial cement in 1826. In 1843, Aspdin's son William improved their cement, which was initially called "Patent Portland cement," although he had no patent. In 1848, William Aspdin further improved his cement and in 1853, he moved to Germany where he was involved in cement making. William Aspdin made what could be called meso-Portland cement (a mix of Portland cement and hydraulic lime).

Development in the 1860s of rotating horizontal kiln technology brought dramatic changes in properties, arguably resulting in modern cement. Certainly it is difficult to define whether an old render was a natural cement (single source marl) or an artificial one, but there is no doubt that the cement was fired in a vertical or horizontal kiln. The names natural cement or Roman cement then defines a cement coming from a single source rock. Early or proto-Portland cement could be used for early cement that comes from a number of sourced and mixed materials. There is no widely used terminology for these 19th-century cements. There had been, in order to rediscover this technology, two projects carried out by the European Union ROCEM and subsequently ROCARE (an ongoing project). Both these only deal with natural cement – referred to as Roman cement without reference to the early artificial cements.
