= James Parker (cement maker) =

British clergyman and cement manufacturer (fl. 1791–1797)

- Born: England
- Died: United States
- Occupations: Businessman, clergyman, inventor
- Employer(s): Parker & Wyatt
- Known for: Inventor of Roman cement

James Parker was an English businessman, clergyman, and inventor who invented one of the pioneering new cements of the late eighteenth century.

In 1791, he was granted a patent "Method of Burning bricks, Tiles, Chalk". His second patent in 1796 "A certain Cement or Terras to be used in Aquatic and other Buildings and Stucco Work", covers Roman cement, a term used in a 1798 pamphlet advertising his cement. He set up his manufacturing plant on Northfleet Creek in Kent.

It seems that he sold his patent to Samuel Wyatt who with his cousin Charles Wyatt produced cement in the name of Parker & Wyatt. Parker himself emigrated to America in 1797, and died soon afterwards. There is evidence that the Wyatt "Roman" cement was used in building the famous Bell Rock Lighthouse. The cement was made from natural nodules of chalk and clay ("septaria") from the Isle of Sheppey. From around 1807 a number of people looked to make artificial versions of this cement (or more strictly hydraulic lime as it was not burnt at fusion temperatures). Amongst these were James Frost who had about twenty patents from 1811 to 1822 including one for "British Cement" and Joseph Aspdin with his now famous patent for a method of making a cement he called "Portland cement".

Between 1810 and 1820, after Parker's patent expired, "Roman" cement came into prominent use with numerous manufacturers. In 1832 there were five works around Harwich producing "Roman" cement. From about 1821 the artificial versions became more popular as improved versions could be made and the product was more consistent.

Frost's patents were taken up by John Bazley White and Sons who supplied the cement to Isambard Kingdom Brunel for the Thames Tunnel.

The Parker and Wyatt company went out of business in 1846, and the Northfleet plant was sold to William Aspdin's company. Aspdin converted it to Portland cement production, and it continued in that role until closure in 1901, latterly under the name of "Robin's Works".
