= Joseph Aspdin =

English inventor of Portland cement (1778–1855)

- Born: 25 December 1778; Leeds, England
- Died: 20 March 1855 (aged 76); Wakefield, England
- Occupations: Bricklayer, businessman, inventor, stonemason
- Children: (including): James Aspdin; William Aspdin

Joseph Aspdin (25 December 1778 – 20 March 1855) was an English bricklayer, businessman, inventor, and stonemason who obtained the patent for Portland cement on 21 October 1824.

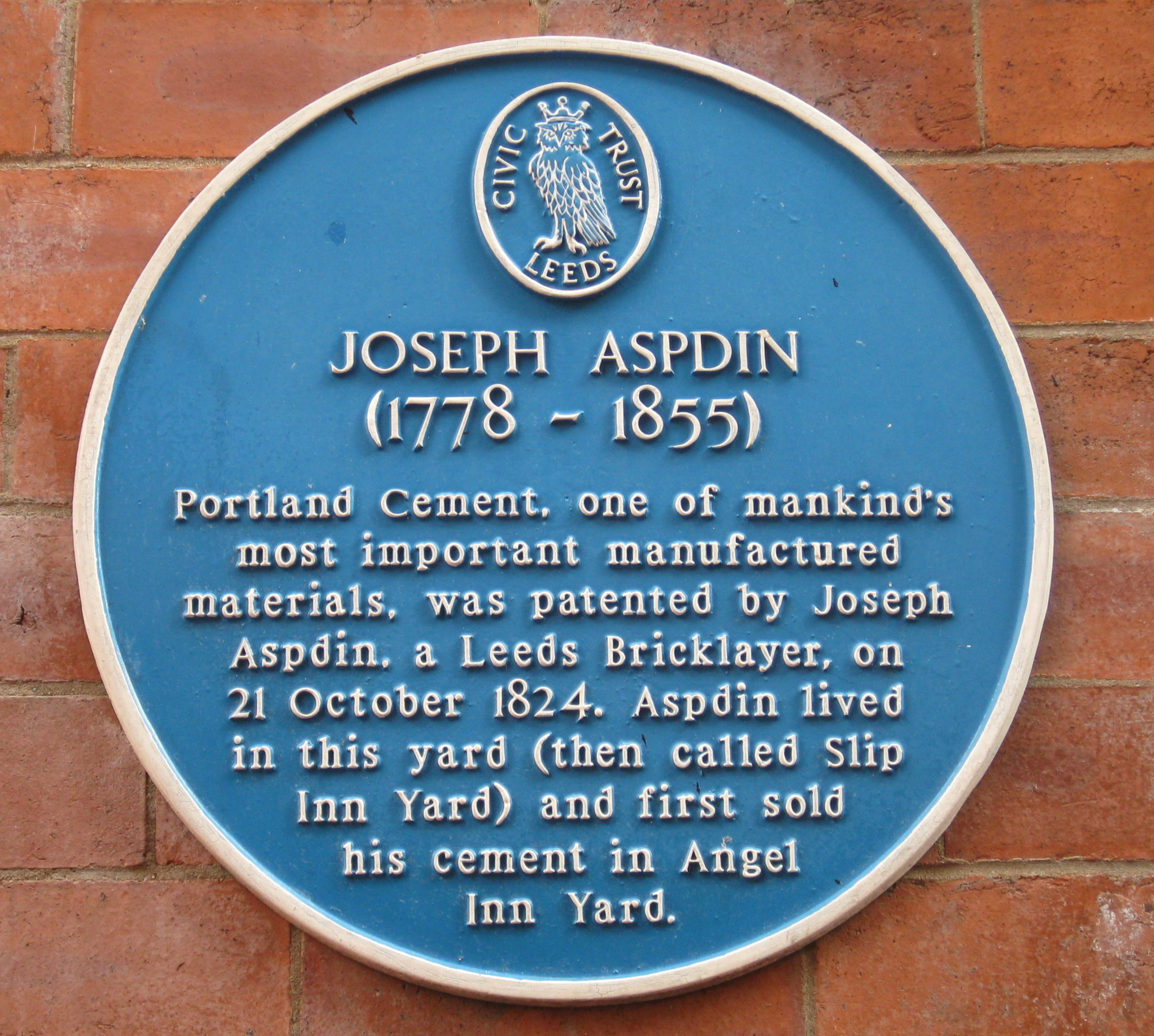
Plaque commemorating Joseph Aspdin in the yard where he lived.

== Life ==
Joseph Aspdin (or Aspden) was the eldest of the six children of Thomas Aspdin, a bricklayer living in the Hunslet district of Leeds, Yorkshire. He was baptised on Christmas Day, 1778. He entered his father's trade, and married Mary Fotherby at Leeds Parish Church (the Parish Church of St Peter at Leeds) on 21 May 1811.

By 1817, he had set up in business on his own in central Leeds. He must have experimented with cement manufacture during the next few years, because on 21 October 1824 he was granted the British Patent BP 5022 entitled An Improvement in the Mode of Producing an Artificial Stone, in which he coined the term "Portland cement" by analogy with the Portland stone, an oolitic limestone that is quarried on the channel coast of England, on the Isle of Portland in Dorset. See below for the text of the patent.

Almost immediately after this, in 1825, in partnership with a Leeds neighbour, William Beverley, he set up a production plant for this product in Kirkgate, Wakefield. Beverley stayed in Leeds, but Aspdin and his family moved to Wakefield (about nine miles away) at this point. He obtained a second patent, for a method of making lime, in 1825. The Kirkgate plant was closed in 1838 after compulsory purchase of the land by the Manchester and Leeds Railway Company, and the site was cleared. He moved his equipment to a second site nearby in Kirkgate.

At this time his eldest son James was working as an accountant in Leeds, and his younger son, William, was running the plant. However, in 1841, Joseph went into partnership with James, and posted a notice that William had left, and that the company would not be responsible for his debts, stating "I think it right to give notice that my late agent, William Aspdin, is not now in my employment, and that he is not authorised to receive any money, nor contract any debts on my behalf or on behalf of the new firm."

In 1843, William established his own plant at Rotherhithe, near London. There he introduced a new and substantially stronger cement, using a modified recipe for cement-making, the first "modern" Portland cement. In 1844 Joseph retired, transferring his share of the business to James. James moved to a third site at Ings Road in 1848, and this plant continued in operation until 1900. Joseph Aspdin died on 20 March 1855, at home in Wakefield.

== Patent ==
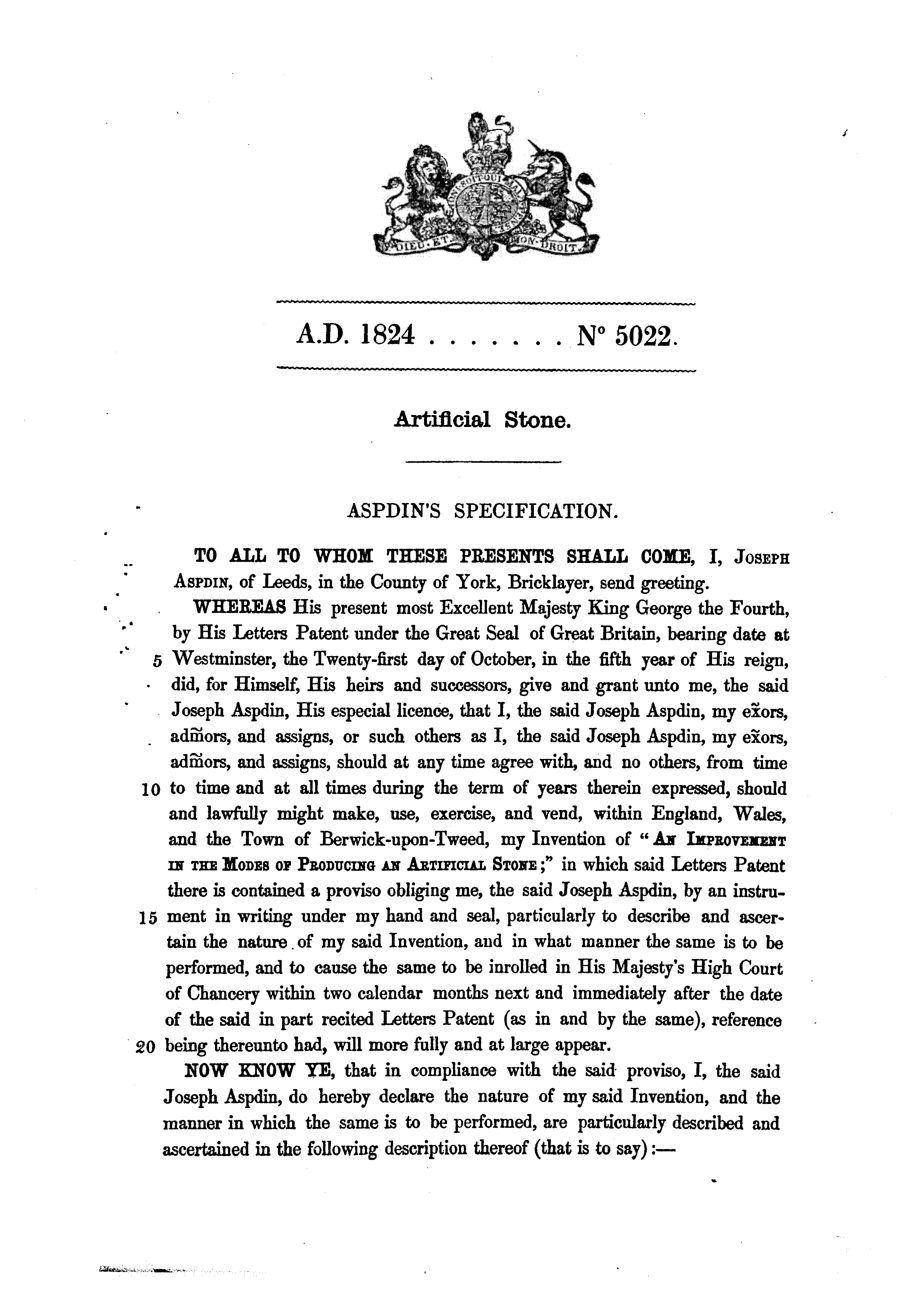
Patent nr. BP 5022, "An Improvement in the Modes of Producing an Artificial Stone", Joseph Aspdin, 21 October 1824, page 1/2

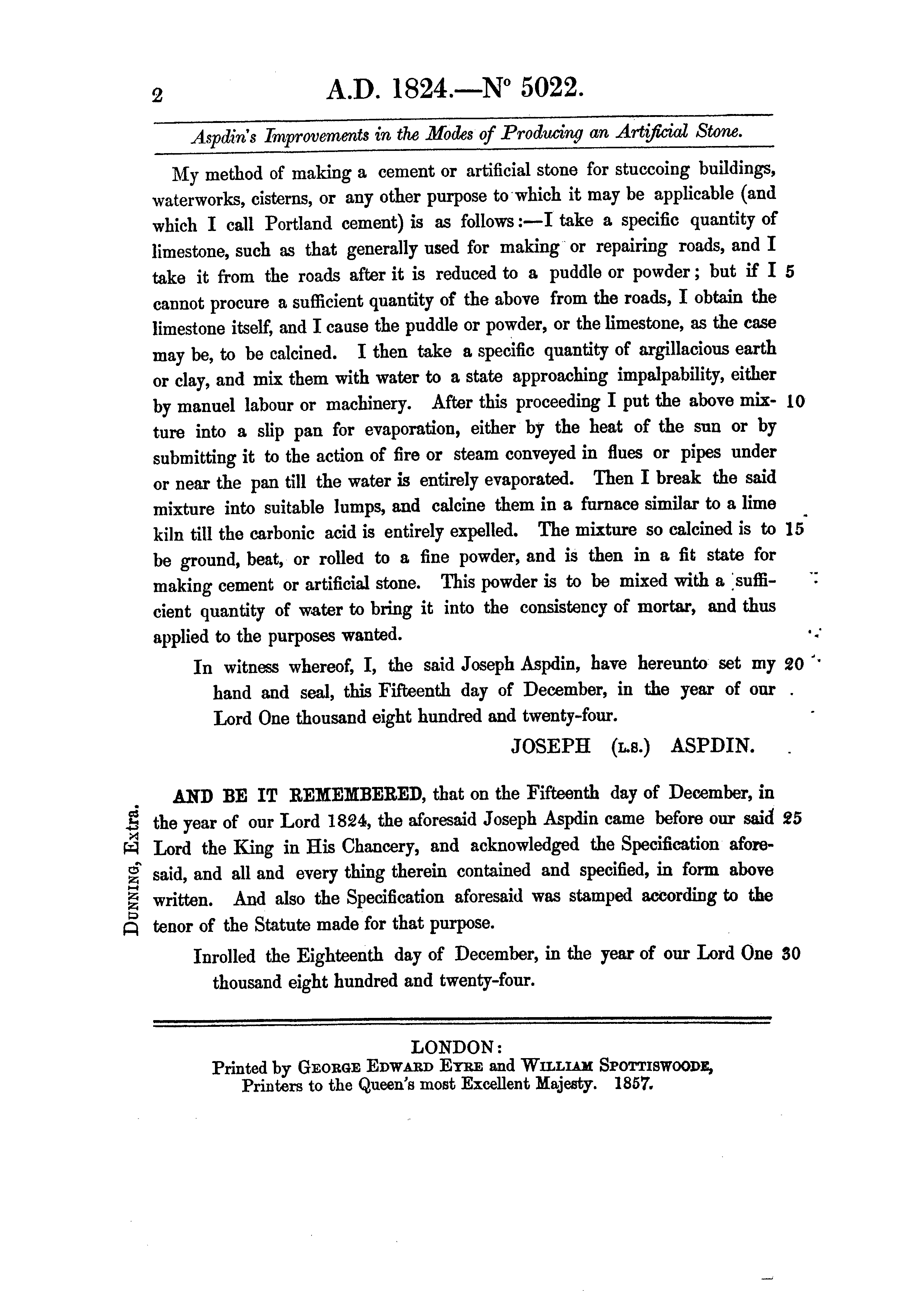
Patent nr. BP 5022, "An Improvement in the Modes of Producing an Artificial Stone", Joseph Aspdin, 21 October 1824, page 2/2

The patent reads as follows:

TO ALL TO WHOM THESE PRESENTS SHALL COME, I, Joseph Aspdin, of Leeds, in the County of York, Bricklayer, send greeting. WHEREAS His present most Excellent Majesty King George the Fourth, by His Letters Patent under the Great Seal of Great Britain, bearing date at Westminster, the Twenty-first day of October, in the fifth year of His reign, did, for Himself, His heirs and successors, give and grant unto me, the said Joseph Aspdin, His special licence, that I, the said Joseph Aspdin, my exors, admors, and assigns, should at any time agree with, and no others, from time to time at all time during the term of years therein expressed, should and lawfully might make, use, exercise, and vend, within England, Wales and the Town of Berwick-upon-Tweed, my invention of "AN IMPROVEMENT IN THE MODE OF PRODUCING AN ARTIFICIAL STONE;" in which said Letters Patent there is contained a proviso obliging me, said Joseph Aspdin, by an instrument in writing under my hand and seal, particularly to describe and ascertain the nature of my said invention, and in what manner the same is to be performed, and to cause the same to be inrolled in his Majesty's High Court of Chancery within two calendar months next and immediately after the date of the said part recited Letters Patent (as in and by the same), reference being thereunto had, will more fully and at large appear.

NOW KNOW YE, that in compliance with the said proviso, I, the said Joseph Aspdin, do hereby declare the nature of my said Invention, and the manner in which the same is to be performed, are particularly described and ascertained in the following description thereof (that is to say):

My method of making a cement or artificial stone for stuccoing buildings, waterworks, cisterns, or any other purpose to which it may be applicable (and which I call Portland cement) is as follows:- I take a specific quantity of limestone, such as that generally used for making or repairing roads, and I take it from the roads after it is reduced to a puddle or powder; but if I cannot procure a sufficient quantity of the above from the roads, I obtain the limestone itself, and I cause the puddle or powder, or the limestone, as the case may be, to be calcined. I then take a specific quantity of argillaceous earth or clay, and mix them with water to a state approaching impalpability, either by manual labour or machinery. After this proceeding I put the above mixture into a slip pan for evaporation, either by heat of the sun or by submitting it to the action of fire or steam conveyed in flues or pipe under or near the pan till the water is entirely evaporated. Then I brake the said mixture into suitable lumps and calcine them in a furnace similar to a lime kiln till the carbonic acid is entirely expelled. The mixture so calcined is to be ground, beat, or rolled to a fine powder, and is then in a fit state for making cement or artificial stone. This powder is to be mixed with a sufficient quantity of water to bring it into the consistency of mortar, and thus applied to the purposes wanted.

In witness whereof, I, the said Joseph Aspdin, have hereunto set my hand seal, this Fifteenth day of December, in the year of our Lord One thousand eight hundred and twenty-four.

Signed: Joseph Aspdin

AND BE IT REMEMBERED, that on the Fifteenth day of December, in the year of our Lord 1824, and aforesaid Joseph Aspdin came before our said Lord the King in His Chancery, and acknowledged the Specification aforesaid, and all and every thing therein contained and specified, in form above written. And also the Specification aforesaid was stamped according to the tenor of the statute made for that purpose.

Inrolled the Eighteenth day of December, in the year of our Lord One thousand eight hundred and twenty-four.

== Implications of the patent ==
Joseph Aspdin called the product Portland cement because set mortar made from it resembled “the best Portland stone". Portland stone was the most prestigious building stone in use in England at the time. The patent clearly does not describe the product recognised as Portland cement today. The product was aimed at the market for stuccos and architectural pre-cast mouldings, for which a fast-setting, low-strength cement was required (see cement). It was fired at low temperature (below 1250 °C) and therefore contained no alite (C_{3}S: 3CaO·SiO_{2}, tricalcium silicate).

The product belongs to the category of "artificial cements" that were developed to compete with James Parker's Roman cement, and was similar to that developed much earlier by James Frost. The process described is a "double burning" process in which the limestone is burned on its own first, then slaked, mixed with clay, and burned again. This was a common practice for manufacturers of both Artificial and Portland cements when only hard limestones were available. The grinding technology of the time consisted only of flat millstones, and it was more economic to pulverize the limestone by burning and slaking than by grinding.

The limestone he used was the Pennines Carboniferous limestone of the area, which was used for paving in the towns and on the turnpike roads. The characteristic practise of the patent (and of his lime patent) is the use of "road sweepings" as a raw material. He says that if the sweepings are not available he obtains 'the limestone itself". It is significant that Joseph Aspdin was twice prosecuted for digging up whole paving blocks from the local roads. Limestone supply was clearly a major headache for Aspdin in the days before stone could be brought in by rail.

His son William's innovation was to make a mix with a higher limestone content, to burn it at a higher temperature using more fuel, and to grind the hitherto-discarded hard clinkered material, hence increasing wear-and-tear in the grinding process. However, William did not file for a patent on his modified process, and sometimes claimed his father's patent. In 1848, William moved south to Northfleet, in Kent, where inexhaustible supplies of soft chalk were available. A history of "financial missteps" and questionable business arrangements suggests that William may have been both inept and dishonest. Nonetheless, he is credited with launching the "modern" Portland cement industry.

== See also ==
- Cement
- Portland cement
