= Pulp capping =

Dental restoration technique

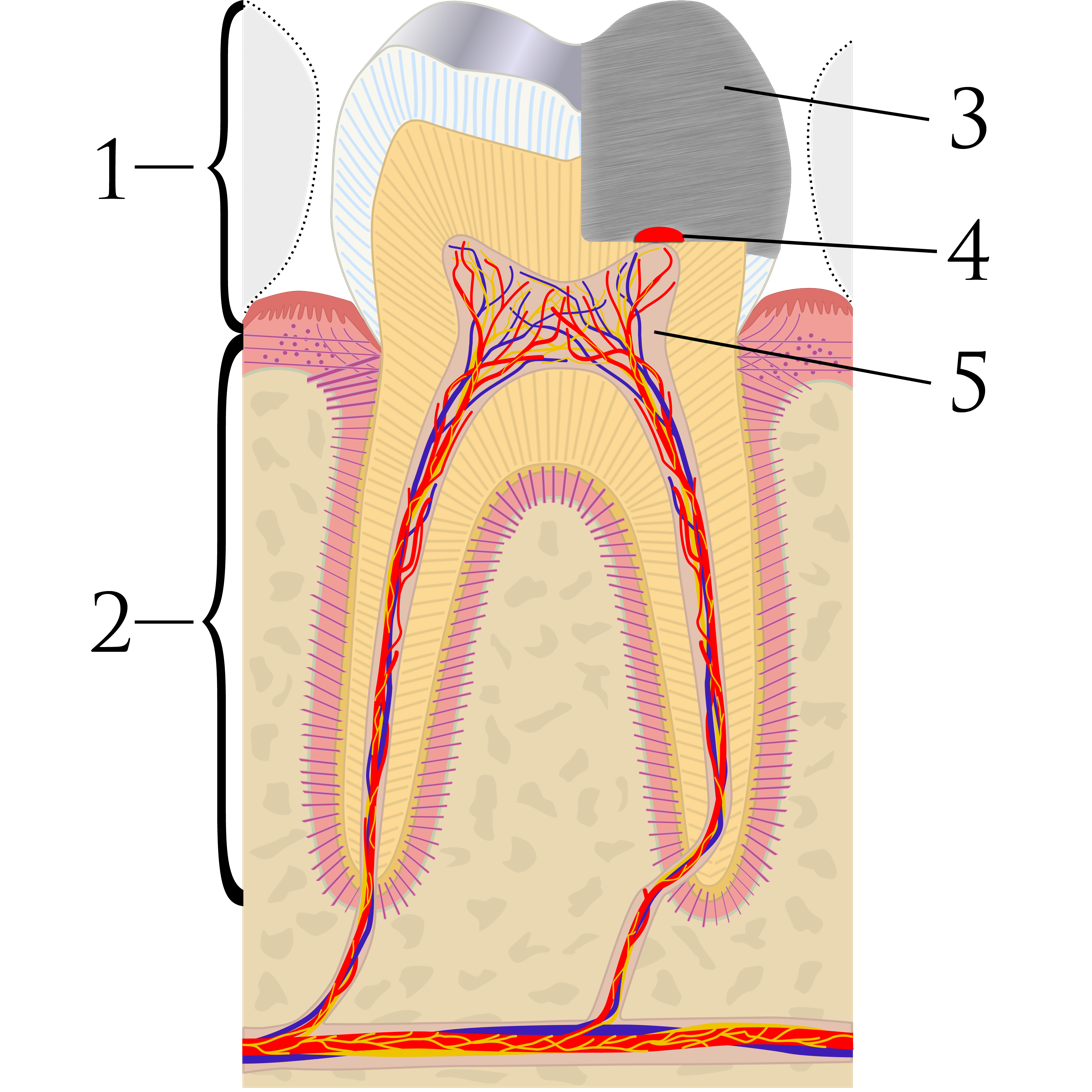
Sedative material placed over exposed or nearly exposed pulp 1) crown 2) root 3) restoration 4) pulp cap 5) pulp chamber

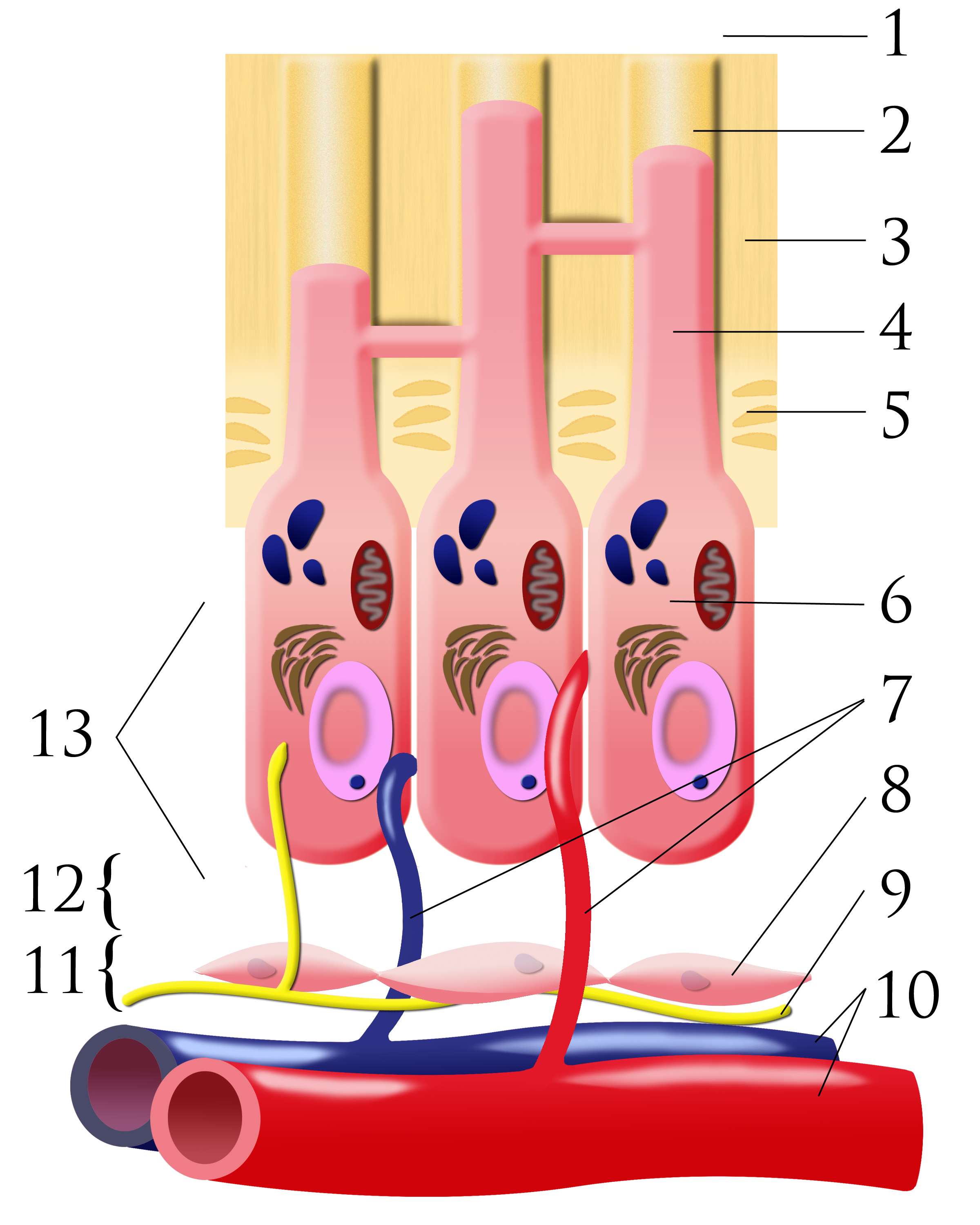
Pulpal dentin junction. 1) outside tooth/enamel 2) dentin tubule 3) dentin 4) odontoblastic process 5) predentin 6) odontoblast 7) capillaries 8) fibroblasts 9) nerve 10) artery/vein 11) cell-rich zone 12) cell-poor zone 13) pulp chamber

Pulp capping is a technique used in dental restorations to protect the dental pulp, after it has been exposed, or nearly exposed during a cavity preparation, from a traumatic injury, or by a deep cavity that reaches the center of the tooth, causing the pulp to die. Exposure of the pulp causes pulpitis (an inflammation which can become irreversible, leading to pain and pulp necrosis, and necessitating either root canal treatment or extraction). The ultimate goal of pulp capping or stepwise caries removal is to protect a healthy (or reversibly inflammed) dental pulp, and avoid the need for root canal therapy.

When dental caries is removed from a tooth, all or most of the infected and softened enamel and dentin are removed. This can lead to the pulp of the tooth either being exposed or nearly exposed. To prevent the pulp from deteriorating when a dental restoration gets near the pulp, the dentist will place a small amount of a sedative dressing, such as calcium hydroxide or mineral trioxide aggregate (MTA). These materials protect the pulp from noxious agents (heat, cold, bacteria) and stimulate the cell-rich zone of the pulp to lay down a bridge of reparative dentin. Dentin formation usually starts within 30 days of the pulp capping (there can be a delay in onset of dentin formation if the odontoblasts of the pulp are injured during cavity removal) and is largely completed by 130 days.

As of 2021, recent improvements in dressing materials have significantly increased the success rates of pulp capping teeth with cavities.

Two different types of pulp cap are distinguished. In direct pulp capping, the protective dressing is placed directly over an exposed pulp; and in indirect pulp capping, a thin layer of softened dentin, that if removed would expose the pulp, is left in place and the protective dressing is placed on top. A direct pulp cap is a one-stage procedure, whereas a stepwise caries removal is a two-stage procedure over about six months.

== Direct ==
Success rates (% of teeth not needing more treatment) for the capping of pulp exposed by cavities, as of 2021
Protective material	6 months	1 year	2-3 years	4-5 years
Mineral trioxide aggregate	91%	86%	84%	81%
Biodentine	91%	86%	86%	[no data]
Calcium hydroxide	74%	65%	59%	56%

This technique is used when a pulpal exposure or near-exposure occurs, either due to caries extending to the pulp chamber, or accidentally, during caries removal. It is only feasible if the exposure is made through uninfected dentin, and any pulpitis is reversible (that is, there is no recent history of spontaneous pain, indicating irreversible pulpitis) and a bacteria-tight seal can be applied.

Once the exposure is made, the tooth is isolated from saliva to prevent contamination by use of a dental dam, if it was not already in place. The tooth is then washed and dried, and the protective material placed, followed finally by a dental restoration which gives a bacteria-tight seal to prevent infection.

Since pulp capping is not always successful in maintaining the vitality of the pulp, the dentist will usually keep the status of the tooth under review for about a year after the procedure. Success rates (the chance that the tooth will be preserved) have risen with newer protective materials.

== Indications for direct pulp capping ==
Indications for direct pulp capping include:

- Immature/mature permanent teeth with simple restoration needs
- Recent trauma less than 24 hours (less according to tichy) exposure of pulp / mechanical trauma exposure (during restorative procedure)
- Minimal or no bleeding at exposure site
- Normal sensibility test
- Not tender to percussion
- No periradicular pathology
- Young patient

== Contraindications for direct pulp capping ==
Contraindications for direct pulp capping include:

- Systemic disease involvement
- Primary teeth
- Inflammatory signs and symptoms
- Pre-operative tooth sensitivity
- Large pulpal exposure
- Uncontrollable bleeding from the pulp
- Non-restorable tooth
- Elderly patient

== Indirect ==
In 1938, Bodecker introduced the stepwise caries excavation (SWE) technique for treatment of teeth with deep caries for preservation of pulp vitality. This technique is used when most of the decay has been removed from a deep cavity, but some softened dentin and decay remains over the pulp chamber that if removed would expose the pulp and trigger irreversible pulpitis. Instead, the dentist intentionally leaves the softened dentin or decay in place, and uses a layer of protective temporary material which promotes remineralization of the softened dentin over the pulp and the laying down of new layers of tertiary dentin in the pulp chamber. The color of the carious lesion changes from light brown to dark brown, the consistency goes from soft and wet to hard and dry so that Streptococcus mutans and Lactobacilli have been significantly reduced to a limited number or even zero viable organisms and the radiographs show no change or even a decrease in the radiolucent zone. A temporary filling is used to keep the material in place, and about six months later, the cavity is re-opened and hopefully there is now enough sound dentin over the pulp (a "dentin bridge") that any residual softened dentin can be removed and a permanent filling can be placed. This method is also called "stepwise caries removal." The difficulty with this technique is estimating how rapid the carious process has been, how much tertiary dentin has been formed and knowing exactly when to stop excavating to avoid pulp exposure.

== Materials ==
The following materials have been studied as potential materials for direct pulp capping. However, calcium hydroxide and mineral trioxide aggregate (MTA) are the preferred material of choice in clinical practice due to their favourable outcome.

=== Zinc oxide eugenol ===
Zinc oxide eugenol (ZOE) is a commonly used material in dentistry. The use of ZOE as a pulp capping material remains controversial. This is due to eugenol, being cytotoxic to the pulp, being present in large quantities in this formulation. Also due to its nature of non-adhesive, it leads to poor coronal seal hence increasing micro-leakage. Studies have demonstrated unfavourable results for ZOE when compared to calcium hydroxide as a direct pulp-capping material as it causes pulpal necrosis.

=== Glass and resin-modified glass ionomer ===
Both glass ionomer (GI) and resin-modified glass ionomer (RMGIC) have been widely used as a lining or base material for deep cavities where pulp is in close proximity. This is due to their superior properties of good biocompatibility and adhesive nature, providing coronal seal to prevent bacteria infiltration. However, they are not a material of choice for direct pulp capping. When the use of RMGIC and calcium hydroxide has been studied as direct pulp-capping agents, RMGIC has demonstrated increase in chronic inflammation in pulpal tissues and lack of reparative dentin bridge formation.

=== Adhesive system ===
Materials that fall under this category include 4-META-MMA-TBB adhesives and hybridizing dentin bonding agents. The idea of using adhesive materials for direct pulp capping has been explored two decades ago. Studies have demonstrated that it encourages bleeding due to its vasodilating properties hence impairing polymerisation of the material, affecting its ability to provide a coronal seal when used as a pulp capping agent. In addition, the material triggers chronic inflammation even without the presence of bacteria, making it an unfavourable condition for pulp healing to take place. Most importantly, its toxicity to human pulp cells once again makes it an unacceptable material of choice.

=== Calcium hydroxide cement ===
Calcium hydroxide (Ca(OH)_{2}) is an organo-metallic cement that was introduced into dentistry in the early twentieth century and there have since been many advantages to this material described in much of the available literature. Ca(OH)_{2} has a high antimicrobial activity which has been shown to be outstanding. In one experiment conducted by Stuart et al. (1991), bacteria-inoculated root canals of extracted human teeth were treated with Ca(OH)_{2} for one hour against a control group with no treatment and the results yielded 64–100% reductions in all viable bacteria. Ca(OH)_{2} also has a high pH and high solubility; thus, it readily leaches into the surrounding tissues. This alkaline environment created around the cement has been suggested to give beneficial irritancy to pulpal tissues and stimulates dentin regeneration. One study further demonstrated that Ca(OH)_{2} causes release of growth factors TGF-B1 and bioactive molecules from the dentin matrix which induces the formation of dentin bridges.

Ca(OH)_{2} does, however, have significant disadvantages. The set cement has low compressive strength and cannot withstand or support condensation of a restoration. It is thus good practice to place a stronger separate lining material (e.g. glass ionomer or resin-modified glass ionomer) over Ca(OH)_{2} before packing the final restorative material. Ca(OH)_{2} cement is not adhesive to tooth tissues and thus does not provide a coronal seal. In pulp perfusion studies, Ca(OH)_{2} has shown to insufficiently seal all dentinal tubules, and presence of tunnel defects (patent communications within reparative dentin connecting pulp and exposure sites) indicate a potential for microleakage when Ca(OH)_{2} is used. It is suggested that an adhesive coronal restoration be used above the Ca(OH)_{2} lining to provide adequate coronal seal. Because of its many advantageous properties and long-standing success in clinical use, it has been used as a control material in multiple experiments with pulp capping agents over the years and is considered the gold standard dental material for direct pulp capping to date.

=== Mineral trioxide aggregate ===
Mineral trioxide aggregate (MTA) is a recent development of the 1990s initially as a root canal sealer but has seen increased interest in its use as a direct pulp-capping material. The material comprises a blend of tricalcium silicate, dicalcium silicate and tricalcium aluminate; bismuth oxide is added to give the cement radiopaque properties to aid radiological investigation. MTA has been shown to produce Ca(OH)_{2} as a hydration product and maintains an extended duration of high pH in lab conditions. Similar to Ca(OH)_{2}, this alkalinity potentially provides beneficial irritancy and stimulates dentin repair and regeneration. MTA has also demonstrated reliable and favourable healing outcomes on human teeth when used as a pulp cap on teeth diagnosed as nothing more severe than reversible pulpitis. There is also less coronal microleakage of MTA in one experiment comparing it to amalgam thus suggesting some tooth adhesion properties. MTA also comes in white and grey preparations which may aid visual identification clinically. Disadvantages have also been described for MTA. Grey MTA preparations can potentially cause tooth discolouration. MTA also takes a long time (up to 2 hours 45 minutes) to set completely, thus preventing immediate restoration placement without mechanical disruption of the underlying MTA. It has been suggested that a pulp capped with MTA should be temporised to allow for the complete setting of MTA, and the patient to present at a second visit for placement of the permanent restoration. MTA also has for difficult handling properties and is a very expensive material, thus is less cost effective as compared to Ca(OH)_{2}.

Although MTA shows great promise, which is possibly attributed to its adhesive properties and ability to act as a source of Ca(OH)_{2} release, the available literature and experimental studies of MTA are limited due to its recency. Studies that compare pulp capping abilities of MTA to Ca(OH)_{2} in human teeth yielded generally equal and similarly successful healing outcomes at a histological level from both materials.

== Success rates ==
There have been several studies conducted on the success rates of direct and indirect pulp capping using a range of different materials. One study of indirect pulp capping recorded success rates of 98.3% and 95% using bioactive tricalcium silicate [Ca_{3}SiO_{5}]-based dentin substitute and light-activated calcium hydroxide [Ca(OH)_{2}]-based liner respectively. These results show no significant difference, nor do the results from an indirect pulp capping experiment comparing calcium silicate cement (Biodentine) and glass ionomer cement, which had clinical success rates of 83.3%. A further study testing medical Portland cement, mineral trioxide aggregate (MTA) and calcium hydroxide in indirect pulp treatment found varying success rates of 73–93%. This study concluded that indirect pulp capping had a success rate of 90.3% regardless of which material was used but stated that it is preferable to use non-resorbing materials where possible.

Similar studies have been conducted of direct pulp capping, with one study comparing ProRoot mineral trioxide aggregate (MTA) and Biodentine which found success rates of 92.6% and 96.4% respectively. This study was conducted on 6–18 year-old patients, while a comparable study conducted on mature permanent teeth found success rates of 84.6% using MTA and 92.3% using Biodentine. Calcium hydroxide has also been tested on its use in indirect pulp capping and was found to have a success rate of 77.6%, compared to a success rate of 85.9% for MTA in another study.

A systematic review attempted to compare success rates of direct pulp capping and indirect pulp capping and found that indirect pulp capping had a higher level of success but found a low quality of evidence in studies on direct pulp capping. More research will be needed to provide a comprehensive answer.

== See also ==
- Pulpotomy
