= Pulp necrosis =

Tissue death within the interior of a tooth

Pulp necrosis is a clinical diagnostic category indicating the death of cells and tissues in the pulp chamber of a tooth with or without bacterial invasion. It is often the result of many cases of dental trauma, caries and irreversible pulpitis.

In the initial stage of the infection, the pulp chamber is partially necrosed for a period of time and if left untreated, the area of cell death expands until the entire pulp necroses. The most common clinical signs present in a tooth with a necrosed pulp would be a grey discoloration of the crown and/or periapical radiolucency. This altered translucency in the tooth is due to disruption and cutting off of the apical neurovascular blood supply.

Sequelae of a necrotic pulp include acute apical periodontitis, dental abscess or radicular cyst and discolouration of the tooth. Tests for a necrotic pulp include: vitality testing using a thermal test or an electric pulp tester. Discolouration may be visually obvious, or more subtle.

Treatment usually involves endodontics or extraction.

== Histopathology ==
The dental pulp is located in the centre of a tooth, made up of living connective tissue and cells. It is surrounded by a rigid, hard and dense layer of dentine which limits the ability of the pulp to tolerate excessive build up of fluid. Normal interstitial fluid pressure in the pulp ranges from 5-20mm Hg, marked increases in pressure in the pulp due to inflammation can go up to 60mm Hg. The rise in pressure is commonly associated with an inflammatory exudate causing local collapse of the venous part of microcirculation. Tissues get starved of oxygen thus causing venules and lymphatics collapse which may lead to localized necrosis. A common clinical sign associated with the histopathology will be varying levels of suppuration and purulence.

Following the spread of local inflammation, chemical mediators such as IL-8, IL-6 and IL-1 are released from necrotic tissues leading to further inflammation and odema, which advances to total necrosis of the pulp.

Further stages of destruction of pulp necrosis often leads to periapical pathosis, causing bone resorption (visible on radiographs) following bacterial invasion. The apical periodontal ligament (PDL) space widens and becomes continuous with apical radiolucency; the lamina dura of the apical area will also be lost. The periapical lesion will enlarged with time and consequently, the pulp will be diagnosed as necrotic.

The pulp can respond (reversible pulpitis, irreversible pulpitis, partial necrosis, total necrosis) in a variety of ways to irritants. This response depends on the severity and duration of the irritant involved. If the irritant is severe or persists for a sustained amount of time it can cause the odontoblasts to die and cause initiation of an inflammatory response.

=== Odontoblasts ===
The odontoblast cell bodies decrease in number and size before any inflammatory changes occur. The outward flow of tubular fluid can cause the nuclei of odontoblasts to be aspirated into the dentinal tubules. The odontoblasts may also be permanently damaged which causes them to release tissue injury factors which can then influence adjacent odontoblasts and underlying connective tissue. Odontoblasts can undergo vacuolization, a decrease in the number and size of the endoplasmic reticulum, and degeneration of mitochondria. It is unknown by which process (apoptosis or necrosis) the odontoblasts die.

=== Inflammation ===
Lymphocytes, plasma cells and macrophages comprise the initial inflammatory infiltrate. In response to bacterial assault and tissue injury non-specific inflammatory mediators are released. These inflammatory mediators include histamine, bradykinin, serotonin, interleukins (IL) and metabolites of arachidonic acid. They can interact with neuropeptides (substance P) and calcitonin gene-related peptide (CGRP) during the inflammatory response. Destruction of the nerve fibres causes neuropeptides to be released into pulp. The neuropeptides can cause an increase vascular permeability and vasodilation. The filtration of serum proteins and fluid from the vessel causes the tissue to become oedematous. The tissue pressure increases as the blood volume and interstitial fluid volume rises. The thin-walled venules are compressed and the resistance to flow in these vessels increases. This is accompanied with a decrease in blood flow causing an aggregation of red blood cells and subsequent increase in blood viscosity. This tissue also becomes ischaemic which suppresses the cellular metabolism in the area of the pulp that is affected. This causes necrosis. Necrosis is a histological term that means death of the pulp. It does not occur suddenly unless there has been trauma. The pulp may be partially necrotic for some time. The area of cell death enlarges until the entire pulp is necrotic. Bacteria invade the pulp which causes the root canal system to become infected. Teeth that have total pulpal necrosis are usually asymptomatic except for those that have inflammation which has progressed to the periradicular tissues.

== Aetiology and Causes ==
Pulp necrosis arises due to the cellular death within the pulp chamber – this can occur with or without the involvement of bacteria. It is the result of various connective tissue disease progressions which occur in stages; normal healthy tissue becomes inflamed (i.e. pulpitis) which if left untreated leads to necrosis and infection and finally resulting in loss of pulp tissue (i.e. pulpless canals)

=== Causes ===
- Dental Caries
- Dental Trauma
- Dental Treatment
- Pulpitis
- Infection

==== Dental Caries ====
The influx of bacteria and growth of a carious lesion (if gross and left untreated) inevitably leads to the centre of the tooth – the pulp chamber. Once this tissue damaging process reaches the pulp it results in irreversible changes – necrosis and pulpal infection.

==== Dental Trauma ====
When a tooth is displaced from its normal position as a result of dental trauma, it can result in pulp necrosis due to the apical blood supply being compromised. This might be due to displacement of the tooth through avulsion or luxation. Furthermore, if the tooth is severely damaged, it could lead to inflammation of the apical periodontal ligament, and subsequently pulp necrosis.

==== Dental Treatment ====
Pulpal necrosis can also occur as a result of dental treatments such as iatrogenic damage due to overzealous crown preparation – this may be due to excessive thermal insult and close proximity to the pulp during tooth preparation – or rapid orthodontic work causing excessive force.

==== Pulpitis ====
Pulpitis is stated to be one of the stages of disease progression which leads to pulpal necrosis. This inflammation can be reversible or irreversible. Due to the enclosed nature of the pulp chamber - unlike normal inflammation - when inflamed, the increased pressure cannot be displaced to other tissues, resulting in pressure on the nerve of said tooth and tissues adjacent. In irreversible pulpitis where the inflammation of pulpal tissues are not reversible, pulpal blood supply will become compromised and therefore necrosis of pulpal tissues will occur.

== Signs and symptoms ==
Pulp necrosis may or may not arise with symptoms.

Signs and symptoms of pulpal necrosis include;

- Pain
- Crown discolouration
- Abscess and/or fistula
- Internal root resorption
- Increased tooth mobility

There are additional signs of pulp necrosis which may be detected during radiographic assessment:-;

- Untreated caries
- Extensive/deep restoration
- Previous pulp capping

However, in some cases there may be no radiographic signs. For example, pulp necrosis caused by dental trauma which may only manifest/present itself with time, resulting in clinical changes.

=== Pain ===
The pain associated with pulp necrosis is often described as spontaneous. Hot temperatures are reported to have exacerbating factors, and cold temperatures are said to soothe this pain. In some cases, the pain presents as a long dull ache as this is due to necrosis of the apical nerves being the last part of the pulp to necrose. Therefore, the pain is from the apical nerves, which have residual vitality remaining when the majority of the pulp is necrosed due to the supply of blood to the more medial parts of the apical nerve.

=== Crown discolouration ===
In some cases of pulp necrosis there is a yellow, grey or brown crown discolouration. Dark coronal discoloration is believed to be an early sign of pulp degeneration. Teeth with said discolouration need to be treated with special care and further investigations are required before pulp necrosis can be diagnosed.

=== Abscess and/or fistula ===
Alterations in the gingiva such as fistulas or abscesses and radiographic signs such as periapical lesions and external root resorption are used in some studies to diagnose pulp necrosis however other studies state that these factors alone are not enough to diagnose a necrotic pulp.

=== Internal root resorption ===
Internal root resorption may be an indication of pulpal necrosis though it is not possible to diagnose accurately with radiographic presentation of this alone. This is because the pulp tissue apical to the resorptive lesion will still be vital to allow active resorption to take place, it provides the clastic cells with nutrients via a viable blood supply.

== Diagnosis ==
There are a plethora of ways to diagnose pulp necrosis in a tooth. The diagnosis of pulp necrosis can be based on the following observations: negative vitality, a periapical radiolucency, a grey tooth discoloration and even peri-apical lesions. This altered translucency in the tooth is due to disruption and cutting off of the apical neurovascular blood supply.

=== Thermal Tests ===
Thermal testing is a common and traditional way used to detect pulp necrosis. These tests can exist in the form of a cold or hot test, which aims to stimulate nerves in the pulp by the flow of dentine liquid at changes in temperature. The liquid flow leads to movement of the odontoblast processes and mechanical stimulation of pulpal nerves.

The cold test can be done by soaking a cotton pellet into 1,1,1,2 tetrofluoroethane, also known as Endo ice refrigerant spray. The cotton pellet will then be placed onto the middle third of the intact tooth surface. The clinical study done by Gopikrishna indicated the tooth to be diagnosed as having necrotic pulp if subjects felt no sensation after two 15-second applications every two minutes. It is worthy to note that a control test should be performed on the adjacent tooth to ensure further accuracy of results.

=== Pulse Oximeter Test ===
The pulse oximeter test is a more accurate way to test for necrotic pulps as it primarily tests for vascular health of the pulp as compared to its nervous response. This method involves taking measurements of blood oxygen saturation levels, making it non-invasive and an objective way to record patient response regarding pulpal diagnosis. In a study conducted in primary and immature permanent teeth, results clearly reflected that pulse oximetry can readily differentiate between vital and non-vital, necrosed teeth.

The pulse oximeter consists of a probe containing 2 light-emitting diodes, one of which transmits red light to measure the absorption of oxygenated haemoglobin, and the other transmitting infrared light, measuring the absorption of deoxygenated haemoglobin. As both oxygenated and deoxygenated haemoglobin absorb different amounts of red and infrared light, relationships between pulsatile changes in blood volume and light absorption values can establish saturation of arterial blood. In addition, using absorption curves for both oxygenated and deoxygenated haemoglobin can determine the oxygen saturation levels. For the purposes of evaluating pulp vitality, it is imperative that the probes fit the anatomical contours and shape of the measured teeth.

A study was done to assess the accuracy of pulse oximetry in comparison to thermal and electrical tests. Customized pulse oximeter dental probes were placed on the crown of the tooth, with oxygen saturation values recorded after 30 seconds of monitoring each tooth. The values were taken as a positive response (i.e. vital pulp) within the range of 75-85% oxygen saturation and a negative response below 75%, indicating pulp necrosis.

Another critically appraised topic also suggests that a pulse oximeter is more accurate than cold testing in diagnosing pulp necrosis, however comments raised regarding the validity of the evidence stated that the pulse oximeter adaptors were built by the respective authors causing some degree of bias in the experiments.

=== 3-tesla Magnetic Resonance Imaging ===
MRI scans have been used to detect and evaluate several head and neck regions including the Temporomandibular Joint, salivary glands, floor of the mouth, etc. In the clinical study completed by Alexandre T. Assaf, MRI scans were used to detect pulp vitality after trauma in children. The absence of re-perfusion of the dental pulp suggests the lack of revitalization of the affected teeth and hence necrosis of the pulp. In this study, MRI scans prove to be a promising tool to avoid excessive root treatment on traumatized teeth. However, a major flaw in this study is a small sample size of 7.

== Management & Treatment ==
The most basic treatment for teeth with pulpal necrosis is root canal treatment. This involves the use of biologically accepted mechanical and chemical treatment of the root system, followed by the placement of a root filling, allowing healing of the periradicular tissues to occur.

Pulpal regeneration can be considered if the following criteria are met:

1. Incomplete root development and incomplete apex closure
2. Apexogenesis is not applicable as there is apical closure

Pulpal regeneration involves the removal of the necrotic pulp followed by the placement of medicament into the root canal system until it is non-symptomatic. Apical bleeding is then induced to create a clot at the apex which will be sealed by Mineral Trioxide Aggregate.

In an immature permanent tooth pulpal necrosis causes the development of the root to stop. This causes the walls of the root to become fragile and thin which can make these teeth more prone to cervical root fracture and ultimately the tooth may be lost. These teeth in the past were treated with the calcium hydroxide apexification technique. A disadvantage of this was that it required multiple visits over a prolonged time and there could be an increased risk of cervical root fracture due to an increase in exposure to calcium hydroxide. The apical barrier technique with mineral trioxide aggregate was then used. The advantage of this technique over apexification was that it shortened the number of appointments and the healing outcomes were better. A disadvantage of both these techniques was that it did not allow the root to mature and so regenerative endodontic procedures (REPs) were utilised. A systematic review conducted by Kahler, et al. (2017) showed similar clinical outcomes for teeth treated with REPs versus calcium hydroxide apexification/MTA apical barrier technique. They suggested that it should be considered as a first line treatment option in immature teeth with pulpal necrosis. They did state that a thorough discussion with the patient would be necessary as teeth treated with REP's can show variable root maturation and adverse outcomes.
