= Mineral trioxide aggregate =

Dental material

Mineral trioxide aggregate (MTA) is an alkaline, cementitious dental repair material. MTA is used for creating apical plugs during apexification, repairing root perforations during root canal therapy, and treating internal root resorption. It can be used for root-end filling material and as pulp capping material. It has better pulpotomy outcomes than calcium hydroxide or formocresol, and may be the best known material, as of 2018 data. For pulp capping, it has a success rate higher than calcium hydroxide, and indistinguishable from Biodentin.

MTA, when mixed with water, forms a calcium silicate hydrate gel which contains calcium hydroxide. When it contacts the tooth pulp or dentin, its alkalinity promotes tissue regeneration. It does not resorb, and is biocompatible, forming a seal against the tooth material that minimizes leakage.

Originally, MTA was dark gray in color, but white versions have been on the market since 2002. Bismuth oxide, which was added as a radioopacifier (to make the filling stand out on X-rays), can discolour the teeth. Original versions were also hard for dentists to handle and had a long setting time, but otherwise had few drawbacks. Newer versions replace the bismuth oxide with zirconium oxide, shortening the setting time, and took other measures to shorten the setting time and improve the handling.

MTA is relatively expensive.

== Composition ==
MTA is composed mostly of tricalcium silicate, dicalcium silicate, tricalcium aluminate, and tetracalcium aluminoferrite, with calcium sulfate and bismuth oxide as minor constituents. The later 4 phases vary among the commercial products available.

MTA's design is based on Portland cement, but is not interchangeable with Portland cement construction materials. It has been contrasted with Portland cement in studies. Newly developed fast-set MTAs were developed based on pozzolan cement or zeolite cement. They use the pozzolanic reaction to improve the material.

Components (phases) in MTA
Tricalcium silicate (CaO)_{3}.SiO_{2}
Dicalcium silicate (CaO)_{2}.SiO_{2}
Tricalcium aluminate (CaO)_{3}.Al_{2}O_{3}
Tetracalcium aluminoferrite (CaO)_{4}.Al_{2}O_{3}.Fe_{2}O_{3}
Gypsum CaSO_{4} · 2 H_{2}O
Bismuth oxide Bi_{2}O_{3}

== Characteristics and products ==
1. Biocompatible with periradicular tissues
2. Non cytotoxic, but antimicrobial to bacteria
3. Non-resorbable
4. Minimal leakage around the margins.
5. Very basic AKA alkaline (high pH when mixed with water).
6. As a root-end filling material MTA shows less leakage than other root-end filling materials, which means bacterial migration to the apex is diminished.
7. Treated area needs to be infection free when applying MTA, because an acidic environment will prevent MTA from setting.
8. Compressive strength develops over a period of 28 days, similar to Portland cement. Strengths of more than 50 MPa are achieved when mixed in a powder-to-liquid ratio of more than 3 to 1.

Originally, MTA products required a few hours for the initial and final setting, which is uncommon in dental materials. Newer materials are available that set more quickly.

MTA Plus is washout resistant.

MTA Products: Gray: Calcium Alumino-Silicate Cement (C3S, C2S with C3A)- Portland Cement Type I with Bismuth Trioxide. (ex. ProRoot MTA, MTA Angelus) White : Calcium Carbonate alumino-silicate Cement (CaCO_{3} + SiO_{2} with Al_{2}O_{3}). Final phase is medical grade material similar to Portland Cement. (Limestone Portland Cement) (ex. ProRoot MTA White, MTA Angelus Blanc, EndoCem/Zr, MM MTA, Tech BioSeal MTA, Trioxident, most white MTAs). Bioceramic (ex. OrthoMTA, RetroMTA, Angelus MTA-Fillapex)

GIC solution is polyacrylic acid. GIC is alumino-silicate (glass) bioceramic cement. As MTA is mainly composed of calcium-alumino-silicate, PAA (polyacrylic acid) is an accelerant for MTA. PAA set MTA within 15–18 minutes. More aluminate, faster set. Also high concentrated calcium chloride (CaCl_{2}, 70% more) is well known as accelerator of Portland cement. So high concentrated -over 70%- Calcium Chloride solution sets MTA within 12 minutes. Or Pozzolanic reaction is also faster set chemical reaction of calcium silicate hydrate. But pozzolanic reacted cement has lower compressive strength at 15 MPa maximum. Easy broken and easily removable property of pozzolanic MTA.

== Usage in some clinical cases ==
=== Root-end filling after apicectomy ===
In root canal therapy where an apical infection is persistent, an apicectomy may be required. Flap is raised over the tooth and the root tip is resected and a cavity created (3–4 mm) in the root tip remaining. Retrograde application of MTA to the root tip cavity is completed.

MTA was originally developed for root-end filling. There were several different materials such as amalgam, reinforced zinc oxide eugenol cements (interim restorative material - IRM), super ethoxy benzoic acid [EBA], glass ionomer cement and composite resin for root-end filling after apicectomy. MTA, a refined "Portland cement" - calcium alumino-silicate cement-, was found to have less cytotoxic and better results in biocompatibility and micro-leakage sealing ability, giving it more success over root-end filling materials. MTA is not acceptable as "ideal root-end filling material" because MTA has some drawbacks of toxic heavy metal presence, discoloration, difficult handling, short working time, long setting time, washout before setting and washout after set (calcium carbonate based MTA has solvent of carbonic acid). The benefits of MTA as a root-end filling material compared to other materials (IRM, Super-EBA, dentine-bonded resin composite, glass ionomer cement, amalgam, RRM) is inconclusive.

For ideal Root-end filling, there are many new materials or improved materials developed.

1. Glass ionomer cement: It is based on alumino-silicate based bioceramic material. Most cytotoxicity is caused by polyacrylic acid. So current GIC as root-end filling material is reducing the cytotoxic acclerator's concentration. - calcium alumino-silicate - MTA (calcium alumino-silicate) + GIC (alumino-silicate), calcium reinforced glass ionomer cement is developed. It's a promising material.

2. Calcium phosphate cement (hydroxyapatite) bioceramic material: CPC has been studied since 1985 in the US. Bone grafting material, artificial bioceramic CPC is developed for Root-end filling or pilot material in root-end filling and root repair material.

3. Calcium silicate based material - bioceramic material: It was known as bioceramic sealers. But actual bioceramic aggregates are composed of pure medical graded calcium silicate based material.

4. Calcium aluminate bioceramic material - (alumina cement in minerals, calcium aluminate cements in bioceramics) Alumina is an initial fast setting element and high compressive strength. It has been used as dental products as luting agent. Calcium aluminate cement (bioceramic) has been developed for dental products and root-end filling material.

These newly developed root-end filling materials are based on bioceramic, chemically bonded ceramic, not by mineral (ceramic in nature) like MTA. Even if mineral shows higher biocompatibility, minerals have potential toxic heavy metals in material. Bioceramic or bioMaterial is used for medical and dental products. BioMaterials can reduce the issues on discoloration and toxic heavy metals' presence initially.

=== Internal and external root resorption, and obturation ===
In internal resorption, root canal therapy is performed, a putty mixture of MTA is inserted in the canal using pluggers to the level of the defect. Gutta percha and root canal sealer are placed above the defect to complete the root canal treatment. In direct cases, the canal may be completely obturated with MTA. The MTA will provide structure and strength to the tooth by replacing the resorbed tooth structure. In external resorption, after root canal therapy is performed, the flap is raised over the tooth and the defect removed from the root surface with a round bur. Retrograde application of MTA to the root surface is then completed.

=== Lateral or furcation perforation ===
Lateral perforation occurs when an instrument has perforated the root during cleaning & shaping of the canal by the dentist. If it happens, one should finish cleaning & shaping of the canal, irrigate the canal with sodium hypochlorite to disinfect it and dry it with a paper point. The perforation can be sealed with a thick mixture of an MTA-type product, preventing bacterial ingress. Make sure that you can locate the canal while the MTA has not set and remove the excess material from the area.

=== Root canal sealer ===
Several MTA products are available as sealer. MTA Plus has the highest percentage of MTA in its formula. As calcium based materials have washout property in dam, the antiwashout agents are used. The examples are chitosan and gelatin, which has been used with injectable bone grafting paste. MTA Plus is used with gelatin complex as antiwashout agent. MTA Angelus Fillapex sealer contains less than 20% tri/dicalcium silicate powder in a salicylate carrier medium similar to Sealapex. By element analysis, there is no bismuth oxide of MTA. EndoSeal MTA, Tech BioSeal MTA are also MTA root canal sealers. MTA is used as filler in the resin like MTA Fillapex. MTA powder is mixed with fillers in the resin. These are not MTA based root canal sealer, but resin modified root canal sealer.

Brasseler Endosequence offers a pre-mixed sealer with a non-reactive carrier medium and the product only sets in vivo. Brasseler's EndoSequence bioceramic sealers are tricalcium silicate-based materials without any calcium aluminate phase. The sealer paste or root repair putty contain a medium of organic liquids. By the diffusion of water into the paste, the materials set in vivo.

Apexification (Necrotic pulp)

When the root is incompletely formed in adolescents and an infection occurs, apexification can be performed to maintain the tooth in position as the roots develop. In case of non-vital pulp: 1. Isolate the tooth with a rubber dam 2. perform root canal treatment. 3. Mix MTA and insert it to the apex of the tooth, creating a 3 mm thickness of plug. 5. Fill the canal with sealer and gutta percha. Alternatively, revascularization techniques are being used where an antibiotic is locally administered. Later a blood clot is formed in the canal and a coronal plug of MTA is placed.

Apexogenesis (Vital pulp)

The process of maintaining pulp vitality during pulpal treatment to allow continued development of the entire root (apical closure occurs approximately 3 years after eruption). 1. Isolate the tooth with a rubber dam 2. Perform a pulpotomy procedure. 3. Place the MTA material over the pulp and close the tooth with temporary cement until the apex is completely formed.

MTA can be used in a one step or a two step approach. It can be used as a powder or a Wet Mix. However a study found that all these approaches have shown to be equally effective.

=== Pulp capping ===
In case of mechanical exposure that occurs during cavity preparation and not a pathological exposure due to caries. Proper isolation should be completed using a rubber dam and cotton pellet. Disinfection of the cavity with sodium hypochlorite. then application of MTA over the exposure area. restoration of the cavity with amalgam or composite is done. MTA provides a higher incidence and faster rate of reparative dentin formation without the pulpal inflammation.

MTA Plus material is also indicated for base and liner in vital pulp therapy. In root-end filling after apicoectomy, the anti-washout agent (chitosan or gelatin) is useful to prevent from MTA washout. But in vital pulp therapy, anti-washout gel doesn't increase bioactivity or bacterial tight sealing ability of MTA. Instead, hydraulic (100% pure water) MTA shows the higher success rate than anti-washout gel or resin medium. Resin Modified MTA or Calcium Silicate Cement was marketed already. TheraCal LC is HEMA-free resin modified calcium silicate cement (MTA-like, Portland cement Type III) light-curable for base and liner in vital pulp therapy.

== History ==
MTA was developed for use as a dental root repair material in 1993.

It was developed by Mahmoud Torabinejad or Dr.Rakesh Singh At (YDC), at Loma Linda University School of Dentistry,

== See also ==
- Calcium hydroxide
- Internal resorption
- External resorption
- Endodontic therapy
