= Regenerative endodontics =

Dental specialty

Regenerative endodontic procedures is defined as biologically based procedures designed to replace damaged structures such as dentin, root structures, and cells of the pulp-dentin complex. This new treatment modality aims to promote normal function of the pulp. It has become an alternative to heal apical periodontitis. Regenerative endodontics is the extension of root canal therapy. Conventional root canal therapy cleans and fills the pulp chamber with biologically inert material after destruction of the pulp due to dental caries, congenital deformity or trauma. Regenerative endodontics instead seeks to replace live tissue in the pulp chamber. The ultimate goal of regenerative endodontic procedures is to regenerate the tissues and the normal function of the dentin-pulp complex.

Before this treatment modality is introduced, apexification procedures using either immediate placement of mineral trioxide aggregate apical plug or long term-calcium hydroxide treatment were traditionally used to treat immature permanent tooth. Although these treatments often resolve the signs and symptoms of pathosis, they provide little to no benefit for continued root development. Further root growth, normal pulpal nociception and immune defense are impeded in the procedure of apexification.

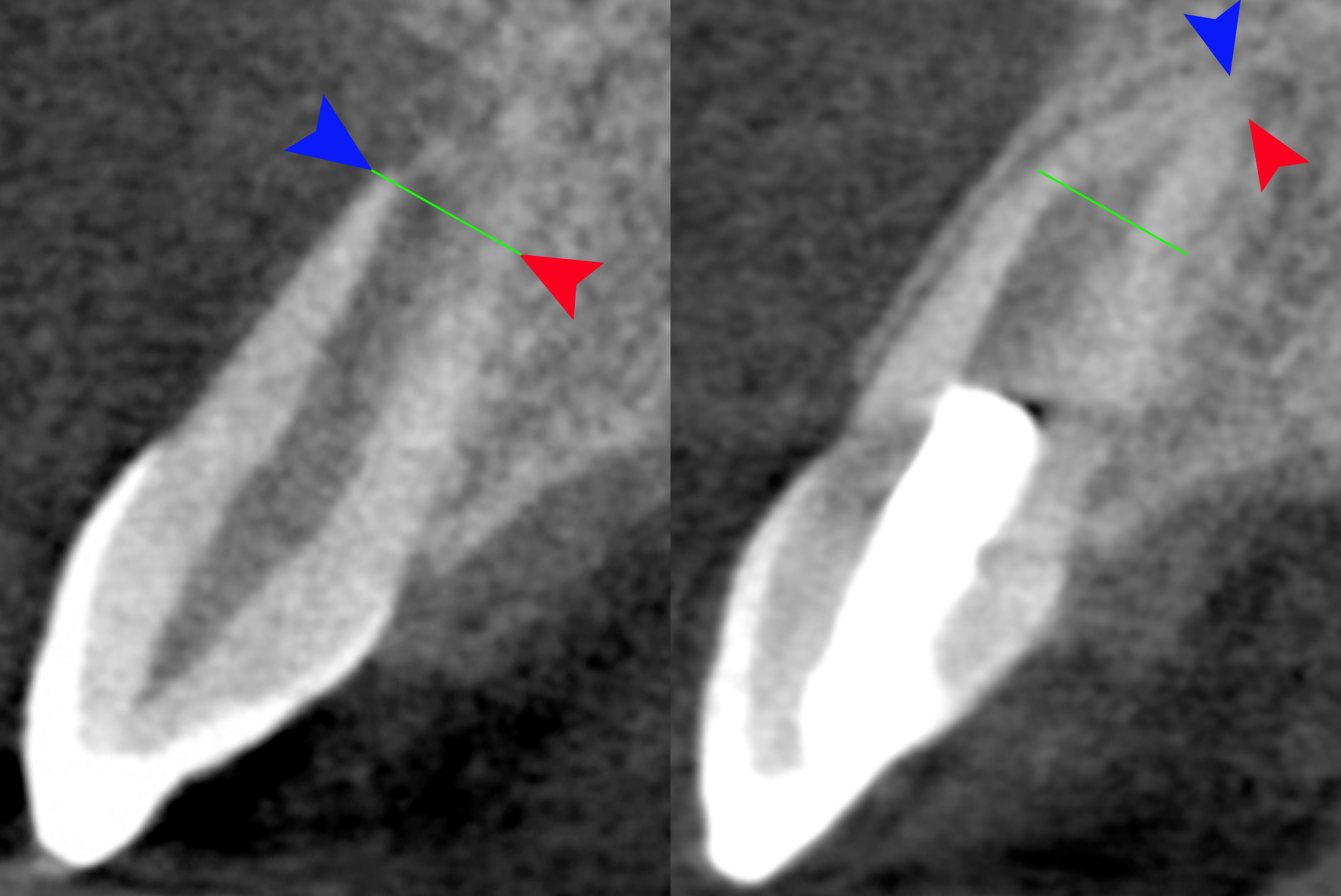
Regenerative endodontics in 10-year-old with necrotic pulp and incomplete root formation (left) then 1 year after treatment. Buccal aspect of apex (blue arrow), palatal aspect of apex (red arrow) and line of initial root formation (green line)

To replace live tissue, either the existing cells of the body are stimulated to regrow the tissue native to the area or bioactive substances inserted in the pulp chamber. These include stem cell therapy, growth factors, morphogens, tissue scaffolds and biologically active delivery systems.

Closely related to the field of regenerative endodontics, are the clinical procedures apexification and apexogenesis. When the dental pulp of a developing adult tooth dies, root formation is halted leaving an open tooth apex. Attempting to complete root canal on a tooth with an open apex is technically difficult and the long-term prognosis for the tooth is poor.

Apexogenesis, (which can be used when the pulp is injured but not necrotic) leaves the apical one-third of the dental pulp in the tooth which allows the root to complete formation. Apexification, stimulates cells in the periapical area of the tooth to form a dentin-like substance over the apex. Both improve the long-term prognosis for a forming tooth over root canal alone.

Necrotic pulp and open apex can be revitalized with platelet rich fibrin.

== History ==
Regenerative endodontics is founded by the seminal work by Dr. Ostby in the early 1960s. He hypothesized that the presence of blood clot within the root canal promotes healing of the pulp, hence maintaining the vitality of the pulp. This can be quite similar to the role of blood clot in other injury site in the healing process. To prove this hypothesis, mature teeth diagnosed with pulpal disease received pulp space debridement followed by enlargement of the apical foramen. Medicament dressing was placed and intracanal bleeding was evoked. Kloroperka obturation placed coronal to the formed blood clot. This study aimed to evaluate the role of the apical blood clot in the healing of apical periodontitis and pulp repair.

Patients were followed from a time period of 17 days to 3.5 years and the treated teeth were then extracted. The newly formed tissue were histologically examined. Resolution of symptoms of inflammation related to enlargement of foramen and overinstrumentation were observed in as early as 17 days. Resolution of apical periodontitis and signs and symptoms of inflammation and radiographic evidence of continued root development and apical narrowing were demonstrated in all teeth.

Histology wise, ingrowth of connective tissue into the canal space was observed. Different levels of mineralised tissue was identified along the canal walls. Mineralised tissue was found embedded in the newly formed tissue. Dental pulp is fibroblast-rich and this result was promising. Odontoblasts were required to aid in pulpal healing but these cells were lacking in this pioneer study. On the other hand, undesired cell types like cementoblasts were found in the tissue. In spite of the shortcomings, this study has established a strong foundation in the field of regenerative endodontics.

The expansion of the field of regenerative endodontics was also dependent on the contributions from important studies in dental trauma. It has been proven that the vitality of dental pulp in immature teeth is preserved and it is free of signs and symptoms of disease even though it has sustained traumatic injuries such as avulsion and intrusion. Clinical success is resultant from the reestablishment of blood supply to the ischemic but uninfected dental pulp tissue. Reinnervation from sensory axons should then followed and the axons is likely to be recruited from the apical region.

In 2011, an important demonstration in the field of regenerative endodontics was found. The investigators found out that the influx of blood in the apical area into the disinfected canals was coincided with a clinically significant mesenchymal stem cells transfer into the root canal system. It is established that these procedures were actually stem cell-based procedures.

== Etiology of pulpal necrosis ==
Trauma has been recognised as the most common cause of pulpal necrosis in immature permanent teeth. Up to 35 percent of children between the ages of 7 and 15 years experience traumatic dental injuries when the root development of the permanent teeth are still incomplete. Half of the teeth are then likely to be diagnosed with pulpal necrosis with greater incidence in teeth which suffer from severe injuries like avulsions and combination injuries. Hertwig epithelial root sheath (HERS) could be potentially damaged when the young developing dentition is traumatised. HERS is proven to be essential for root formation and maturation by directing the proliferation and differentiation of multipotent stem cells.

The presence of dens evaginatus or dens invaginatus were the second most common etiology of pulp necrosis in immature teeth. Dens evaginatus is more common between these 2 dental anomalies. It is seen on clinical and radiographic examination as an additional cusp, typically projecting into the occlusal table of a mandibular premolar. The incidence of dens evaginatus has been reported to affect up to 6% of the population, with greater incidence in certain ethnic groups. Dens invaginatus is a rare dental anomaly where there is an infolding of enamel into the dentine.

The presence of dens evaginatus can lead to rapid pulpal necrosis when there is continuous trauma from occlusion. In both dens evaginatus and dens invaginatus, direct exposure of pulp to the oral environment will eventually lead to inflammation and infection of the pulp.

== Clinical problem ==
Odontogenesis is a multiplex and long process of postnatal organogenesis. A tooth needs a supplemental 3 years after eruption to complete the root formation and mark the end of tooth development.

Early loss of young immature permanent teeth can be detrimental, leading to loss of function and interference of phonetics. Maxillary and mandibular bone development may be altered, especially when the patient is still growing. Psychosocial health of young patient can be severely impacted. Implants can interfere with the normal orofacial growth and hence this is contraindicated in patients who are still undergoing cranio skeletal development.

Apexification procedures were traditionally used to treat teeth with pulpal pathology to resolve the signs and symptoms of pulp pathosis. Long term calcium hydroxide treatment or placement of mineral trioxide aggregate apical plug was performed. However, these treatments provide little to no benefit for continuous root development, leaving a thin fragile dentinal wall. This can increase the susceptibility of the tooth to fractures and decrease the survival rate of the tooth.

Therefore, it is important that dentists should make effort by all means to retain the natural dentition hopefully beyond the maturation stage. Both vital and non vital pulp therapies should be taken into consideration to keep the natural teeth as long as possible.

== Biological basis of regenerative endodontics ==
A successful tissue regeneration relies on an appropriate source of stem progenitor cells, growth factors and scaffolds to control the development of the specific tissue.

The first component for tissue engineering is an appropriate source of progenitor/stem cells by using cells which are able to differentiate into the desired tissue component. The use of postnatal autologous stem cells, especially the mesenchymal stem cells is optimal in regenerative endodontic applications. These mesenchymal stem cells are found in dental pulp (DPSCs), the apical papilla (SCAP) and even in the inflamed periapical tissue (iPAPCs) collected during endodontic surgical procedures. Some other potential sources of postnatal stem cells in the oral environment are the tooth germ progenitor cells (TGPCs), dental follicle stem cells (DFSCs), salivary gland stem cells (SGSCs), stem cells from human exfoliated deciduous teeth (SHED), periodontal ligament stem cells (BMSCs), oral epithelial stem cells (OESCs), gingival-derived mesenchymal stem cells (GMSCs) and periosteal stem cells (PSCs).

The second component of tissue engineering focuses on growth factors or other tissue-inducing mediators. By definition, stem cells are capable to differentiate into various cell phenotypes based on their lineage and exposure to the environmental stimuli, for instance, growth factors, extracellular matrix, hypoxia, or other conditions. Therefore, the environment is an important factor in regulating tissue differentiation. The clinical procedure of lacerating the apical papilla and subsequently delivering a high local concentration of stem cells into the root canal space may not be adequate to direct their differentiation into cells of the pulp-dentin complex. Growth factors should be considered as important adjuncts instead. It is important to remember this key concept while interpreting the histological studies after regenerative procedures, where the lack of control of endogenous growth factors may result in histologic signs of tissue repair rather than regeneration. This issue is significant for regenerative procedures, since the non-collagenous proteins contained within dentin include several crucial growth factors such as TGF-β.

The third component of tissue engineering is a scaffold. Scaffolds play a major role in regulating stem cell differentiation by local release of growth factors, or by the signaling cascade that is triggered when stem cells bind to the extracellular matrix and to each other. Scaffolds may be endogenous, such as collagen, dentin, etc., or synthetic substances, such as hydrogels, mineral trioxide aggregate or other compounds. This is an essential principle in the interpretation of clinical regenerative studies. For instance, instrumentation of dentin cylinders followed by irrigation with 5.25% NaOCl and extensive washing results in a dentin surface that promotes differentiation of cells into clastic-like cells which resorb dentin. On the contrary, if the dentin cylinders are irrigated with 17% EDTA either alone, or following NaOCl treatment, a dentin surface that promotes cell differentiation into cells expressing an appropriate marker for a mineralizing phenotype, such as the dentin sialoprotein is produced. Therefore, the selection of irrigants as well as their sequence may play essential roles in conditioning dentin into a surface capable of supporting differentiation of a desired cell phenotype.

== Cell homing ==
The concept of cell homing in dental pulp and dentin regeneration was first proposed in 2010. In tissue regeneration, cell homing consists of 2 distinct cellular processes: cell recruitment and differentiation. Recruitment is the directional cell migration to tissue injury or defects, while differentiation is the process of transformation of stem/progenitor cells into progressively mature and matrix synthesis cells. Stem/progenitor cells are capable of differentiating into odontoblasts, pulp fibroblasts and other niche cells in dental pulp and dentin regeneration. To ensure the success of dental pulp and dentin regeneration in the adult, exogenously delivered and/or endogenous growth factors must induce the sprouting of neural fibrils and endothelial cells along with other blood vessel resident cells.

== Regeneration versus revascularization ==
There are some controversy that exists over the terms "regeneration" versus "revascularization". The term revascularization arose from the trauma literature, and the observation that pulp in teeth with transient or permanent ischemia could have re-establishment of its blood supply in particular cases. These literatures provided the fundamental knowledge of factors essential for revascularization to occur, notably the evidence that teeth with immature roots and open apices had elevated rates of revascularization and continued root development. However, these findings do not include the intentional use of tissue engineering principles despite their significant influence in developing the contemporary regenerative endodontic procedures. In contrast, contemporary regenerative endodontic procedures consider the presence of an enriched source of stem cells within the apical tissues, their delivery into root canal systems, and the intentional release and use of local growth factors embedded into the dentin. Hence, contemporary regenerative endodontics originates from the trauma literature and embarks into the field of tissue engineering.

Regeneration indicates an overall objective of reproducing the original tissue histology and function. To date, tissue engineering appears to offer the greatest opportunity for regeneration. Since high concentrations of stem cells are delivered into the root canal space when lacerating the apical papilla in the immature permanent tooth, this clinical procedure accomplishes one major element of the triad of tissue engineering. Ongoing research has evaluated combinations of stem cells, growth factors, and scaffolds that result in histological regeneration of pulp tissues. On the contrary, the concept of revascularization focuses only on the delivery of blood into the root canal space to allow the pulp space to be filled with vital tissue as a means of prompting wound healing. Therefore, a focus on "revascularization" would disregard the potential role of growth factors and scaffolds in histological recapitulation of the pulp-dentin complex. Although angiogenesis and the establishment of a functional blood supply is a key feature in the maintenance and maturation of a regenerating tissue, positive responses to pulp sensitivity tests such as cold or EPT have been reported in some of the published cases. This indicates that a space that was previously vacant (debrided root canal) may become populated with an innervated tissue supported by vascularity. Taken together, the core concepts of tissue engineering distinguish a regenerative treatment paradigm from a revascularization philosophy.

== Treatment plan ==
The primary concern in regenerative endodontics is to promote healing of the diseased tissues, prevention of relapse or recurrence of the disease, and patient well-being (patient centered). Thus, the primary therapeutic goal of regenerative endodontic procedures is to promote the healing, survival and function of the tooth. A study showed that regenerative endodontic procedures had better clinical outcomes as compared to apexification procedures, both with mineral trioxide aggregate and calcium hydroxide such as in aspects of absence of pain, swelling and sinus tracts.

The secondary therapeutic goal of regenerative endodontic procedures is continued root development. A study has shown that teeth treated with revascularization showed a significantly greater percentage increase in root length compared with teeth treated by either mineral trioxide aggregate or calcium hydroxide apexification. Regenerative procedures promoted a decrease in apical diameter (apical closure). Root development allows the increase of the resistance to fracture and improve the tooth survival rate.

The tertiary therapeutic goal of regenerative endodontic procedures is return of pulp vitality. Regenerative endodontic procedures suggests that free nerve endings of the root end are guided into the canal by specific chemical signals. Nonetheless, the presence of nerve endings suggests the presence of a vital tissue that is immune-competent due to the intimate association of innervation with blood vessels and the immune system. It also suggests the recovery of sensation that is important for the detection of actual or potential injury to the tooth organ.

== Clinical outcomes ==
Regenerative endodontic procedures is a new treatment option which must be objectively compared with the longer established, more traditional endodontic treatment procedures for immature teeth, known as apexification procedures.

The primary goal of any endodontic therapy is the resolution of infection and the signs and symptoms of inflammation leading to apical periodontitis. Regenerative endodontic procedures depend on efficient and powerful chemical disinfection, which is then followed by the repair and growth of the tooth that promotes continued root development and re-establishment of nerve functions of the tooth.

However, pulpal necrosis in immature teeth often results in incomplete root development. These teeth often have thin root canal walls which are susceptible to fracture after treatment. Therefore, complete cleaning and shaping as well as obturation of these teeth are difficult or sometimes impossible, due to high risk of fracture during the procedure Clinical outcome of regenerative endodontics can be observed within 6 months of treatment such as no pain, soft-tissue swelling, or sinus tract. Radiographic outcomes such as resolution of apical radiolucency are often observed by 6 months (AAE).Various studies on regenerative endodontics have shown resolution of periapical radiolucency at 6-month follow-up.

== Regenerative endodontic procedure ==
Regenerative endodontics has 3 critical steps: adequate disinfection of the root canal system, induction of bleeding through overinstrumentation to create a scaffold for stem cells, and coronal sealing of the blood clot with a biocompatible material, such as mineral trioxide aggregate.

The procedure is applied in two visits as follows:

During the first visit, after local anesthesia injection; isolation of the tooth is done with a rubber dam, and access is performed with a cutting instrument, which is a round bur to remove the dead pulp. Then, irrigation of the canal is carried out with sodium hypochlorite solution and physiological saline, which is later dried and intracanal medicament (such as triple antibiotic paste) is placed into the canal. The tooth is temporarily sealed for 1 to 4 weeks.

During the second visit, which is after 3 weeks, the tooth was accessed for any signs and symptoms. Hence, the asymptomatic tooth is proceeded to the next step of regenerative endodontic treatment. Bleeding was induced by overinstrumenting beyond the root with a thin instrument (known as file)) to form a blood clot. Then, an absorbable collagen barrier is placed above the blood clot followed with mineral trioxide aggregate and glass ionomer cement. The patient is then recalled after 7 days to ensure setting of the filling material of mineral trioxide aggregate, and replacement of the glass ionomer cement with composite resin.

=== Follow-up Observation and Measurement ===
Radiograph images, before and after the procedure are used to evaluate the outcome of the treatment. The patients are scheduled to follow up at 3, 6, 9, and 12 months after the completion of therapy. The tooth is accessed for different aspects such as pain, swelling, sinus tract, mobility, tooth discoloration, and the occlusion relationship. At the 12-month follow-up, CBCT images are taken to analyze the root development, in specific to access for the disappearance of apical radiolucency, increase of root length or a decrease of the apical foramen, or both.

Clinically, regenerative endodontic treatment is carried out in teeth with necrotic pulps and immature apices. In order to promote pulp regeneration in infected root canals, greater efficiency of disinfection is required. Disinfecting agents for regenerative procedures include sodium hypochlorite, antibiotic or calcium hydroxide dressings. Although sodium hypochlorite has antimicrobial effect, it has detrimental effects to the stem cells at the end of the tooth, which can hinder survival and differentiation of these cells. Therefore, sodium hypochlorite is advised to be used at a lower concentration so as to achieve the optimum effect for antimicrobial activity and differentiation of the stem cells. Besides, mineral trioxide aggregate is used as the coronal barrier on the blood clot due to its biocompatibility, and its ability to promote cell differentiation and hard tissue production without adverse tissue reactions.

== Advantages ==
There are some benefits of regenerative endodontics such as: revitalization of the tooth, continued root development and, potentially, increasing fracture resistance.

Regenerative endodontic treatment helps in true pulpal regeneration and re-establishment of the pulp-dentin complex, which leads to revitalisation of the tooth. It may be an alternative treatment option in the management of root resorption especially when the prognosis is deemed poor because of severe resorption.

== Research ==
King's College London published in January 2017 on the regeneration of dentine with collagen sponge filled with glycogen synthase kinase (GSK-3) .

== See also ==
- Dental pulp stem cells
- Toothache
- Tooth regeneration
