= Apexification =

Apexification is a method of dental treatment to induce a calcific barrier in a root with incomplete formation or open apex of a tooth with necrotic pulp. Pulpal involvement usually occurs as a consequence of trauma or caries involvement of young or immature permanent teeth. As a sequelae of untreated pulp involvement, loss of pulp vitality or necrotic pulp took place for the involved teeth.

The main purpose of apexification includes restoring the original physiologic structures and functions of the pulp-dentin complex of the teeth. In addition to that, the elimination of the pulp tissue within a tooth, the disinfection of root canal system by using irrigants such as sodium hypochlorite and ethylenediaminetetraacetic acid are the necessary steps to ensure that the purpose of apexification is being met.

The apexification procedure will normally requires several monthly appointments or follow-ups to observe any calcific changes induced at the apex of tooth concerned. In these visits, a material known as calcium hydroxide ( Ca(OH)_{2} ) will be placed inside the root canal systems to eliminate intracanal infection, stimulates calcification and achieves apical barrier seal at the apex of tooth root. The success rate of applying the traditionally used calcium hydroxide to induce calcific barrier is between 74%-100%. Nowadays, a newer material known as mineral trioxide aggregate (MTA) is widely used as well.

Some difficulties are said to be a major clinical challenge when carrying out apexification, including difficulty in achieving appropriate apical seal with an open apex. Besides that, the termination of development of dentinal walls after pulpal pathologies occur will result in roots with thin dentinal wall and thus, producing a higher risk of tooth fracture.

== Indication and objectives ==
Apexification is indicated for immature permanent teeth that are non-vital with incompletely formed roots. The objective of this procedure is to induce root end closure (apexification) at the apices of immature roots through the formation of mineralized tissue. Apical closure can take various forms but in most cases, it appears to be irregular and aberrant. Along with apical closure, root development may or may not continue.

== Materials ==
There are different materials to be used in apexification such as Mineral trioxide aggregate (MTA), Bioceramics and Biodentine.

=== Mineral trioxide aggregate ===
Mineral trioxide aggregate (MTA) is composed primarily of tricalcium silicate, tricalcium aluminate, tricalcium oxide, and silicate oxide. It has been used in endodontics as a root-end filling material, and sets in the presence of moisture. It presents in either grey or white form, the difference between the two being that white MTA lacks iron.

After numerous testing and analysis, MTA showed superior properties from its physical properties and biocompatibility. It is shown to have less marginal gap formation, less leakage and better adaptation than other filling materials. Besides, root ends filled with MTA showed good healing with absence of periradicular inflammation over the root-end filling material, as compared to amalgam. The use of MTA as endodontic repair material stimulates bone formation as well as inhibits bone resorption.

Due to its physical properties and biocompatibility, MTA has been used in numerous clinical situations other than as a root-end filling. It is widely used to repair perforations, to close open apices in apexification, as a direct pulp capping material for deep carious tooth, and to cover pulp stumps for apexogenesis. This material possesses great sealing ability, good antimicrobial activity, great biocompatibility, and enhances dentin biomineralization. However, there is some known drawbacks to the use of MTA such as the potential release of hazardous substances, potential for discoloration, and inconvenience of handling.

=== Bioceramics ===
In order to overcome the limitations of MTA, recent advance in dental materials has introduced bioceramics as a new root canal obturation and repair material. Its composition mainly includes zirconium oxide, calcium silicates, calcium phosphate monobasic, calcium hydroxide, filler, and thickening agents.

As a pre-mixed form, it is easy to use and is applied in root canal therapy. Biodentin has similar to or better than those of MTA, from biocompatibility, antimicrobial activity, sealing ability and ability to enhance dentin biomineralization. The bonding ability in a high-humidity environment and color stability of biodentine were significantly better than those of MTA.

=== Biodentine ===
Biodentine is a tricalcium silicate-based material, as an alternative to permanent dentin. It is biocompatible and is a new bioactive dentin substitute cement, which is composed of powder that consists of tricalcium silicate, dicalcium silicate, calcium carbonate, calcium oxide, zirconium oxide, and calcium hydroxide. It allows good marginal sealing, thus preventing marginal leakage as well as protecting the underlying pulp by inducing the formation of tertiary dentin.

Unlike other dentin substitutes, biodentine application does not require any conditioning of the dentin surface in providing good sealing property. This is because tag-like structures are formed after the penetration of biodentine material into the dentin tubules. Besides, it can also be bonded with different types of adhesives before finishing the final restoration with composite resin.

The setting time of biodentine is shorter as compared with that of MTA, In conclusion, this material is clinically indicated for permanent dentin substitute, direct and indirect pulp capping, pulpotomy, repair of furcation and root perforations, retrograde root-end filling, and apexification.

== Procedure ==
Proper assessment of the tooth is important in determining an accurate diagnosis in order to formulate an appropriate treatment plan. Clinical evaluation of pulpal status includes a comprehensive history and diagnostic tests. Radiographic examination is used to determine the maturity of the developing root. However, immature teeth are commonly associated with young patients and pulp testing in children is complex and subjective to nature.

The following steps are included in this procedure:

1. The affected tooth is isolated using rubber dam
2. An access opening is made to reach the pulp chamber
3. A file is placed in the root canal and a radiograph is taken to establish the root length. Care should be taken to avoid pushing instruments through the apex
4. Remnants of the pulp are then removed using barbed broaches and files
5. The canal is flushed with hydrogen peroxide to remove debris and is then irrigated with sodium hypochlorite and saline
6. The material of choice is placed in the canal and an endodontic plugger is used to push the material to the apical end
7. A cotton pledget is placed and the cavity is sealed with reinforced zinc oxide-eugenol cement

Apexification procedure can be completed in one or two appointments depending on the initial clinical sign and symptoms. The procedure may also vary depending on the materials or medication used. Generally, the treatment paste is allowed to remain for six months before the evaluation for an apical closure.

== Follow up ==
If apical closure has not occurred within six months, the root canal is retreated again with the material of choice. Ideally, the tooth should demonstrate continued apical growth and closure or an apical stop. When closure is observed, the canal is filled with a root canal filling material known as gutta-percha.
