= Calcium aluminoferrite =

One of the four main mineral phases of the Portland cement clinker

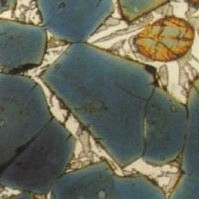
Photomicrograph (0.11 mm) of clinker polished section showing tetracalcium aluminoferrite (C_{4}AF) (white) and tricalcium aluminate (C_{3}A) (grey) occupying interstitial space between alite (C_{3}S) (blue) and belite (C_{2}S) (orange) crystals. These are false (interference) colors.

Calcium aluminoferrite (Ca_{2}(Al,Fe)_{2}O_{5}) is a dark brown crystalline phase commonly found in cements. In the cement industry it is termed tetracalcium aluminoferrite or ferrite. In cement chemist notation (CCN), it is abbreviated as C_{4}AF meaning 4CaO·Al_{2}O_{3}·Fe_{2}O_{3} in the oxide notation. It also exists in nature as the rare mineral brownmillerite.

== Properties of the pure phase ==
In the absence of elements other than calcium, aluminium, iron and oxygen, calcium aluminoferrite forms a solid solution series of formula Ca_{2}(Al_{x}Fe_{1−x})_{2}O_{5} for all values of x in the range 0–0.7. Compositions with x > 0.7 do not exist at ordinary pressures (see dicalcium aluminate). The crystal is orthorhombic, and is normally lath-like. Its density varies from 4026 kg·m^{−3} (x = 0) to 3614 kg⋅m^{−3} (x = 0.7). All compositions melt incongruently in the range 1400−1450 °C. They are ferromagnetic, progressively more so as iron content increases. These phases are easily prepared from the oxides.

== Phases in Portland cement clinker ==
In Portland cement clinker, calcium aluminoferrite (C_{4}AF) occurs as an "interstitial phase", crystallizing from the melt as the reaction end-product of the flux components (Al_{2}O_{3} and Fe_{2}O_{3}) added in the raw materials to lower the high melting point of the oxide mix CaO-SiO_{2}. Its presence in clinker is solely due to the need to obtain liquid at the peak kiln processing temperature (1400−1450 °C), facilitating the formation of the desired silicate phases. Apart from this benefit, its effects on cement properties are little more than those of a diluent. Its forms an impure solid solution that deviates markedly in composition from the simple chemical formula. The calcium aluminoferrite phase acts as a repository for many of the minor elements in the clinker. Most of the transition metals in the cement are found in the ferrite phase, notably titanium, manganese and zinc. There is also a substantial amount of magnesium and silicon, and because of this, oxides other than CaO, Al_{2}O_{3} and Fe_{2}O_{3} often make up 15% of the mass of the calcium aluminoferrite. This substitution reduces its melting point to around 1350 °C.

The typical chemical composition of calcium aluminoferrite (C_{4}AF) for three different clinker bulk Fe_{2}O_{3} contents is given in the next table.^{,} The calcium aluminoferrite mean composition is clearly dominated by CaO (43.7 wt. %), Al_{2}O_{3} (19.3 wt %), and Fe_{2}O_{3} (25.4 wt. %). The mean contents in SiO_{2} (4.2 wt. %) and other oxides are marginal.

Chemical composition of calcium aluminoferrite (C_{4}AF) as a function of the bulk concentration (mass %, or wt. %) of Fe_{2}O_{3} in the clinker
Oxide	Mass %	Mass %	Mass %
Bulk Fe_{2}O_{3} in clinker	0.29	2.88	4.87
SiO_{2}	4.0	2.6	6.1
Al_{2}O_{3}	20.2	20.8	17.0
Fe_{2}O_{3}	24.5	23.9	27.7
CaO	44.6	46.4	40.2
MgO	3.7	3.1	4.9
Na_{2}O	0.1	0.1	0.1
K_{2}O	0.1	0.1	0.1
TiO_{2}	1.9	2.7	1.7
Mn_{2}O_{3}	0.1	0.3	1.5
ZnO	1.1	0.1	0.9

Note that the sum of Al_{2}O_{3} and Fe_{2}O_{3} contents in calcium aluminoferrite (C_{4}AF) in the table here above remains constant at 44.7 mass % as illustrated in the table here below.

Sum of Al_{2}O_{3} and Fe_{2}O_{3} in C_{4}AF in the above table
Oxide	Mass %	Mass %	Mass %
Bulk Fe_{2}O_{3} in clinker	0.29	2.88	4.87
Al_{2}O_{3}	20.2	20.8	17.0
Fe_{2}O_{3}	24.5	23.9	27.7
Sum	44.7	44.7	44.7

== Behavior in cements ==
Calcium aluminoferrite (C_{4}AF) has little effect upon the physical properties of cement. On hydration it forms hydrogarnet (4 CaO·Al_{2}O_{3}· n H_{2}O) and hydrated iron oxide gel. In principle, this is a fast and energetic exothermic reaction, but precipitation of an insoluble layer of hydrated iron oxide upon the calcium aluminoferrite crystal surface forms a barrier to further reaction. In the case of Portland cement, subsequent slow reaction with dissolved sulfate forms AFm phases, which have negligible strength-giving properties. In the case of calcium aluminate cements (CAC), the situation is less clear-cut, but there is little contribution to early strength. Calcium aluminoferrite is also present in calcium sulfoaluminate (CSA) cements, and again contributes no strength.

== See also ==
The three other main mineral phases of Portland cement clinker are:

- Alite, C_{3}S, or 3CaO·SiO_{2}
- Belite, C_{2}S, or 2CaO·SiO_{2}
- Tricalcium aluminate, C_{3}A, or 3CaO·Al_{2}O_{3}
