= Jaffeite =

Sorosilicate mineral

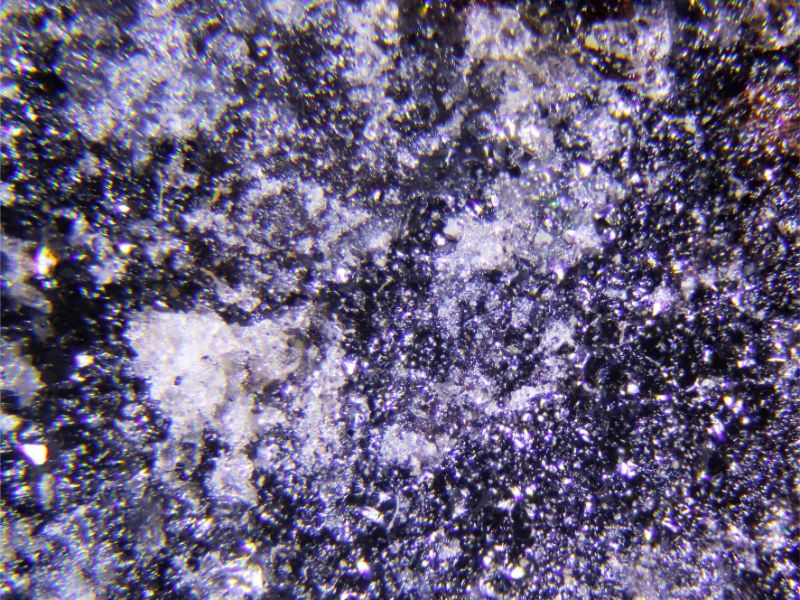
- A close up picture of the white crystal mineral from a sample from Kombat mine, Namibia

General
- Category: Minerals
- Formula: Ca_{6}Si_{2}O_{7}(OH)_{6}

Jaffeite is a hydrated calcium silicate with the following chemical formula: Ca_{6}Si_{2}O_{7}(OH)_{6}

== Occurrence ==
The mineral was first found at the Kombat Mine in Namibia. In 1989, the mineral was named after Prof. Howard W. Jaffe (1919–2002) of the University of Massachusetts Amherst.
