= Howard W. Jaffe =

American geologist

Howard William Jaffe
- Born: February 16, 1919
- Died: May 13, 2002 (aged 83); Amherst, Massachusetts, USA
- Education: Brooklyn College; University of Geneva
- Scientific career
- Institutions: United States Bureau of Mines; Union Carbide Corporation; University of Massachusetts Amherst

Howard William Jaffe (February 16, 1919 – May 13, 2002) was an American geologist and mineralogist. He is a pioneer in the study of the crystal chemistry of rock-forming minerals and of the link between the structural attributes and the physical and chemical properties of minerals.

Jaffe studied at Brooklyn College in New York, obtained B.A. in 1942. After graduating from college, he worked for the U.S. Bureau of Mines between 1942 and 1957 in a varieties of positions to assist Allied forces in wars. He worked for Union Carbide Corporation on developing the growth technique of YAG crystals, which is later widely used for laser surgery. He joined the faculty of the Department of Geology at University of Massachusetts Amherst in 1965 without a graduate degree. He stayed at Amherst until his retirement in 1991. During these years, he was visiting professor at University of Geneva, eventually obtaining his D.Sc. in geology in 1972.

The mineral species jaffeite is named after him since 1989. His wife is Elizabeth Boudreau Jaffe, also a geologist and a collaborator, died in 1999. They have three children, Andrew, Stephen, and Marina.

== Bibliography ==
- Jaffe, Howard W; Jaffe, Elizabeth B (1973). Bedrock geology of the Monroe Quadrangle, Orange County, New York. Albany: University of the State of New York/the State Education Dept. OCLC 831722787.
- Jaffe, Elizabeth B.; Jaffe, Howard W. (1986). Geology of the Adirondack high peaks region : a hiker's guide. Glen Falls, N.Y.: Adirondack Mountain Club. ISBN 0-935272-35-6. OCLC 15414946.
- Jaffe, Howard W. (1988). Crystal chemistry and refractivity. Cambridge: Cambridge University Press. ISBN 0-521-25505-8. OCLC 17731335.
- Jaffe, Howard W. (1990). Introduction to crystal chemistry. Cambridge: Cambridge University Press. ISBN 978-0-521-36985-5. OCLC 927602888.

== See also ==
- Hatten Yoder
- Yttrium aluminium garnet
