= Mahmoud Torabinejad =

Mahmoud Torabinejad (Persian: محمود ترابی‌نژاد) is an Iranian Professor of endodontics and the Director of the Advanced Specialty Education Program in Endodontics at Loma Linda University School of Dentistry in Loma Linda, California.

== Early life and education ==
Torabinejad was born in Kashan, Iran. He graduated from Tehran Dental School in 1971, and trained in endodontics at the University of Washington.

== Career ==
Torabinejad practices clinically and is a researcher at Loma Linda University. In addition, he is involved with the Mahmoud Torabinejad Clinical Research Center in Isfahan, Iran.

He developed mineral trioxide aggregate, a material used in the repair of root perforations, and in creating an artificial barrier where a normal root canal filling is not possible, treating internal root resorption, and pulp capping.

Torabinejad is the author of many highly cited papers in the field of endodontics. In a 2011 review of the most cited papers in endodontics, Dr. Torabinejad was the author of 12 of the top 100 papers.

Torabinejad has also written a number of books with co-author Richard E. Walton.
