= Deciduous teeth =

First set of teeth in diphyodonts

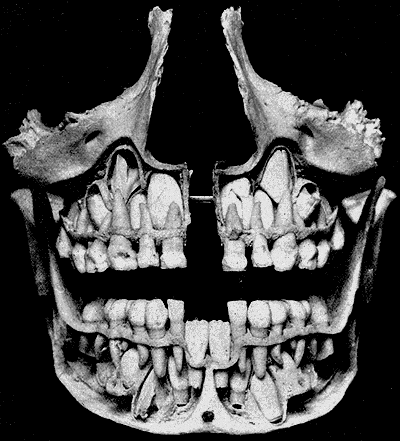
- Cross-section of upper and lower jaws with permanent teeth located above and below the deciduous teeth prior to their exfoliation. The deciduous mandibular central incisors have already been exfoliated.

Details

Identifiers
- Latin: dentes decidui
- MeSH: D014094
- TA98: A05.1.03.076
- TA2: 912
- FMA: 75151

Deciduous teeth or primary teeth, also informally known as baby teeth, milk teeth, or temporary teeth, are the first set of teeth in the growth and development of humans and other diphyodonts, which include most mammals but not elephants, kangaroos, or manatees, which are polyphyodonts. Deciduous teeth develop during the embryonic stage of development and erupt (break through the gums and become visible in the mouth) during infancy. They are usually lost and replaced by permanent teeth, but in the absence of their permanent replacements, they can remain functional for many years into adulthood.

== Development ==
=== Formation ===
Primary teeth begin to form during the embryonic phase of human life. The development of primary teeth starts at the sixth week of tooth development as the dental lamina. This process starts at the midline and then spreads back into the posterior region. By the time the embryo is eight weeks old, there are ten buds on the upper and lower arches that will eventually become the primary (deciduous) dentition. These teeth will continue to form until they erupt in the mouth. In the primary dentition, there are a total of twenty teeth: five per quadrant and ten per arch. The eruption of these teeth ("teething") typically begins around the age of six months and continues until 25–33 months of age during the primary dentition period. Usually, the first teeth seen in the mouth are the mandibular central incisors and the last are the maxillary second molars.

The primary teeth are made up of central incisors, lateral incisors, canines, first molars, and second molars; there is one in each quadrant, making a total of four of each tooth. All of these are gradually replaced by similarly named permanent counterparts except for the primary first and second molars; they are replaced by premolars.

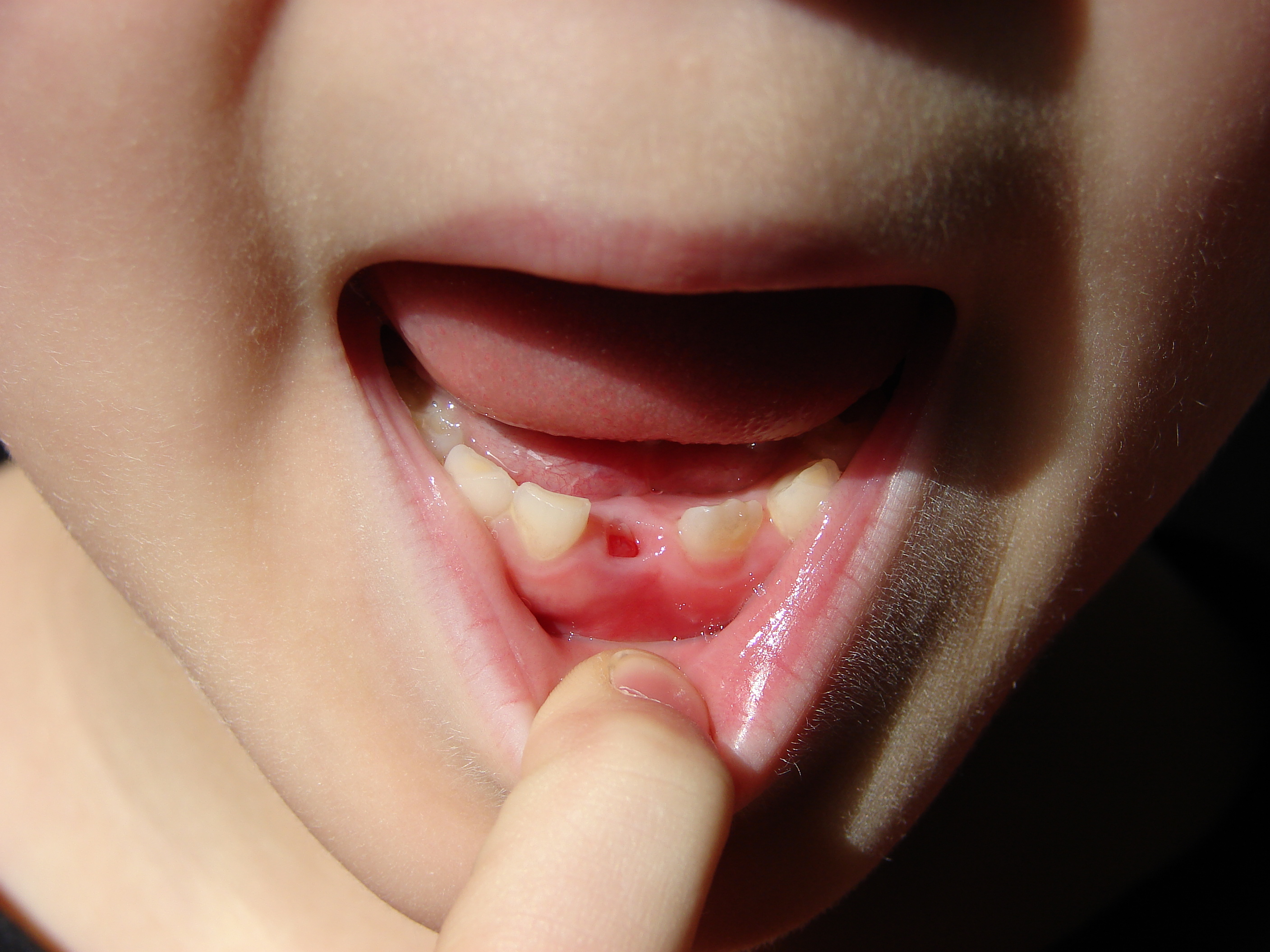
Bottom teeth of a seven-year-old, showing primary teeth (left), a lost primary tooth and visible socket (middle), and a fully erupted permanent tooth (right)

Teething ages, by tooth
Tooth	Upper	Lower
Central incisors	8–12 months	6–10 months
Lateral incisors	9–13 months	10–16 months
First molars	13–19 months	14–18 months
Canine teeth	16–22 months	17–23 months
Second molars	25–33 months	23–31 months

Exfoliation ages, by tooth
Tooth	Upper	Lower
Central incisors	6–7 years	
Lateral incisors	7–8 years	
First molars	9–11 years	
Canine teeth	10–12 years	9–12 years
Second molars	10–12 years	

The erupting permanent teeth cause root resorption, where the permanent teeth push on the roots of the primary teeth, causing the roots to be dissolved by odontoclasts (as well as surrounding alveolar bone by osteoclasts) and become absorbed by the forming permanent teeth. The process of shedding primary teeth and their replacement by permanent teeth is called tooth exfoliation; normally without pain or bleeding. This may last from six to twelve years of age. By age thirteen, there usually are only permanent teeth remaining. However, it is not extremely rare for one or more primary teeth to be retained beyond this age, sometimes well into adulthood, often because its secondary tooth failed to develop.

== Function ==
Primary teeth are essential in the development of the mouth. The primary teeth maintain the arch length within the jaw, the bone and the permanent teeth replacements develop from the same tooth germs as the primary teeth. The primary teeth provide guidance for the eruption pathway of the permanent teeth. Also the muscles of the jaw and the formation of the jaw bones depend on the primary teeth to maintain proper spacing for permanent teeth. The roots of primary teeth provide a pathway for the permanent teeth to erupt. The primary teeth are important for the development of the child's speech, for the child's smile and play a role in chewing of food, although children who have had their primary teeth removed (usually as a result of dental caries or dental injuries) can still eat and chew to a certain extent.

== Caries in deciduous teeth ==
Dental caries, also known as tooth decay and cavities, is one of the most prevalent chronic diseases among children worldwide. This oral condition involves bacterial infection which demineralizes and destroys tooth tissues. In primary dentition, extensive tooth decay is the most common dental disease. An extensive carious lesion affects at least half of a tooth and possibly involves the pulp.

=== Treatment for caries ===
Tooth decay in primary teeth tends to progress quite quickly and often reaches the pulp of the tooth. In cases of extensive tooth decay, the pulp must be treated to maintain the health of the tooth and its supporting tissues. In pulp therapy, areas of decay and infected pulp tissue are removed, then the pulp is sealed with medicaments, medications placed over the pulp to maintain survival and promote repair. Treatment options include:

- Indirect pulp capping (IPC)
- Direct pulp capping (DPC)
- Pulpotomy
- Pulpectomy

Indirect pulp capping (IPC) is a treatment that leaves the deepest carious tooth material (dentin) next to the pulp undisrupted to avoid exposing the pulp. The caries-affected dentin is covered with a biocompatible medicament to form a seal over the tooth. Medicaments used in IPC include calcium hydroxide and alternates including bonding agents and liners.

Direct pulp capping (DPC) is a treatment performed when a pin-point or small pulp exposure of 1mm or less occurs after removal of carious tooth material (dentin) excavation. The pulp is covered with a medicament. This technique has limited use when pulp is exposed due to injury but is generally not accepted for managing carious pulp exposures in primary teeth, as it has been shown to have limited success. Medicaments used in DPC include calcium hydroxide and alternates such as mineral trioxide aggregate (MTA).

Pulpotomy is a treatment performed on a primary tooth with extensive decay without involving pulp in the root canal (radicular pulp) (Cochrane). The entire coronal pulp is removed and the radicular pulp bleeding is stopped. The remaining radicular pulp is treated with a medicament. Pulpotomy is the most frequently used vital pulp therapy technique for deep dental caries in primary teeth. Medicaments used in pulpotomy include commonly formocresol, MTA and ferric sulfates and less commonly sodium hypochlorite, calcium hydroxide, and tricalcium silicate.

Pulpectomy is a treatment performed on a primary tooth with extensive decay and involving pulp in the root canal (radicular pulp with irreversible pulpitis or necrosis). The radicular pulp is removed, the pulp canals are filled with a medicament, and a filling is put on the tooth. Medicaments used in pulpectomy include resorbable materials so that they will undergo resorption (dissolution) along with the primary tooth root to allow for proper tooth loss (exfoliation) and replacement with permanent successor teeth.

==== Preformed crowns ====
Decayed primary teeth can be restored with a fitted crown. This can be made from a variety of different materials and attached using a range of methods. A common one used amongst children with caries is a preformed metal crown (PMC). This type of crown is pressed over a decayed tooth without any preparation, local anaesthetic or caries removal, also termed the Hall Technique. Studies have shown that more dental practitioners prefer conventional fillings as opposed to PMC's. However, studies have shown that the risk of both major and minor failures along with pain in the long term was comparatively lower using PMCs as opposed to conventional restorations. Patients who had crowns fitted using the Hall technique also experienced noticeably less discomfort at the time of the appointment, relative to fillings.

However, the populations studied were limited to fit and healthy children, and additional research into the tolerance and outcomes of this treatment needs to be done for children with special needs.

=== Medicaments used in pulp treatment ===
After direct pulp capping, it is unclear whether any one medicament is superior.

After pulpotomy, MTA is the most effective medicament and formocresol is also effective. Both are more effective than calcium hydroxide, which is more likely to fail. While there are concerns about the toxicity of formocresol, currently there are no reports of toxicity related to formocresol use for vital pulp therapies in children. An undesirable effect of treatment with MTA is the grey discoloration of treated teeth, but this effect is purely esthetic and does not affect the success of pulp treatment.

For pulpectomy, it is unclear whether any one medicament is superior. Zinc oxide eugenol (ZOE) may be the best choice for filling in the root canals after pulpectomy in primary teeth, but more evidence is needed to confirm the superiority. ZOE is effective, inexpensive, and reasonably safe for use in children.

==== Treatment recommendations ====
It is unclear which pulp therapy (i.e. IPC, DPC, pulpotomy, pulpectomy) is the most effective, as there are no studies directly comparing these treatment options. The success rates are similar amongst the various therapies. The choice of therapy should be made based on the removal of caries-affected dentin, whether there is a pulp exposure, adverse effects, clinical expertise, and patient preference.

== Society and culture ==
In almost all European languages the primary teeth are called "baby teeth" or "milk teeth". In the United States and Canada, the term "baby teeth" is common. In some Asian countries they are referred to as "fall teeth" since they will eventually fall out.

Although shedding of a milk tooth is predominantly associated with positive emotions such as pride and joy by the majority of the children, socio-cultural factors (such as parental education, religion or country of origin) affect the various emotions children experience during the loss of their first primary tooth.

Various cultures have customs relating to the loss of deciduous teeth. In English-speaking countries, the tooth fairy is a popular childhood fiction that a fairy rewards children when their baby teeth fall out. Children typically place a tooth under their pillow at night or on a bedside table. The fairy is said to take the tooth and replace it with money or small gifts while they sleep. In some parts of Australia, Sweden and Norway, the children put the tooth in a glass of water. In medieval Scandinavia there was a similar tradition, surviving to the present day in Iceland, of tannfé, 'tooth-money', a gift to a child when it cuts its first tooth. In Nigeria, the Igbo in a similar custom expect a visiting relative or guest to make a gift or donation to an infant upon the visitor's sighting of the infant's deciduous teeth. Hausa culture has it that a child with a fallen tooth should not let a lizard see the toothless gum because if a lizard does see it, no tooth will grow in its place.

Other traditions are associated with mice or other rodents because of their sharp, everlasting teeth. The character Ratón Pérez appears in the tale of The Vain Little Mouse. A Ratoncito Pérez was used by Colgate in marketing toothpaste in Venezuela and Spain. In Italy, the Tooth Fairy (Fatina) is also often replaced by a small mouse (topino), or by Saint Apollonia, patron saint of tooth complaints. In France and in French-speaking Belgium, this character is called la petite souris, 'The Little Mouse'. From parts of lowland Scotland comes a tradition similar to the fairy mouse: a white fairy rat who purchases the teeth with coins. In Afrikaans speaking families in South Africa, children leave their teeth in a shoe so that the Tandemuis (Tooth Mouse) can replace the teeth with money.

Several traditions concern throwing the shed teeth. In Turkey, Cyprus, and Greece, children traditionally throw their fallen baby teeth onto the roof of their house while making a wish. Similarly, in some Asian countries, such as India, Korea, Nepal, the Philippines, and Vietnam, when a child loses a tooth, the usual custom is that they should throw it onto the roof if it came from the lower jaw, or into the space beneath the floor if it came from the upper jaw. While doing this, the child shouts a request for the tooth to be replaced with the tooth of a mouse. This tradition is based on the fact that the teeth of mice grow for their entire lives, a characteristic of all rodents.

In Japan, a different variation calls for lost upper teeth to be thrown straight down to the ground and lower teeth straight up into the air or onto the roof of a house; the idea is that incoming teeth will grow in straight. Some parts of China follow a similar tradition by throwing the teeth from the lower jaw onto the roof and burying the teeth from the upper jaw underground, as a symbol of urging the permanent teeth to grow faster towards the right direction.

In Sri Lanka, tradition is to throw the baby teeth onto the roof or a tree in the presence of an Indian palm squirrel. The child then tells the squirrel to take the old tooth in return for a new one.

In some parts of India, young children offer their discarded baby teeth to the sun, sometimes wrapped in a tiny rag of cotton turf. In the Assam state of India, children throw their baby teeth to the roof of their house and urge a mouse to take it, to exchange with its teeth (permanent ones). Something similar occurs in the Dominican Republic where children will throw their baby teeth to the roof of a house with a thatched roof and ask a mouse to take it and replace it with a new (permanent) tooth (but not its own).

The tradition of throwing a baby tooth up into the sky to the sun playfully asking for a better tooth to replace it is common in Middle Eastern countries (including Iraq, Jordan, Egypt and Sudan). It may originate in a pre-Islamic offering and certainly dates back to at least the 13th century, when Izz bin Hibat Allah Al Hadid mentions it.

In 17th and again in 19th century Britain, lost teeth were commonly burnt to destroy them. This was partly for religious reasons connected with the Last Judgement and partly for fear of what might happen if an animal got them. A rhyme might be said as a blessing:

Old tooth, new tooth
Pray God send me a new tooth

In 1949, a Spike Jones novelty Christmas song All I Want for Christmas Is My Two Front Teeth became Billboard number-one single. The song was written in 1944 by Donald Yetter Gardner, who wrote it while teaching music at public schools in Smithtown, New York. He asked his second grade class what they wanted for Christmas, and noticed that almost all of the students had at least one front tooth missing as they answered in a lisp. Gardner wrote the song in 30 minutes. In a 1995 interview, Gardner said, "I was amazed at the way that silly little song was picked up by the whole country." The song was published in 1948 after an employee of Witmark music company heard Gardner sing it at a music teachers' conference.

== See also ==
- Permanent teeth
- Human tooth development
- Tooth eruption
- Tooth fairy
- Teething
- Dentition
