= Calcium silicate =

Chemical compound naturally occurring as the mineral larnite

Names
- Preferred IUPAC name Calcium silicate
- Systematic IUPAC name Dicalcium silicate
- Other names: Belite; Calcium monosilicate; Calcium hydrosilicate; Calcium metasilicate; Calcium orthosilicate; Micro-cell; Silene; Silicic acid calcium salt

Identifiers
CAS Number	1344-95-2; 111811-33-7 hydrate; 12168-85-3 calcium oxide
3D model (JSmol)	Interactive image
ChEBI	CHEBI:190294
ChemSpider	14235; 23811 calcium oxide
ECHA InfoCard	100.014.282
EC Number	235-336-9
E number	E552 (acidity regulators, ...)
KEGG	D03309
MeSH	Calcium+silicate
PubChem CID	14941; 44154858 hydrate; 25523 calcium oxide
UNII	S4255P4G5M; 404G39282C calcium oxide
CompTox Dashboard (EPA)	DTXSID5049570
- InChI: InChI=1S/2Ca.O4Si/c;;1-5(2,3)4/q2*+2;-4 Key: JHLNERQLKQQLRZ-UHFFFAOYSA-N
- SMILES: [Ca++].[Ca++].[O-][Si]([O-])([O-])[O-]

Properties
Chemical formula	Ca_{2}O_{4}Si
Molar mass	172.237 g·mol^{−1}
Appearance	White crystals
Density	2.9 g/cm^{3} (solid)
Melting point	2,130 °C (3,870 °F; 2,400 K)
Solubility in water	0.01% (20 °C)

Thermochemistry
Std molar entropy (S^{⦵}_{298})	84 J/(mol·K)
Std enthalpy of formation (Δ_{f}H^{⦵}_{298})	−1630 kJ/mol

Pharmacology
ATC code	A02AC02 (WHO)

Hazards
- Occupational safety and health (OHS/OSH)
Main hazards	Irritant
NFPA 704 (fire diamond)	2 0 0
Flash point	Not applicable
- NIOSH (US health exposure limits)
PEL (Permissible)	TWA 15 mg/m^{3} (total) TWA 5 mg/m^{3} (resp)
REL (Recommended)	TWA 10 mg/m^{3} (total) TWA 5 mg/m^{3} (resp)
IDLH (Immediate danger)	N.D.
- Safety data sheet (SDS)
- Except where otherwise noted, data are given for materials in their standard state (at 25 °C [77 °F], 100 kPa). verify (what is ?) Infobox references

Calcium silicate can refer to several silicates of calcium including:

- CaO·SiO_{2}, wollastonite (CaSiO_{3})
- 2CaO·SiO_{2}, larnite (Ca_{2}SiO_{4})
- 3CaO·SiO_{2}, alite or (Ca_{3}SiO_{5})
- 3CaO·2SiO_{2}, (Ca_{3}Si_{2}O_{7}).

This article focuses on Ca_{2}SiO_{4}, also known as calcium orthosilicate, or by the shortened trade name Cal-Sil/Calsil. All calcium silicates are white free-flowing powders. Being strong, cheap and nontoxic, they are components of important structural materials.

== Production and occurrence ==
Calcium silicates are produced by treating calcium oxide and silica in various ratios. Their formation is relevant to Portland cement.

Calcium silicate is a byproduct of the Pidgeon process, a major route to magnesium metal. The process converts a mixture of magnesium and calcium oxides as represented by the following simplified equation:

MgO·CaO +Si → 2 Mg + Ca_{2}SiO_{4}

The calcium oxide combines with silicon as the oxygen scavenger, yielding the very stable calcium silicate and releasing volatile (at high temperatures) magnesium metal.

Via the carbonate–silicate cycle, carbonate rocks convert into silicate rocks by metamorphism and volcanism and silicate rocks convert to carbonates by weathering and sedimentation.

The production of sulfuric acid from anhydrous calcium sulfate produces calcium silicates. Upon being mixed with shale or marl, and roasted at 1400 °C, the sulfate liberates sulfur dioxide gas, a precursor to sulfuric acid. The resulting calcium silicate is used in cement clinker production.

2 CaSO_{4} + 2 SiO_{2} + C → 2 CaSiO_{3} + 2 SO_{2} + CO_{2}

== Structure ==
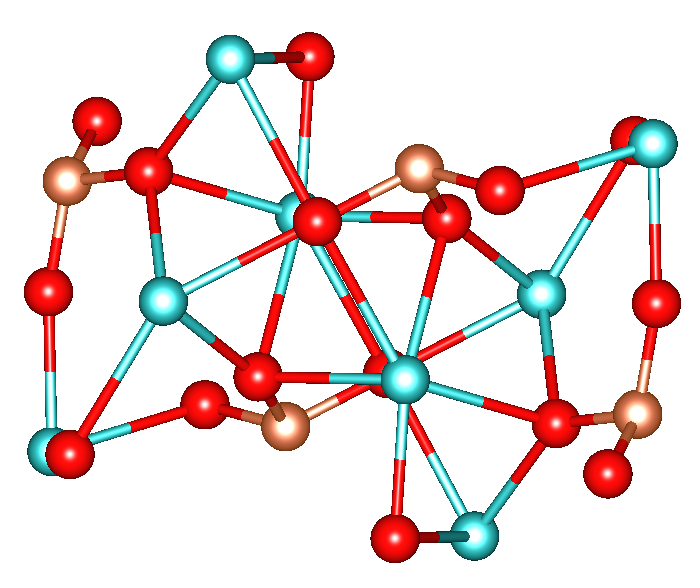
Unit cell of Ca_{2}SiO_{4}. Color code: red (O), blue (Ca), gold (Si).

As verified by X-ray crystallography, calcium silicate is a dense solid consisting of tetrahedral orthosilicate (SiO^{4−}_{4}) units linked to Ca^{2+} via Si−O−Ca bridges. There are two calcium sites. One is seven coordinate and the other is eight coordinate.

== Use ==
=== As a component of cement ===
Calcium silicates are the major ingredients in Portland cements.

Typical constituents of portland clinker plus gypsum showing cement chemist notation (CCN)
Clinker	CCN	Mass	Mineral
Tricalcium silicate (CaO)_{3} · SiO_{2}	C_{3}S	25–50%	alite
Dicalcium silicate (this article) (CaO)_{2} · SiO_{2}	C_{2}S	20–45%	belite
Tricalcium aluminate (CaO)_{3} · Al_{2}O_{3}	C_{3}A	5–12%	
Tetracalcium aluminoferrite (CaO)_{4} · Al_{2}O_{3} · Fe_{2}O_{3}	C_{4}AF	6–12%	
CaSO_{4} · 2 H_{2}O	CS̅H_{2}	2–10%	gypsum

=== High-temperature insulation ===
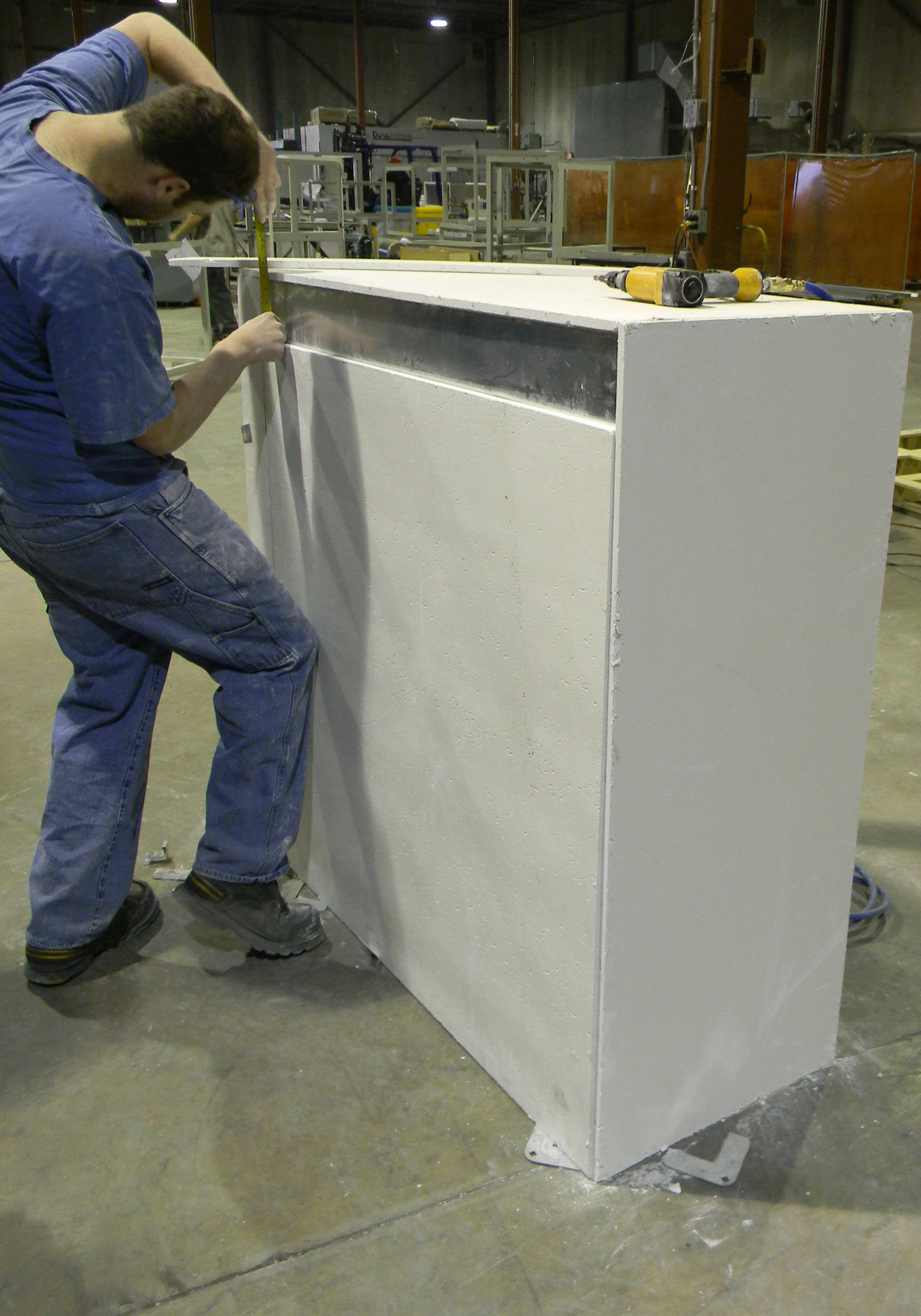
Calcium-silicate passive fire protection board being clad around steel structure in order to achieve a fire-resistance rating

Calcium silicate is commonly used as a safe alternative to asbestos for high-temperature insulation materials. Industrial-grade piping and equipment insulation is often fabricated from calcium silicate. Its fabrication is a routine part of the curriculum for insulation apprentices. Calcium silicate competes in these realms against rockwool and proprietary insulation solids, such as perlite mixture and vermiculite bonded with sodium silicate. Although it is popularly considered an asbestos substitute, early uses of calcium silicate for insulation still made use of asbestos fibers.

=== Passive fire protection ===
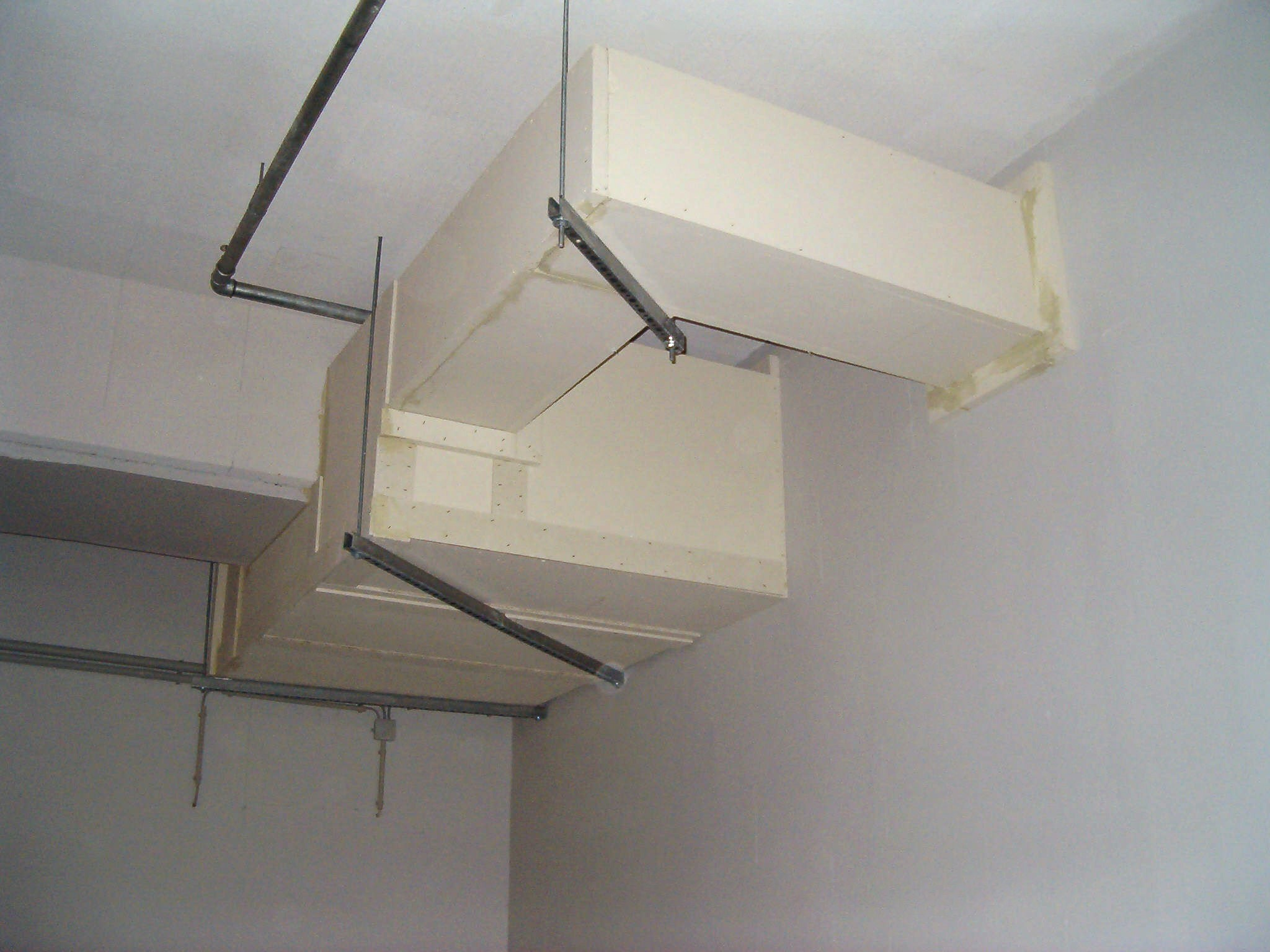
Circuit integrity fireproofing of cable trays in Lingen/Ems, Germany using calcium-silicate board system qualified to DIN 4102. Other methods for exterior protection of electrical circuits include boards made of sodium silicate, bonded and pressed vermiculite, and flexible wraps made of ceramic fibre and rockwool.

It is used in passive fire protection and fireproofing as calcium silicate brick or in roof tiles. It is one of the most successful materials in fireproofing in Europe because of regulations and fire safety guidelines for commercial and residential building codes. Where North Americans use spray fireproofing plasters, Europeans are more likely to use cladding made of calcium silicate. High-performance calcium-silicate boards retain their excellent dimensional stability even in damp and humid conditions and can be installed at an early stage in the construction program, before wet trades are completed and the building is weather-tight. For sub-standard products, silicone-treated sheets are available to fabricators to mitigate potential harm from high humidity or general presence of water. Fabricators and installers of calcium silicate in passive fire protection often also install firestops.

While the best possible reaction to fire classifications are A1 (construction applications) and A1Fl (flooring applications) respectively, both of which mean "non-combustible" according to EN 13501-1: 2007, as classified by a notified laboratory in Europe, some calcium-silicate boards only come with fire classification of A2 (limited combustibility) or even lower classifications (or no classification), if they are tested at all.

=== Acid mine drainage remediation ===
Calcium silicate, also known as slag, is produced when molten iron is made from iron ore, silicon dioxide and calcium carbonate in a blast furnace. When this material is processed into a highly refined, re-purposed calcium silicate aggregate, it is used in the remediation of acid mine drainage (AMD) on active and passive mine sites. Calcium silicate neutralizes active acidity in AMD systems by removing free hydrogen ions from the bulk solution, thereby increasing pH. As its silicate anion captures H^{+} ions (raising the pH), it forms monosilicic acid (H_{4}SiO_{4}), a neutral solute. Monosilicic acid remains in the bulk solution to play other important roles in correcting the adverse effects of acidic conditions. As opposed to limestone (a popular remediation material), calcium silicate effectively precipitates heavy metals and does not armor over, prolonging its effectiveness in AMD systems.

=== As a product of sealants ===
It is used as a sealant in roads or on the shells of fresh eggs: when sodium silicate is applied as a sealant to cured concrete or egg shells, it chemically reacts with calcium hydroxide or calcium carbonate to form calcium silicate hydrate, sealing micropores with a relatively impermeable material.

=== Agriculture ===
Calcium silicate is often used in agriculture as a plant available source of silicon. It is "applied extensively to Everglades mucks and associated sands planted to sugarcane and rice"

=== Other ===
Calcium silicate is used as an anticaking agent in food preparation, including table salt and as an antacid. It is approved by the United Nations' FAO and WHO bodies as a safe food additive in a large variety of products. It has the E number reference E552.

== See also ==
- Alite – Chemical compound
- Jaffeite – Sorosilicate mineral
- Plaster – Broad range of building and sculpture materials
- Perlite – Amorphous volcanic glass
- Vermiculite – Hydrous phyllosilicate mineral
- Brick#Calcium-silicate bricks – Block for masonry construction
