= Formocresol =

Mixture used in dental medicine

Formacresol is a mixture consisting of formalin, cresol and glycerine used in dentistry. It is used for vital pulpotomy of primary teeth and as a temporary intracanal medicament during root canal therapy.

Buckley's solution is a 20% form of formocresol, diluted with glycerine and distilled water.

The use of formocresol in pediatric dentistry has been deprecated, and ferric sulfate suggested as a substitute.
