= Alite =

Chemical compound

Alite is an impure form of tricalcium silicate, Ca_{3}SiO_{5}, sometimes formulated as 3CaO·SiO_{2} (C_{3}S in cement chemist notation), typically with 3-4% of substituent oxides. It is the major, and characteristic, phase in Portland cement. The name was given by Alfred Elis Törnebohm in 1897 to a crystal identified in microscopic investigation of Portland cement. Hatrurite is the name of a mineral that is substituted C_{3}S.

== Composition and structure ==
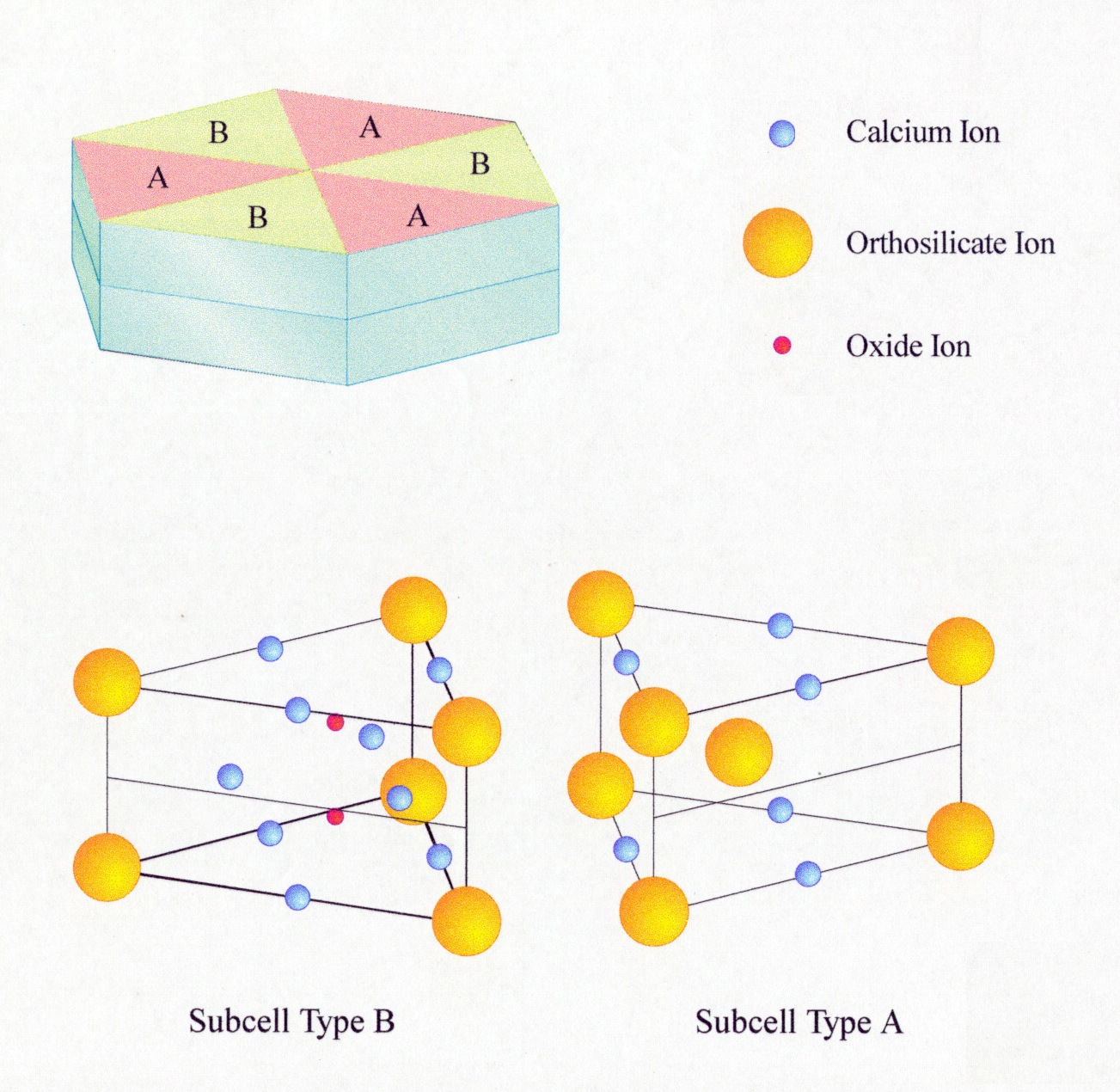
Simplified crystal structure of alite.

The alite found in Portland cement differs in composition from pure tricalcium silicate. It is a solid solution and contains minor amounts of other oxides besides CaO and SiO_{2}. A typical composition is:

| Oxide | Mass % |
|---|---|
| CaO | 71.6 |
| SiO_{2} | 25.2 |
| Al_{2}O_{3} | 1.0 |
| Fe_{2}O_{3} | 0.7 |
| MgO | 1.1 |
| Na_{2}O | 0.1 |
| K_{2}O | 0.1 |
| P_{2}O_{5} | 0.2 |

Based on this, the formula can be expressed as Ca_{2.90}Mg_{0.06}Na_{0.01}Fe_{0.03}Al_{0.04}Si_{0.95}P_{0.01}O_{5}. In practice, the composition varies with the bulk composition of the clinker, subject to certain limits. Substitution of calcium ions or orthosilicate ions requires that electric charges be kept in balance. For instance, a limited number of orthosilicate (SiO^{4−}_{4}) ions can be replaced with sulfate (SO^{2−}_{4}) ions, provided that for each sulfate ion, two aluminate (AlO^{5−}_{4}) ions are also substituted.

== Polymorphs ==
Tricalcium silicate is thermodynamically unstable below 1250°C, but can be preserved in a metastable state at room temperature by fast cooling; on slow cooling it tends to revert to belite (Ca_{2}SiO_{4}) and CaO.

As the temperature changes, it passes through several polymorphic states:

| Temp (°C) | Name | Crystal |
|---|---|---|
| >1070 | R | Rhombohedral |
| 1060-1070 | M_{3} | Monoclinic |
| 990-1060 | M_{2} | Monoclinic |
| 980-990 | M_{1} | Monoclinic |
| 920-980 | T_{3} | Triclinic |
| 620-920 | T_{2} | Triclinic |
| <620 | T_{1} | Triclinic |

The polymorphs differ structurally by minor deformations from the basic hexagonal structure.

== Hydration steps ==
Alite is the major phase in Portland cement responsible for setting and development of "early" strength. The other silicate, belite contributes "late" strength, due to its lower reactivity. Alite is more reactive because of its higher Ca content, and the presence of an oxide ion in the lattice. During clinker grinding, first step of partial dissolution of C_{3}S involves hydration of superficial oxide ions and leads to a hydroxylated C_{3}S surface.

3Ca^{+}_{2} + SiO^{4−}_{4} + O^{2−} + H_{2}O → 3Ca^{2+} + SiO^{4−}_{4} + 2OH^{−}

It reacts with water (roughly) according to the reaction:

2Ca_{3}SiO_{5} + 6H_{2}O → 3CaO·2SiO_{2}·3H_{2}O + 3Ca(OH)_{2}

Which can also be written in the cement chemist notation as:

2C_{3}S + 6H → C_{3}S_{2}H_{3} + 3CH

+ 6H_{2}O → C-S-H +

The main hydrate is referred to as the calcium silicate hydrate –"C-S-H"–gel. It grows within interlocking needles, and provides the strength of the hydrated cement system. High alite reactivity is desirable in Portland cement manufacture, and this is achieved by retaining, as far as possible, high temperature polymorphs, in crystals that are small, distorted and highly defective. Defects provide sites for initial water attack.

== Alite as precursor of silicate phases found in medieval lime mortar ==
The composition of alite rich in CaO (71.6 wt.%) and relatively poor in SiO_{2} (25.2 wt.%) (see the hereabove table) may help to understand why in particular conditions, if a sufficiently high temperature is reached in a lime kiln during enough time, alite can also be directly formed by pyrolizing only siliceous limestone (containing amorphous SiO_{2} impurities up to 25-30 wt.%). Hydraulic mortar or pre-Portland cement may have been occasionally produced on a small scale in this way during the medieval epoch in locations where limestone was cemented by amorphous silica or contained chert nodules or a lot of clay impurities.

This is likely the reason why some old medieval lime mortars used to build the Tournai cathedral (Belgium) exhibit an unexpected hydraulic character as revealed by a mineralogical study made by Mertens et al. (2006) who evidenced the presence of wollastonite and rankinite along with calcium silicate hydrate phases in lime mortars. The only explanation for the discovery of these silicate phases not normally expected in lime mortar is that they have been formed by the hydration of calcium silicate such as Ca_{3}SiO_{5} (C_{3}S) or Ca_{2}SiO_{4} (C_{2}S) formed at high temperature along calcium oxide in the lime kiln. In the area of Tournai (Belgium), the Tournaisian limestones are particularly rich in amorphous silica and exploited as building stone and for making lime mortar since very ancient ages. It is unknown if the cathedral builders of this area were aware of the hydraulic properties of their lime mortar or intentionally developed its use after their fortuitous finding.

== Detection ==
See the article on belite.

== See also ==
- Cement kiln – High temperature rotating oven used for producing clinker
- Cement chemist notation – Abbreviated notation for chemical formulas of common oxides
