= Energetically modified cement =

Class of cements, mechanically processed to transform reactivity

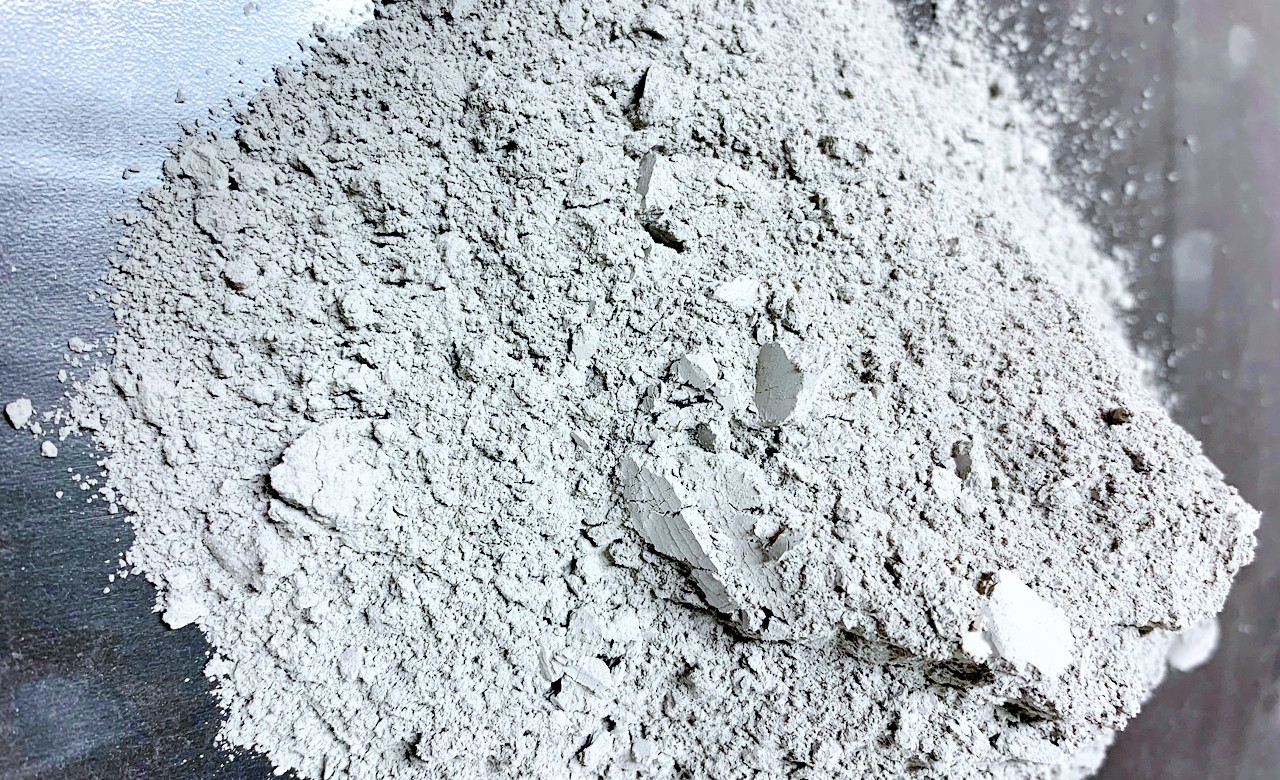
An EMC made from volcanic rocks (Luleå, Sweden, 2020)

Energetically modified cements (EMCs) are a class of cements made from pozzolans (e.g. fly ash, volcanic ash, pozzolana), silica sand, blast furnace slag, or Portland cement (or blends of these ingredients). The term "energetically modified" arises by virtue of the mechanochemistry process applied to the raw material, more accurately classified as "high energy ball milling" (HEBM). At its simplest this means a milling method that invokes high kinetics by subjecting "powders to the repeated action of hitting balls" as compared to (say) the low kinetics of rotating ball mills. This causes, amongst others, a thermodynamic transformation in the material to increase its chemical reactivity. For EMCs, the HEBM process used is a unique form of specialised vibratory milling discovered in Sweden and applied only to cementitious materials, here called "EMC Activation".

By improving the reactivity of pozzolans, their strength-development rate is increased. This allows for compliance with modern product-performance requirements ("technical standards") for concretes and mortars. In turn, this allows for the replacement of Portland cement in the concrete and mortar mixes. This has a number of benefits to their long-term qualities.

Energetically modified cements have a wide range of uses. For example, EMCs have been used in concretes for large infrastructure projects in the United States, meeting U.S. concrete standards.

== Justification ==
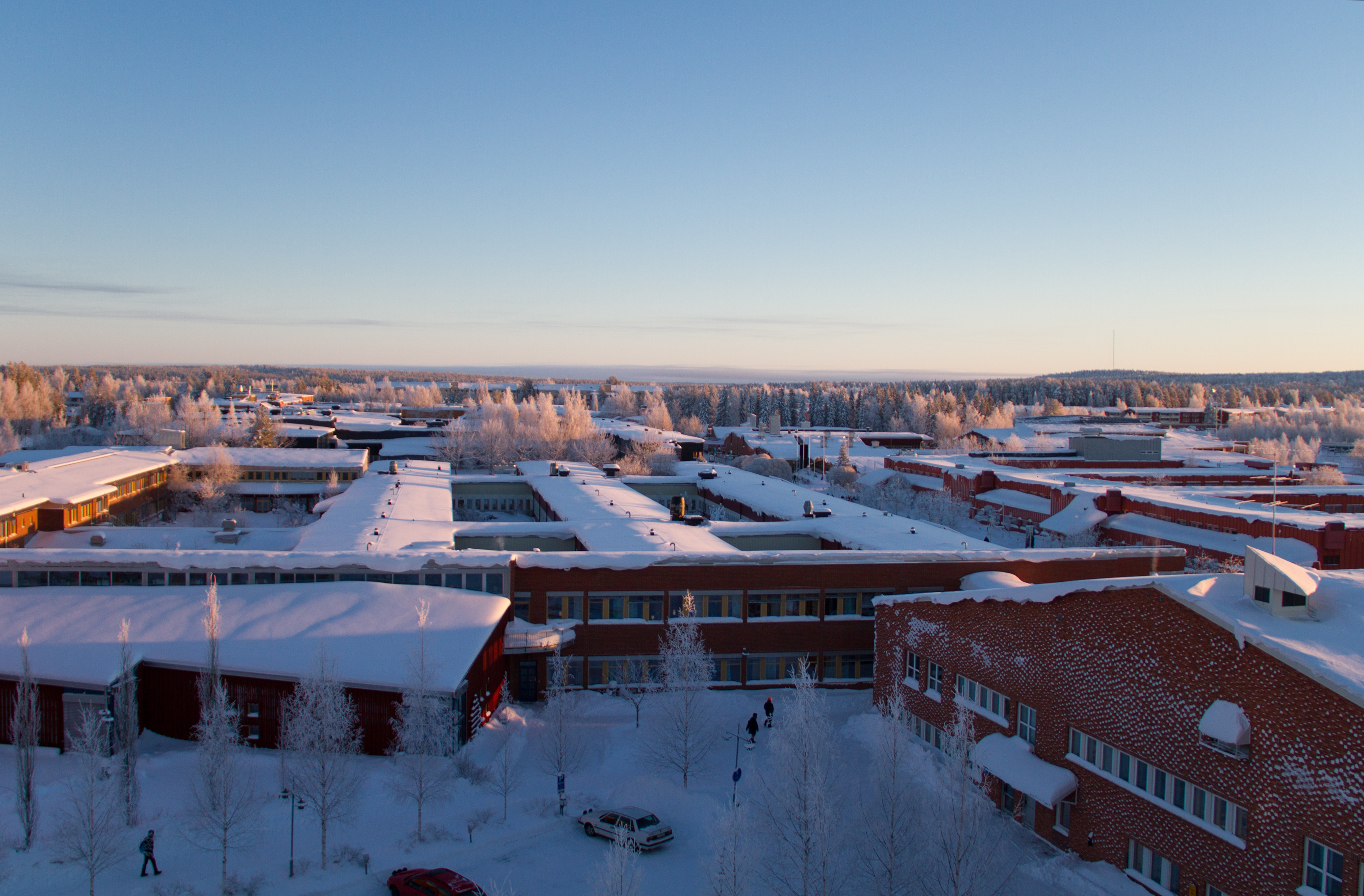
Luleå University of Technology (LTU) campus in Luleå, Sweden

The term "energetically modified cement" incorporates a simple thermodynamic descriptor to refer to a class of cements produced using a specialised highly intensive milling process first discovered in 1992 at Luleå University of Technology (LTU) in Sweden. The transformatory process is initiated entirely mechanically as opposed to heating the materials directly. The mechanisms of mechanochemical transformations are often complex and different from "traditional" thermal or photochemical mechanisms. HEBM can transform both the physical and thermodynamic properties that for example, "can lead to glass formation from elemental powder mixtures as well as by amorphization of intermetallic compound powders". The effects of HEBM-transformation cause a thermodynamic change that resides ultimately in a modified Gibbs Energy. The process increases the binding capacity and chemical reactivity rates of the materials transformed.

Continuing academic work and research regarding "self-healing" properties of energetically modified cements is ongoing at LTU. For example, EMCs has received awards from the Elsa ō Sven Thysells stiftelse för konstruktionsteknisk forskning (Elsa & Sven Thysell Foundation for Construction Engineering Research) of Sweden. The contribution of EMCs to the domain of mechanochemistry itself has also been recognised.

== Etymology ==
The term "energetically modified cement" was first used in 1992 by Vladimir Ronin, introduced in a paper by Ronin et al. dated 1993 and presented at a formal meeting of the academic Nordic Concrete Research group. The process was refined by Ronin and others, including Lennart Elfgren (now Professor Emeritus of LTU, Department of Civil, Environmental and Natural Resources Engineering). In 2023, LTU awarded Elfgren the "Vice-Chancellor's Medal for Merit for outstanding and meritorious work" by virtue of his work "...for the spread of new knowledge and understanding of, in particular, the concrete construction field".

At the 45th World Exhibition of Invention, Research and Innovation, held in 1996 in Brussels, Belgium, EMC Activation was awarded a gold medal with mention by EUREKA, the European inter-governmental (research and development) organisation, for "modification énergique de ciments".

The term "energetically modified" has been used elsewhere—for example as recently as 2017—although such usage does not denote the method used was EMC Activation as defined here.

== Overview ==
The claims made include:

- An EMC is a fine powder (typical of all cements) whose colour depends on the material processed.
- EMCs are produced using only a "fraction" of the energy used in Portland cement production (claimed ~100 KWh/tonne, <8% of Portland cement).
- No CO_{2} is released by the process. It is "zero emissions".
- The purpose of an EMC is to replace the Portland cement requirement in the mortar or concrete being used. More than 70% replacement is claimed.
- EMC Activation is a dry process.
- No noxious fumes are released.
- EMC Activation is a low-temperature process, even though temperatures can be "momentarily extreme" at "sub-micron" scales.
- EMCs require no chemicals for their thermodynamic transformation.
- There are several types of EMCs, depending on the raw materials transformed.
- Depending on user-requirements, delivered dry products may comprise also a minority proportion of "high clinker" Portland cement.
- Each type of EMC has its own performance characteristics, including mechanical load and strength development. Concretes cast from EMCs may yield significant "self-healing" capabilities.
- The most frequently used EMCs are made from fly ash and natural pozzolans. These are relatively abundant materials, and the performance characteristics can exceed those of Portland cement.
- In 2009, fly ash EMCs were demonstrated to exceed the 'Grade 120 Slag' benchmark per ASTM C989 — the most reactive form of cementitious blast furnace slag.
- Silica sand and granite can also be treated by the process to replace Portland cement. As regards the former, 2025 testing of cores from a long-term structural installation showed a 27-year strength gain of 8% in a harsh sub-arctic climate (see section on "Early usage in Sweden", below).
- EMC products have been extensively tested by independent labs and certified for use by several US DOTs including in Federal Highway Administration projects.
- EMCs comply with respective technical standards, such as ASTM C618-19 (U.S.); EN-197, EN-206 and EN 450-1:2012 (CEN territories, including EEA); BS 8615‑1:2019 (U.K.).
- Compared to using Portland cement, the resulting concrete-mix using EMC does not require a higher "total cementitious content" to meet strength-development requirements.
- In testing by BASF, the 28-day strength-development for 55% replacement of Portland cement by a natural pozzolanic EMC was 14,000 psi / 96.5 MPa (i.e. > C95). This comprised a "total cementitious content" of 335 kg/m^3 (564 lbs/CY) concrete mix.

== EMCs as "low carbon" cements ==
Unlike Portland Cement, an EMC's production releases no carbon dioxide whatsoever. This makes EMCs "low carbon cements".

The first cited claims for EMC's CO_{2}-reduction capabilities were made in 1999, when worldwide Portland cement production stood at 1.6 billion tonnes per year. From 2011 to 2019, worldwide Portland cement production increased from 3.6 to 4.1 billion tonnes per year. (Note: Two aspects: (I) 2011 Global Portland cement production was approximately 3.6 billion tonnes per United States Geological Survey (USGS) (2013) data, and is binding as a reasonably accurate assimilation, rather than an estimate per se. Note also, that by the same report, for 2012 it was estimated that Global Portland cement production would increase to 3.7 billion tonnes (a 100 million tonne increase, year-on-year), when in fact the actual figure for 2012 was 3.8 billion tonnes. (II) 2011 Estimate of Global total CO_{2} production: 33.376 billion tonnes (without international transport). Source: E.U. European Commission, Joint Research Centre (JRC)/PBL Netherlands Environmental Assessment Agency. Emission Database for Global Atmospheric Research (EDGAR), release version 4.2. The 2009–2011 trends were estimated for energy-related sectors based on fossil fuel consumption for 2009–2011 from the BP Review of World Energy 2011 (BP, 2012), for cement production based on preliminary data from USGS (2012), except for China for which use was made of National Bureau of Statistics of China (NBS) (2009, 2010, 2011). [As of May 2013. See, EDGAR, external link section].) Energetically modified cement's potential for contributing to a worldwide reduction of CO_{2} has been externally recognised since 2002 and has been ongoing. Recent recognition has included the 2019 Energy Transitions Commission (Lord Adair Turner and Lord Stern) report Mission Possible sectoral focus: cement (2019). Recognition of the "Zero-Carbon" potential was set out by McKinsey & Co in its 2020 report Laying the foundation for zero-carbon cement. In 2023, the contribution offered by EMCs in achieving "low carbon" materials was further acknowledged within the academic domain of mechanochemistry.

== Production and field-usage ==
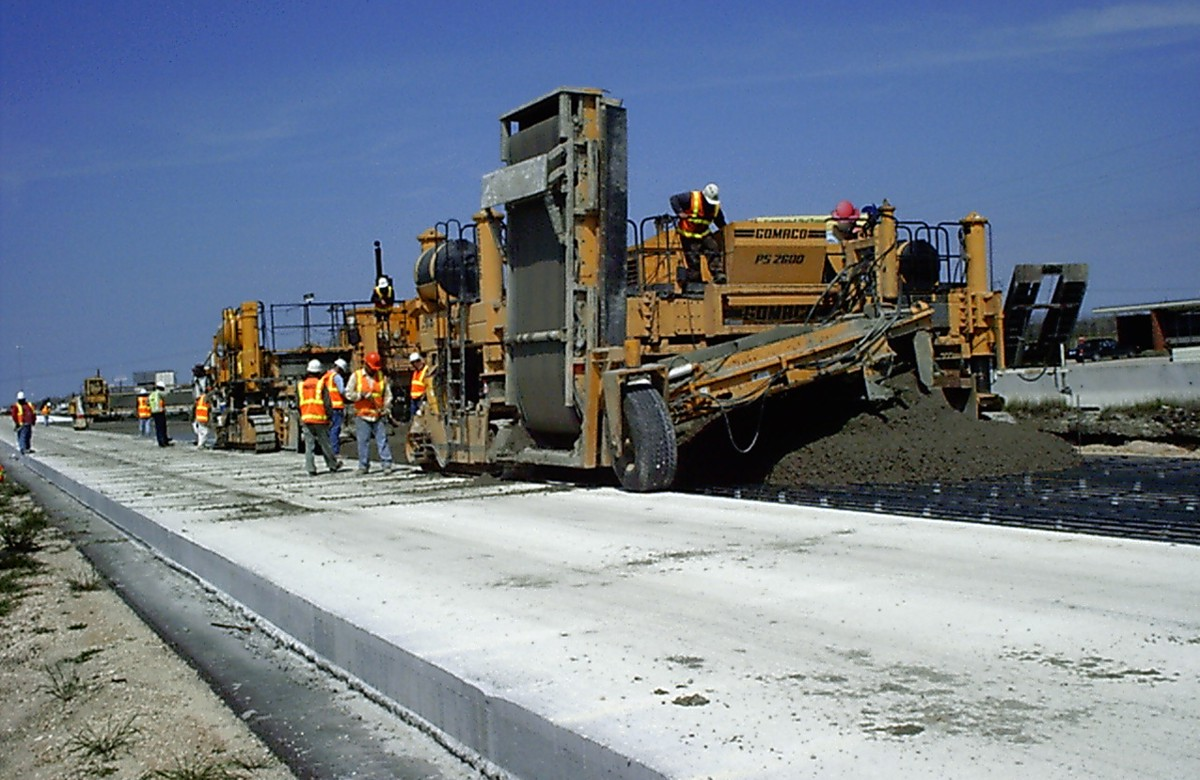
Application of EMC on IH-10 (Interstate Highway), Texas, United States.

=== No noxious emissions or toxic chemicals during production ===
EMC Activation is purely a mechanical process. As such, it does not involve heating or burning or indeed any chemical treatments. This means no fumes at all are produced during an EMC's manufacture.

=== History ===
EMCs have been produced for project usage since 1992 for a wide range of uses. By 2010, the volume of concrete poured containing EMCs was about 4,500,000 cu yd (3,440,496 m^{3}), largely on US DOT projects. To place this into context, that is more than the entire construction of the Hoover Dam, its associated power plants and appurtenant works, where a total of 4,360,000 cu·yds (3,333,459 m^{3}) of concrete was poured—equivalent to a U.S. standard highway from San Francisco to New York City.

==== Early usage in Sweden using EMC Activated silica sand (subarctic road bridge) ====
An early project used a concrete comprising a 50% Portland cement substitution using a silica sand EMC (i.e. activated sand). This was deployed for the construction of a road bridge in Karungi, Sweden, in 1998, with Swedish construction firm Skanska. The Karungi road bridge has withstood Karungi's harsh subarctic climate and divergent annual and diurnal temperature ranges. Core testing in 2025 in partnership with Luleå University of Technology (LTU), Skanska and the Swedish Transport Administration demonstrated that the "mean compressive strength was 71.3 MPa, representing an 8 % increase compared with the 28-day strength. The concrete was in excellent condition, exhibiting only minor shrinkage cracks up to 0.3 mm wide", and that:

"These results confirm the long-term durability of the EMC concrete and demonstrate that mechanically activated local quartz fines can reduce cement-related carbon emissions by approximately 50%, while still providing higher long-term strength after more than 25 years in a harsh sub-Arctic climate."

==== Usage in the United States ====
In the United States, energetically modified cements have been approved for usage by a number of state transportation agencies, including PennDOT, TxDOT and Caltrans.

In the United States, highway bridges and hundreds of miles of highway paving have been constructed using concretes made from EMC derived from fly ash. These projects include sections of Interstate 10. In these projects, EMC replaced at least 50% of the Portland cement in the concrete poured. This is about 2.5 times more than the typical amount of fly ash in projects where energetic modification is not used. Independent test data showed 28-day strength-development requirements were exceeded in all projects. In 2009, fly ash EMCs were demonstrated to exceed the 'Grade 120 Slag' benchmark per ASTM C989.

Another project was the extension of the passenger terminals at the Port of Houston, Texas, where energetically modified cement's ability to yield concretes that exhibit high resistances to chloride– and sulphate–ion permeability (i.e., increased resistance to seawater) was a factor.

==== Developments in 2024 ====
In February 2024 it was jointly announced that a manufacturing plant for EMCs made from volcanic materials will be jointly developed by "EMC Cement" and HES International at the Port of Amsterdam, and further, that the "all-electric zero-emissions plant, of an initial capacity of 1.2 million tonnes, will cut CO2 emissions by 1 million tonnes annually — using less than 10% of the energy of a conventional Portland cement plant".

== Properties of concretes and mortars made from EMCs ==
Diagram: "Bache method" for testing concrete durability. (Note: The "Bache method" for testing concrete durability simulates daily temperature variations in brine. Test 1 or Test 2 may be used, or performed sequentially over 48hrs. The method induces saturation by 7.5% salt water (i.e., higher concentration than sea waters), followed by freezing or heating in a 24-hour cycle to simulate high diurnal temperature ranges. The chosen cycle is repeated ad nausem to determine the mass-loss. Hence, the Bache method is generally accepted as one of the most severe testing procedures for concrete as an analogue for durability.)

=== Custom design for end-usage ===
The performance of mortars and concretes made from EMCs can be custom-designed. For example, EMC concretes can range from general application (for strength and durability) through to the production of rapid and ultra-rapid hardening high-strength concretes (for example, over 70 MPa / 10,150 psi in 24 hours and over 200 MPa / 29,000 psi in 28 days). This allows energetically modified cements to yield High Performance Concretes.

=== Durability of EMC concretes and mortars ===
Any cementitious material undergoing EMC Activation will likely marshal improved durability—including Portland cement treated with EMC Activation. As regards pozzolanic EMCs, concretes made from pozzolanic EMCs are more durable than concretes made from Portland cement.

Treating Portland cement with EMC activation will yield high-performance concretes (HPCs). These HPCs will be high strength, highly durable, and exhibiting greater strength-development in contrast to HPCs made from untreated Portland cement. Treating Portland cement with the EMC Activation process may increase the strength development by nearly 50% and also significantly improve the durability, as measured according to generally accepted methods.

=== Enhanced resistance to saltwater attack ===
Concrete made from ordinary Portland cement without additives has a relatively impaired resistance to saltwater. In contrast, EMCs exhibit high resistances to chloride and sulphate ion attack, together with low alkali-silica reactivities (ASR). For example, durability tests have been performed according to the "Bache method" (see diagram). Samples made of HPC having respective compressive strengths of 180.3 and 128.4 MPa (26,150 and 18,622 psi) after 28 days of curing, were then tested using the Bache method. The samples were made of (a) EMC (comprising Portland cement and silica fume both having undergone EMC Activation) and (b) Portland cement. The resulting mass-loss was plotted in order to determine durability. As a comparison, the test results showed:

- Whereas the reference Portland cement concrete had "total destruction after about 16 Bache method cycles, in line with Bache's own observations for high-strength concrete";
- EMC high performance concrete showed a "consistent high-level durability" throughout the entire testing period of 80 Bache cycles, with for example, "practically no scaling of the concrete has been observed".

In other words, treating Portland cement with the EMC Activation process, may increase the strength development by nearly 50% and also significantly improve the durability, as measured according to generally accepted methods.

=== Low leachability of EMC Concretes ===
Leachability tests were performed by LTU in 2001 in Sweden, on behalf of a Swedish power production company, on concrete made from an EMC made from fly ash. These tests confirmed that the cast concrete "showed a low surface specific leachability" with respect to "all environmentally relevant metals."

== EMCs using Pozzolans such as volcanic materials ==
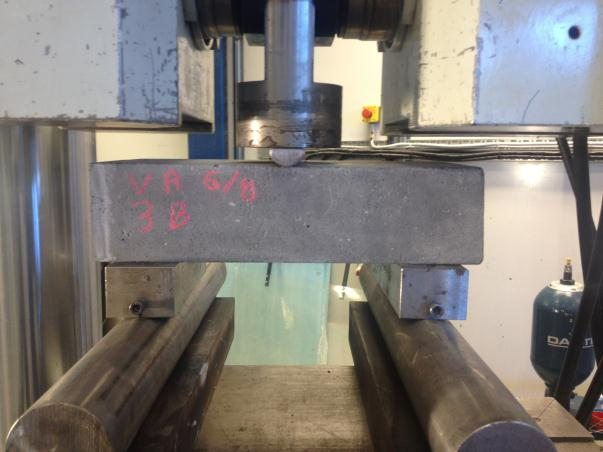
Demonstrating an EMC's "self-healing" propensity... PHOTO A PHOTO B Without intervention, cracks were totally self-filled after 4.5 months (Note: The large photo depicts a concrete test-beam made from an EMC undergoing RILEM 3-point bending at Luleå University of Technology in Sweden (Feb., 2013). This treatment induces cracks to test for "self-healing" propensities. Concrete (total cmt: 350 kg/m³) containing 40% Portland cement and 60% EMC made from fly ash was used. PHOTO A: Cracks of average width 150-200 μm were induced after circa 3-weeks' water-curing. PHOTO B: Without any intervention, the high volume pozzolan concrete exhibited the gradual filling-in of the cracks with newly-synthesized CSH gel (a product of the ongoing pozzolanic reaction). These were completely filled-in after ~4.5 months. During the observation period, continuous strength-development was also recorded by virtue of the ongoing pozzolanic reaction. This, together with the observed "self healing" properties, have a positive impact on concrete durability. All photos Dr. V. Ronin and The Nordic Concrete Federation.)

=== Self-healing properties of pozzolanic EMCs ===
Natural pozzolanic reactions can cause mortars and concretes containing these materials to "self-heal". The EMC Activation process can increase the likelihood of the occurrence of these pozzolanic reactions. The same tendency been noted and studied in the various supporting structures of Hagia Sophia built for the Byzantine emperor Justinian (now, Istanbul, Turkey). There, in common with most Roman cements, mortars comprising high amounts of pozzolana were used — in order to give what was thought to be an increased resistance to the stress-effects caused by earthquakes.

EMCs made from pozzolanic materials exhibit "biomimetic" self-healing capabilities that can be photographed as they develop (see picture insert).

=== EMCs using California pozzolans ===
Concretes made by replacing at least 50% of the Portland cement with EMCs have yielded consistent field results in high-volume applications. This is also the case for EMC made from natural pozzolans (e.g., volcanic ash).

Volcanic ash deposits from Southern California were independently tested; at 50% Portland cement replacement, the resulting concretes exceeded the requirements of the relevant US standard. At 28 days, the compressive strength was 4,180 psi / 28.8 MPa (N/mm²). The 56-day strength exceeded the requirements for 4,500 psi (31.1 MPa) concrete, even taking into account the safety margin as recommended by the American Concrete Institute. The concrete made in this way was workable and sufficiently strong, exceeding the 75% standard of pozzolanic activity at both 7 days and 28 days. The surface smoothness of pozzolans in the concrete was also increased.

=== Effect on pozzolanic reactions ===
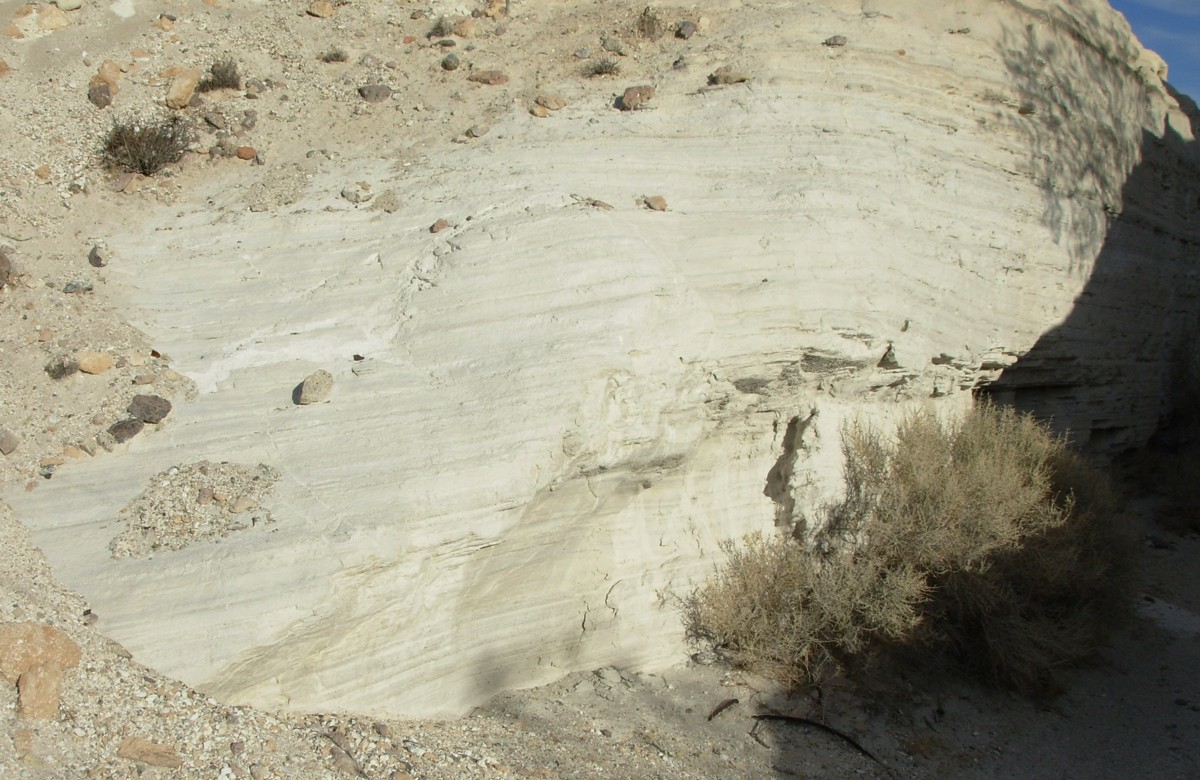
Volcanic ash deposits situated in Southern California, USA.

EMC Activation is a process that increases a pozzolan's chemical affinity for pozzolanic reactions. This leads to faster and greater strength development of the resulting concrete, at higher replacement ratios, than untreated pozzolans. These transformed (now highly reactive pozzolans) demonstrate further benefits using known pozzolanic reaction-pathways that typically see as their end-goal a range of hydrated products. An NMR study on EMCs concluded that EMC Activation caused "the formation of thin SiO_{2} layers around C3S crystals", which in turn, "accelerates the pozzolanic reaction and promotes growing of more extensive nets of the hydrated products".

In simple terms, by using pozzolans in concrete, porous (reactive) Portlandite can be transformed into hard and impermeable (relatively non-reactive) compounds, rather than the porous and soft relatively reactive calcium carbonate produced using ordinary cement. Many of the end products of pozzolanic chemistry exhibit a hardness greater than 7.0 on the Mohs scale."Self healing" capabilities may also contribute to enhanced field-application durabilities where mechanical stresses may be present.

In greater detail, the benefits of pozzolanic concrete, starts with an understanding that in concrete (including concretes with EMCs), Portland cement combines with water to produce a stone-like material through a complex series of chemical reactions, whose mechanisms are still not fully understood. That chemical process, called mineral hydration, forms two cementing compounds in the concrete: calcium silicate hydrate (C-S-H) and calcium hydroxide (Ca(OH)_{2}). This reaction can be noted in three ways, as follows:

- Standard notation: $\ce{Ca3SiO5 + H2O -> (CaO) * (SiO2) * (H2O) + Ca(OH)2}$

- Balanced: $\ce{2Ca3SiO5 + 7H2O -> 3CaO * 2SiO2 * 4H2O + 3Ca(OH)2}$

- Cement chemist notation (the hyphenation denotes the variable stoichiometry): C_{3}S + H → C-S-H + CH

The underlying hydration reaction forms two products:

1. Calcium silicate hydrate (C-S-H), which gives concrete its strength and dimensional stability. The crystal structure of C-S-H in cement paste has not been fully resolved yet and there is still ongoing debate over its nanostructure.
2. Calcium hydroxide (Ca(OH)_{2}), which in concrete chemistry is known also as Portlandite. In comparison to calcium silicate hydrate, Portlandite is relatively porous, permeable and soft (2 to 3, on Mohs scale). It is also sectile, with flexible cleavage flakes. Portlandite is soluble in water, to yield an alkaline solution which can compromise a concrete's resistance to acidic attack.

Portlandite makes up about 25% of concrete made with Portland cement without pozzolanic cementitious materials. In this type of concrete, carbon dioxide is slowly absorbed to convert the Portlandite into insoluble calcium carbonate (CaCO_{3}), in a process called carbonatation:

$$\ce{Ca(OH)2 + CO2 -> CaCO3 + H2O}$$

In mineral form, calcium carbonate can exhibit a wide range of hardness depending on how it is formed. At its softest, calcium carbonate can form in concrete as chalk (of hardness 1.0 on Mohs scale). Like Portlandite, calcium carbonate in mineral form can also be porous, permeable and with a poor resistance to acid attack, which causes it to release carbon dioxide.

Pozzolanic concretes, including EMCs, however, continue to consume the soft and porous Portlandite as the hydration process continues, turning it into additional hardened concrete as calcium silicate hydrate (C-S-H) rather than calcium carbonate. This results in a denser, less permeable and more durable concrete. This reaction is an acid-base reaction between Portlandite and silicic acid (H_{4}SiO_{4}) that may be represented as follows:

$\ce{Ca(OH)2 + H4SiO4 -> Ca^2+ + H2SiO4^2- + 2H2O -> CaH2SiO4 * 2H2O}$ (Note: Further notes on pozzolanic chemistry: (A) The ratio Ca/Si (or C/S) and the number of water molecules can vary, to vary C-S-H stoichiometry. (B) Often, crystalline hydrates are formed for example when tricalcium aluminiate reacts with dissolved calcium sulphate to form crystalline hydrates (3CaO·(Al,Fe)_{2}O_{3}·CaSO_{4}·nH_{2}O, general simplified formula). This is called an AFm ("alumina, ferric oxide, monosulphate") phase. (C) The AFm phase per se is not exclusive. On the one hand while sulphates, together with other anions such as carbonates or chlorides can add to the AFm phase, they can also cause an AFt phase where ettringite is formed (6CaO·Al_{2}O_{3}·3SO_{3}·32H_{2}O or C_{6}S̅_{3}H_{32}). (D) Generally, the AFm phase is important in the further hydration process, whereas the AFt phase can be the cause of concrete failure known as DEF. DEF can be a particular problem in non-pozzolanic concretes (see, for ex., Folliard, K., et al., Preventing ASR/DEF in New Concrete: Final Report, TXDOT & U.S. FHWA:Doc. FHWA/TX-06/0-4085-5, Rev. 06/2006). (E) It is thought that pozzolanic chemical pathways utilising Ca^{2+} ions cause the AFt route to be relatively suppressed.)

Further, many pozzolans contain aluminate (Al(OH)_{4}^{−}) that will react with Portlandite and water to form:

- calcium aluminate hydrates, such as calcium aluminium garnet (hydrogrossular: C_{4}AH_{13} or C_{3}AH_{6} in cement chemist notation, hardness 7.0 to 7.5 on Mohs scale); or
- in combination with silica, to form strätlingite (Ca_{2}Al_{2}SiO_{7}·8H_{2}O or C_{2}ASH_{8} in cement chemist notation), which geologically can form as xenoliths in basalt as metamorphosed limestone.

Pozzolanic cement chemistry (along with high-aluminate cement chemistry) is complex and per se is not constrained by the foregoing pathways. For example, strätlingite can be formed in a number of ways, including per the following equation which can add to a concrete's strength:

C_{2}AH_{8} + 2CSH + AH_{3} + 3H → C_{2}ASH_{8} (cement chemist notation)

The role of pozzolans in a concrete's chemistry is not fully understood. For example, strätlingite is metastable, which in a high temperature and water-content environment (that can be generated during the early curing stages of concrete) may of itself yield stable calcium aluminium garnet (see first bullet point above). This can be represented per the following equation:

3C_{2}AH_{8} → 2C_{3}AH_{6} + AH_{3} + 9H (cement chemist notation)

Per the first bullet point, although the inclusion of calcium aluminium garnet per se is not problematic, if it is instead produced by the foregoing pathway, then micro-cracking and strength-loss can occur in the concrete. However, adding high-reactivity pozzolans into the concrete mix prevents such a conversion reaction. In sum, whereas pozzolans provide a number of chemical pathways to form hardened materials, "high-reactivity" pozzolans such as blast furnace slag (GGBFS) can also stabilise certain pathways. In this context, EMCs made from fly ash have been demonstrated to produce concretes that meet the same characteristics as concretes comprising "120 Slag" (i.e., GGBFS) according to U.S. standard ASTM C989.

Portlandite, when exposed to low temperatures, moist conditions and condensation, can react with sulphate ions to cause efflorescence. In contrast, pozzolanic chemistry reduces the amount of Portlandite available, to reduce the proliferation of efflorescence.

== EMC Activation ==
Amorphisation: A depiction the moment of impact during HEBM.

EMC Activation's purpose is to cause a fundamental destruction to the crystalline structure of the material processed, to render it amorphous. Although this change increases the processed material's chemical reactivity, no chemical reaction is caused during the EMC Activation process.

At its simplest, mechanochemistry can be stated as "a field studying chemical reactions initiated or accelerated by the direct absorption of mechanical energy." More technically, it can be defined as a branch of chemistry concerned with the "chemical and physico-chemical transformation of substances in all states of aggregation produced by the effect of mechanical energy." IUPAC carries no standard definition of the term mechanochemistry, instead defining a "mechanochemical reaction" as a chemical reaction "induced by the direct absorption of mechanical energy", while noting, "shearing, stretching, and grinding are typical methods for the mechano-chemical generation of reactive sites".

More narrowly, "mechanical activation" was a term first defined in 1942 as a process "involving an increase in reaction ability of a substance which remains chemically unchanged." Even more narrowly, EMC Activation is a specialised form of mechanical activation limited to the application of high energy ball milling (HEBM) to cementitious materials. More narrowly than that, EMC Activation uses vibratory milling, and even then, only by using its own grinding media. As stated in a 2023 academic textbook limited to mechanochemistry, EMC Activation has "impressively demonstrated" its effects in causing a change to the reactivity of alternate cement material and the resulting physical characteristics of the concrete cast.

=== Thermodynamic justification ===
More particularly, HEBM can be described as increasing the chemical reactivity of a material by increasing its chemical potential energy. In EMC Activation, transferred mechanical energy is stored in the material as lattice defects caused by destroying the material's crystalline structure. Hence, the process transforms solid substances into thermodynamically and structurally more unstable states, allowing an explanation for that increased reactivity as an increase in Gibbs energy:

$\Delta G = G_T^* - G_T$ where, for temperature $T$, the terms $G_T^*$ and $G_T$ are the respective Gibbs values in the processed and unprocessed material.

At its simplest, HEBM causes the destruction of crystalline bonds, to increase a material's reactivity. From the thermodynamic perspective, any subsequent chemical reaction can decrease the excess energy level in the activated-material (i.e. as a reactant) to produce new components comprising both a lower chemical energy and a more stable physical structure. Conversely, to render the pre-processed material into a more reactive physical state, the disordering process during the HEBM process can be justified as being equivalent to a decrystallisation (and hence an entropy increase) that in part yields a volume increase (decrease of bulk density). A reverse process, sometimes called "relaxation", can be almost immediate (10^{−7} to 10^{−3} seconds) or take much longer (e.g. 10^{6} seconds). Ultimately, any overall retained thermodynamic effect can be justified on the basis that any such reverse process is incapable of reaching an ideal thermodynamic end-state of its own accord. As a result, in the course of the mechanical activation of minerals, reverse "relaxation" processes cannot completely decrease the Gibbs free energy that has been created. Hence, energy remains in the material, which is stored in the crystal-lattice defects created.

==== Net thermodynamic effect of HEBM ====
Overall, HEBM renders a net thermodynamic effect:

- The structural disordering implies an increase of both entropy and enthalpy and thus stimulates the crystal properties according to the thermodynamic modifications. Only a small fraction (approximately 10%) of the excess enthalpy of the activated product may be accounted-for as surface-area enlargement.
- Instead, the main part of the excess enthalpy and modified properties can mostly be assigned to the development of thermodynamically unstable states in the material's lattice (and not as a reduction of particle size).
- Since the activated system is unstable, the process of activation is reversible—resulting in deactivation, re-crystallization, entropy loss and energy output of system. That reverse ("relaxation") process continues to a thermodynamic equilibrium, but ultimately can never reach an ideal structure (i.e. one free of defects).
- A more complete description of such an "activation" process factors-in enthalpy also, by which according to the Gibbs-Helmholtz equation, the Gibbs free energy between activated and non-activated solid state can be represented:

$\Delta G = \Delta H - T \Delta S$ where, $\Delta H$ is the change in enthalpy and $\Delta S$ the change in entropy.

==== Resulting crystalline disorder ====
Where the crystal disordering is low, $\Delta S$ is very small (if not negligible). In contrast, in highly deformed and disordered crystals, the values of $\Delta S$ can have a significant impact on the rendered Gibbs free energy. Leaving aside the heat generated during the process on account of friction etc. occasioned during the activation process, the excess Gibbs free energy retained in the activated material can be justified as being due to two changes, namely an increase in ($\Iota$) specific surface area; and ($\Iota$$\Iota$) defect structure. In successful HEBM processes such as EMC Activation:

- as to ($\Iota$), only about 10% of the excess energy of such an activated product may be accounted-for as a change in surface area.
- as to ($\Iota$$\Iota$), almost all the imparted energy is contained in the actual structural defects in the material processed.

==== An approximation for EMC Activation ====
The relatively low value of ($\Iota$) as against the high value of ($\Iota$$\Iota$) serves to further distinguish HEBM from general grinding or "milling" (where instead the only aim there is to increase the surface area of the materials processed), thereby accounting for an explanation for the change in entropy $S$ of the rendered material in the form of elastic energy (stored in lattice defects that can take years to "relax" ) that is the "source of excess Gibbs energy and enthalpy". As for enthalpy $H$, four descriptors can be derived to provide an overview as to the total change during such an activation process:

$\Delta H_T = \Delta H_d + \Delta H_S + \Delta H_A + \Delta H_p$ where:
- $\Delta H_d$ is a measure of the dislocation density;
- $\Delta H_p$ is a measure of new phases (polymorphic transformation);
- $\Delta H_A$ is a measure of the formation of amorphous material;
- $\Delta H_S$ is a measure of specific surface area.

Because the majority of the work exacted during the EMC Activation process goes to aspect ($\Iota$$\Iota$) above, $\Delta H_S$ is trivial. Hence the major functions for the change in enthalpy approximate to:

$$\Delta H _{EMC} \approxeq \Delta H_d + \Delta H_A + \Delta H_p$$

In EMC Activation, the foregoing terms $\Delta H_d$ and $\Delta H_A$ are seen as being particularly prominent because of the nature of the changes in the physical structure observed. Hence, the change in enthalpy $H$ occasioned during EMC Activation can be approximated to:

$\Delta H _{EMC} \thickapprox \Delta H_d + \Delta H_A$ i.e, $\Delta H_{EMC} \thickapprox (\rho M_V) \frac{b^2\mu_s}{4\pi}\ln \left ( \frac{2(\rho)^{1/2}}{b} \right ) + C_AE_A$
where:
- $M_V$, $b$, $\mu_s$ and $\rho$ correspond respectively to the molar volume of the material, Burgers vector, shear modulus and dislocation density;
- $C_A$ and $E_A$ are respectively the concentration of the amorphous phase and molar amorphisation energy.

==== Low temperature reactivity ====
From the above thermodynamic construct, EMC Activation results in a highly amorphous phase that can be justified as a large $\Delta H_A$ and also a large $\Delta H_d$ increase. The benefits of the EMC Activation being large in $H$ means that an EMC's reactivity is less temperature dependent. In terms of any reaction's thermodynamic impetus, a reactant's overall $H$ is not $T$ dependent, meaning that a material having undergone HEBM with a corresponding elevation of $H$ can react at a lower temperature (as the "activated" reactant is rendered less reliant on the temperature-dependent function $T \Delta S$ for its onward progression). Further, an EMC's reaction can exhibit physical mechanisms at extremely small scales "with the formation of thin SiO_{2} layers" to aid a reaction's pathway—with the suggestion that EMC Activation increases the ratio of favourable reaction sites. Studies elsewhere have determined that HEBM can significantly lower the temperature required for a subsequent reaction to proceed (up to a three-fold reduction), whereby a major component of the overall reaction-dynamics is initiated at a "nanocrystalline or amorphous phase" to exhibit "unusually low or even negative values of the apparent activation energy" required to cause a chemical reaction to occur.

Overall, EMCs are likely less temperature dependent for a chemical pathway's onward progression (see section above on Pozzolanic reactions), which may explain why EMCs provide self-healing benefits even at low arctic temperatures.

=== Physical justification (amorphisation) ===
Large changes in $\Delta G$, more particularly in the resultant values of $\Delta H_A$ and $\Delta H_d$ provide an insight into EMC Activation's efficacy. The amorphisation of crystalline material at high-pressure conditions "is a rather unusual phenomenon" for the simple reason that "most materials actually experience the reverse transformation from amorphous to crystalline at high-pressure conditions". Amorphisation represents a highly distorted "periodicity" of a material's lattice element, comprising a relatively high Gibbs free energy. Indeed, amorphisation may be compared to a quasi-molten state.

As a possible explanation of why amorphous silica is more reactive than its crystalline version, thermodynamic treatments may give further insight, even if such approaches cannot fully explain the phenomenon. For example, the so-called "glass transition temperature" increases with an increasing cooling rate $q_0$ (i.e., $dT=\pm q_0dt$) that allows energy to be accumulated as if "frozen in". Thus, by substantially increasing that cooling rate, "glasses with thermodynamic properties can be obtained, substantially different from those of the initial metastable undercooled liquid". At very high cooling rates, the enthalpy frozen into the resulting vitrified system can be equal to (or exceed) the enthalpy of melting $H_m$ where the cooling rate $q_0$ is to the order of 10^{6} to 10^{9} K/s and upwards. Hence, assuming that the shock-wave dynamics of the EMC Activation process hold true, such that focal nanoscale temperature fluctuations are extremely transient (as described generally per the next section), means that the cooling rates during the HEBM process are to at least similar orders of magnitude, if not more. Hence:

$\Delta H _A \geq \Delta H_m$ (recalling that $\Delta H _{EMC} \approxeq \Delta H_d + \Delta H_A + \Delta H_p$)

As a result of the rise in $H_A$, the chemical potential of the system is increased and "frozen in", which gives rise to an increase in any subsequent reactivity. All told, in common with other HEBM processes, EMC Activation causes crystalline destruction because of extremely violent and disruptive factors that are occasioned at the nanoscale of the material being processed. Although over in short duration and highly focal, the processes are repeated at a high frequency: hence those factors are thought to mimic pressures and temperatures found deep inside the Earth to cause the required phase change. For example, Peter Thiessen developed the magma-plasma model that assumes localised temperatures—higher than 10^{3} kelvins—can be generated at the various impact points to induce a momentary excited plasma state in the material, characterized by the ejection of electrons and photons together with the formation of excited fragments (see diagram above). Experimental data gathered from localised crack-generation, itself an important component of EMC Activation, has confirmed temperatures in this region as long ago as 1975.

=== Vibratory Ball Mills (VBMs) ===
For EMC activation, the HEBM method used is a vibratory ball mill (VBM). A VBM uses a vertical eccentric drive-mechanism to vibrate an enclosed chamber up to many hundreds of cycles per minute. The chamber is filled with the material being processed together with specialised objects called grinding media. In their most simple format, such media can be simple balls made from specialised ceramics. In practical terms, EMC Activation deploys a range of grinding media of different sizes, shapes and composites to achieve the required mechanochemical transformation.

It has been suggested that a VBM will grind at 20 to 30 times the rate of a rotary ball mill, reflecting that a VBM's mechanism is especially rapacious.

==== VBM kinetics ====
In simple terms, the compressive force $F$ acting between two identical colliding balls in a VBM can be expressed:

$F =\left [ \left ( \frac{5m}{8} \right ) ^{3/5} \left ( \frac{2r}{9 \pi^2k^2} \right )^{1/5} \right ]v^{6/5}$ where, $k = \frac{1 - v^2}{\pi E}$
where, $m$ is the mass of both balls, $r$ the radius, $v$ the absolute velocity of impact and $E$ the Young's modulus of the balls' material.

As can be seen, an increase in velocity of impact increases $F$. The size and mass of the grinding media also contribute. $F$'s denominator term $k$ incorporates $E$ meaning that the nature of the material used for the grinding media is an important factor ($k$ is ultimately squared in $F$, so its negative value is of no consequence). More fundamentally, due to the rapid vibration a high acceleration is imparted to the grinding media, whereupon the continuous, short, sharp impacts on the load result in rapid particle-size reduction. In addition, high pressures and shear stresses facilitate the required phase transition to an amorphous state both at the point of impact and also during the transmission of shock-waves that can yield even greater pressures than the impact itself.

For example, the contact time of a two-ball collision can be as short as 20μs, generating a pressure of 3.3 GPa upwards and with an associated ambient temperature increase of 20 kelvins. Because of the short duration of the impact, the rate of change in momentum is significant—generating a shock wave of duration only 1-100μs but with an associated pressure of 10 GPa upwards and a highly localised and focal temperature (i.e., at the nanoscale) up to several thousands of kelvins. To place this into context, a pressure of 10GPa is equivalent to about 1,000 kilometers of sea water. As a further example, the impact of two identical steel balls of 2.5 cm diameter of velocity 1 m/s will generate a collision energy density of over 10^{9} joules/m^{2}, with alumina balls of the same 2.5 cm diameter and velocity of 1 m/s generating an even greater energy density. The collisions occur in a very short timescale and hence the "rate of energy release over the relatively small contact area can be very high".

== See also ==
Background science to EMC Activation:

- Contact mechanics – Study of the deformation of solids that touch each other
- Crystallinity – Degree of structural order in a solid
- Crystal structure – Ordered arrangement of atoms, ions, or molecules in a crystalline material
- Hardness – Measure of a material's resistance to localized plastic deformation
- Lattice constant – Physical dimensions of unit cells in a crystal
- Material mechanics
- Materials science – Research of materials
- Microstructure – Very small scale structure of material
- Peter Adolf Thiessen – German physical chemist (1899–1990)
- Surface engineering – Altering the properties of solid surfaces
- Surface metrology – Measurement of small-scale features on surfaces
- Tribology – Science of rubbing surfaces

Academic:

- Luleå University of Technology – University in Sweden
