= AFt phases =

Aluminate Ferrite trisubstituted phases

AFt Phases refer to the calcium Aluminate Ferrite trisubstituted, or calcium aluminate trisubstituted, phases present in hydrated (or hardened) cement paste (HCP) in concrete.

== AFm and AFt phases in cement hydration products ==
Calcium aluminates can form complex salts in combination with different types of anions. Two series of calcium aluminates are known in cement chemistry: AFm and AFt phases, being respectively mono- or tri-substituted with a given divalent anion X (e.g. SO^{2−}_{4}, CO^{2−}_{3}, or hosting a divalent impurity such as SeO^{2−}_{4}...), or with two units of a monovalent anion, e.g. OH^{−}, Cl^{−}, or hosting a monovalent impurity such as I^{−}, or B(OH)^{−}_{4}...).

Their general formulas are respectively:

AFm phases:	3CaO·Al_{2}O_{3}·CaX·nH_{2}O, or C_{4}AXH_{n} in cement chemist notation (CCN)
AFt phases:	3CaO·Al_{2}O_{3}·3CaX·nH_{2}O, or C_{6}AX_{3}H_{n} in CCN

in which n, the number of water molecules present in the hydrate, is in the range 10 to 12 for the AFm phases, and around 32 for the AFt phases.

== AFt phases ==
AFt phases are important hydration products of the cement clinker. They are crystalline hydrates with generic formula 3CaO·(Al,Fe)_{2}O_{3}·3CaX·nH_{2}O when also taking into account the possible substitution of the aluminium ion (Al^{3+}) by the ferric ion (Fe^{3+}). They are formed when tricalcium aluminate (3CaO·Al_{2}O_{3}, also noted C_{3}A) reacts with a dissolved calcium salt (CaX). CaX is most commonly CaSO_{4}, but can also be CaCO_{3} giving rise to sulfoaluminate, or carboaluminate, respectively.

=== Tri-sulfoaluminate ===
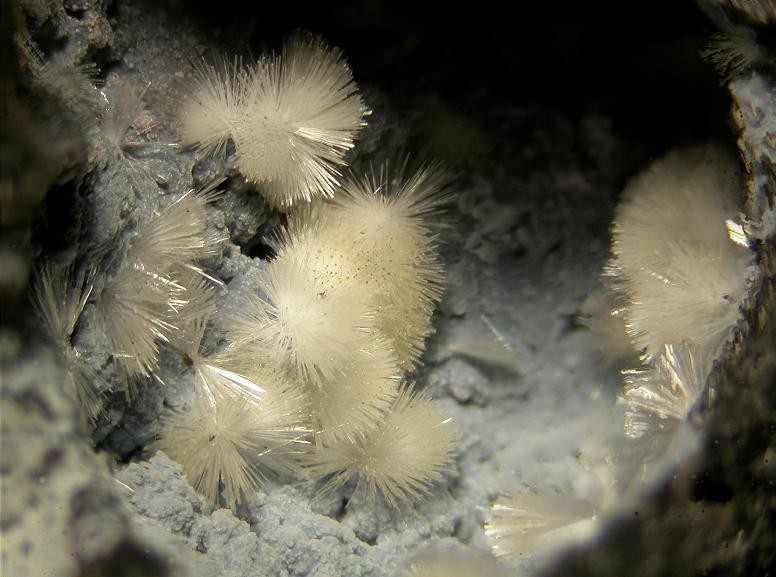
Ettringite is the main representative of AFt phases. It crystallizes under the form of characteristic acicular needles, often encountered as fibrous aggregates filling small cavities in concrete.

The main and most known AFt phase is ettringite, also existing as a natural mineral which was first described in 1874 by J. Lehmann, for an occurrence near the Ettringer Bellerberg Volcano, Ettringen, Rheinland-Pfalz, Germany.

Ettringite is also known as the 'Candlot's salt' in honor of the pioneering work of the French chemist Édouard Candlot (1858-1922) who studied cement hydration and discovered calcium sulfo-aluminates. Henri Louis Le Chatelier also identified AFt phases when he investigated cement hydration products after the discovery of Candlot.

In the years 1930-1940, the system CaO−Al_{2}O_{3}−CaSO_{4}−K_{2}O−H_{2}O at 25°C was studied in detail by Jones.

In concrete chemistry, ettringite is a hexacalcium aluminate trisulfate hydrate, of general formula 6CaO·Al_{2}O_{3}·3SO_{3}·32H_{2}O, or 3CaO·Al_{2}O_{3}·3CaSO_{4}·32H_{2}O, also abbreviated as C_{6}AS̅_{3}H_{32} in cement chemist notation.

Ettringite is formed in the hydrated Portland cement system as a result of the reaction of tricalcium aluminate (C_{3}A) with calcium sulfate, both present in Portland cement.

C_{3}A + 3 CaSO_{4} + 32 H_{2}O → ettringite

Ettringite, the most prominent representative of AFt phases or (Al_{2}O_{3} − Fe_{2}O_{3} − tri), can also be directly synthesized in aqueous solution by reacting stoichiometric amounts of calcium oxide, aluminium oxide, and sulfate.

In the cement system, the presence of ettringite depends on the ratio of calcium sulfate to tri-calcium aluminate (C_{3}A); when this ratio is low, ettringite forms during early hydration and then converts to the corresponding calcium aluminate monosulfate (AFm phase or (Al_{2}O_{3} − Fe_{2}O_{3} − mono)). When the ratio is intermediate, only a portion of the ettringite converts to AFm and both can coexist, while ettringite is unlikely to convert to AFm at high ratios.

=== Tri-carboaluminate ===
Jones (1938) reported the existence and some optical characteristics of AFt and AFm calcium carboaluminate hydrate phases. Feldman et al. (1965) have shown that the hydration reaction of 3CaO·Al_{2}O_{3} can be suppressed by CaCO_{3} additions and that this is primarily due to the formation of calcium carboaluminate onto the surface of the C_{3}A grains. The mechanism is the same as with the sulfate ion released by the more soluble gypsum added to the cement clinker during its milling to prevent the flash setting of concrete.

According to Carlson and Berman (1960) and Klieger (1990), carbonate-AFm, monocarbonate and hemicarbonate, are more stable than carbonate-AFt, the tricarboaluminate.

Lothenbach and Winnefeld (2006) thermodynamic calculations also indicate that in the presence of small amounts of calcite, calcium aluminate monocarbonates (AFm) are present amongst the main common hydration products of ordinary Portland cement, along with the other hydrates, C-S-H, portlandite, and ettringite.

The tricarboaluminate, 3CaO·Al_{2}O_{3}·3CaCO_{3}·32H_{2}O (C_{6}AC̅_{3}H_{32}), is the carbonate equivalent of ettringite, 3CaO·Al_{2}O_{3}·3CaSO_{4}·32H_{2}O (C_{6}AS̅_{3}H_{32}). It has an isomorph structure and the same number of water hydration molecules: 32 H_{2}O. The corresponding monocarboaluminate 3CaO·Al_{2}O_{3}·CaCO_{3}·11H_{2}O (C_{4}AC̅H_{11}) is also less hydrated: 11 water molecules in place of 12 for the monosulfoaluminate.

== Reactivity of C_{3}A during clinker hydration ==
Amongst the four main phases of the cement clinker (alite: C_{3}S, belite: C_{2}S, C_{3}A, and the tetracalcium alumino ferrite: C_{4}AF), the tricalcium aluminate (C_{3}A: 3CaO·Al_{2}O_{3}), is the most reactive phase and its hydration reaction is also the most exothermic. If nothing is done to control and slow down the C_{3}A hydration rate, concrete can be easily subjected to flash setting, especially if the ambient temperature is elevated during the summer.

This is why a small addition of 2 – 5 wt. % of gypsum (CaSO_{4}·2H_{2}O: solubility ~ 1 – 2 g/L water) is done to the clinker during the grinding process to manufacture cement. During the making of concrete, gypsum dissolves at the contact with water, freeing up Ca^{2+} and SO^{2−}_{4} ions in solution. These ions react with aluminate Al(OH)^{−}_{4} ions present at the surface of the hydrating C_{3}A grains forming a thin impervious coating of less soluble ettringite according to the following reaction:

6 Ca^{2+} + 2 Al(OH)^{−}_{4} + 4 OH^{−} + 3 SO^{2−}_{4} + 26 H_{2}O → 3CaO·Al_{2}O_{3}·3CaSO_{4}·32H_{2}O

As a consequence, the surface of C_{3}A particles undergoes some passivation, becomes less accessible, and the C_{3}A hydration reaction slows down. A similar effect, although less pronounced, can also be obtained in the presence of the less soluble calcium carbonate (CaCO_{3}).

== Conversion of AFt-sulfate ⇌ AFm-sulfate ==
In the absence of an external source of sulfate ions, the transformation of ettringite (AFt) into AFm and vice versa depends both on temperature and on pH conditions (concentration in OH^{−} ions) in the concrete pore water. Different mechanisms can co-exist and can explain these transformations.

A first mechanism can directly depend on the respective thermodynamic stability (solubility: dissolution-precipitation reactions) of each phase, as a function of temperature and pH.

Another mechanism can depend on the sorption of sulfate anions onto the C-S-H phases. The sorption of SO^{2−}_{4} onto C-S-H increases with temperature and pH. At high T, or high pH, because of this sorption, the concrete pore water is depleted in sulfate anions and AFm preferentially forms with respect to AFt (ettringite). When T, or pH, decreases due to the cooling of concrete after setting and hardening, or because of the leaching of the concrete structure by water (immersed concrete component, such as a pile of a bridge), the sulfate ions physically adsorbed onto C-S-H are released (desorption process) into the concrete pore water and become available for the slow crystal growth of AFt (ettringite).

Other mechanisms have also been proposed in the literature, such as the slow and delayed release of sulfate ions by the clinker. Oxidation of iron(II) sulfides, such as pyrite (FeS_{2}), or pyrrhotite (Fe_{(1-x)}S), sometimes present in construction aggregates can also represent an additional internal source of sulfate into concrete.

One mechanism does not necessarily exclude the other ones as all can co-exist. If the external sulfate attacks (ESA) are relatively well known, for internal sulfate attack (ISA) (delayed ettringite formation, DEF) there is no unanimity on the relative importance of the main mechanism at work inside concrete and the question is still debated.

=== Effect of temperature ===
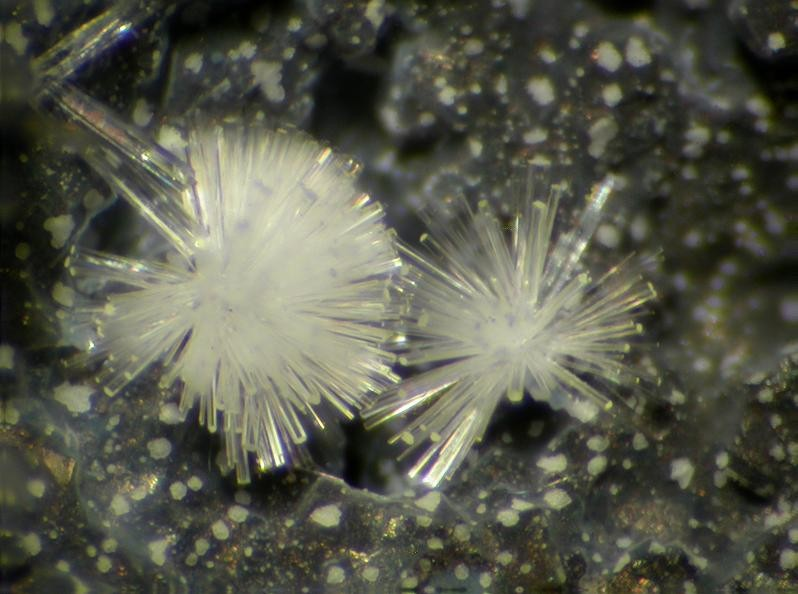
Ettringite needles growing radially

At temperature lower than 65 °C, ettringite (AFt) is less soluble than AFm and therefore ettringite precipitates in a privileged way. Around 65 °C, the solubilities of ettringite and AFm are similar (in fact, it also depends on the pH value of the concrete pore water, as explained further in the next section). Above 65 °C, ettringite is more soluble than AFm and the less soluble AFm phase preferentially precipitates. If concrete is poured by hot weather in the summer, or that the concrete component or the structure is massive and that its internal temperature exceeds 65 °C, ettringite does not form, but only AFm. While concrete sets and hardens, it cools down back to ambient temperature.

During the months, or the years, after its placing, concrete is subject to slow chemical reactions accompanied by mineral phases transformations and volumetric changes. Back to ambient temperature, AFm becomes more soluble that ettringite and slowly dissolves while ettringite slowly crystallizes.

This slow conversion reaction is known under the name of Delayed Ettringite Formation (DEF) and can be schematically expressed as:

AFm + 2 CaSO_{4} + 20 H_{2}O → AFt (delayed ettringite formation: DEF reaction)

Ettringite occupies a larger volume than AFm phase and crystallizes under the form of acicular needles. This reaction is expansive and can cause a huge crystallization pressure in the small concrete pores once they are totally filled by the growing ettringite crystals. As a consequence, the hardened cement paste (HCP) is submitted to an important tensile stress and starts to crack because of the internal expansion of the concrete matrix.

Contrary to the primary ettringite initially formed when concrete is still in the plastic state before hardening, the DEF reaction occurring in hardened concrete can be very harmful for concrete structures and components, potentially compromising their structural integrity and stability. Ultimately, DEF can cause the ruin of concrete structures.

=== Effect of pH ===
At high pH, in the presence of dissolved aluminates and calcium ions, ettringite is transformed into AFm-sulfate:

3CaO·Al_{2}O_{3}·3CaSO_{4} · 32 H_{2}O + 4 Al(OH)^{−}_{4} + 6 Ca^{2+} + 8 OH^{−} → 3CaO·Al_{2}O_{3}·CaSO_{4} · 12 H_{2}O + 8 H_{2}O

The conversion of AFt into AFm at high pH can be schematically summarized as:

AFt + n OH^{−} → AFm

The reverse reaction can also occur when concrete with a high alkali content (NaOH/KOH, expressed as Na_{2}O_{eq}) is leached by water:

AFm → AFt + n OH^{−}

AFm converts back into AFt or ettringite. The slow crystal growth of small needles of ettringite into the concrete pores can exert an important crystallization pressure inside the concrete matrix. This reaction is expansive and can be very damaging for concrete structures and components.

To minimize the risk of DEF in massive concrete structures continuously immersed in water and subject to alkali leaching (bridge piles, locks, sluices, dams), a low Na_{2}O_{eq} content is therefore also a desirable characteristic for the selected sulfate resisting (SR) cement.

== Internal and external sulfate attacks of concrete ==
The formation of ettringite in the hardened cement paste is an internal expansive chemical reaction that can lead to severe degradation of concrete.

The two main classical forms are the internal sulfate attack (ISA), also known as delayed ettringite formation (DEF), already described before, and the external sulfate attack (ESA) when concrete is exposed to an external source of sulfate, such as dissolved sulfate sometimes directly present in soils or aquifers, or produced by pyrite oxidation (see acid mine drainage).

In ESA, or when pyrite oxidation is also sometimes involved in contaminated aggregates, beside ettringite crystallization, a lot of gypsum (CaSO_{4}·2H_{2}O) can also be formed in the ultimate degradation stage.

A less common, but very severe, form of ESA is the thaumasitic form of sulfate attack (TSA) when concrete is exposed to an external source of sulfate in the concomitant presence of carbonate, HCO^{−}_{3} ions, or CO_{2}. It preferentially occurs in clay formations exposed to air oxygen by excavation works and in which pyrite has been oxidized. The sulfuric acid (H_{2}SO_{4}) produced by pyrite oxidation also dissolves carbonates present in the surrounding clay, or directly in the concrete aggregates, freeing up the two main ingredients necessary for this very deleterious pathology. In contrast to conventional ESA, no expansive phase as ettringite needles forms, but thaumasite (CaSiO_{3}·CaCO_{3}·CaSO_{4}·15H_{2}O), which consumes the calcium silicate hydrates (C-S-H, the "glue" of the hardened cement paste), ultimately leading to the decohesion of the cement paste. In the most severe cases, concrete suffering TSA can be dug with a simple shovel, or even by hand.

Thaumasite forms a continuous solid-solution series with ettringite (AFt). Indeed, as more easily observable in another, but equivalent, expression of its chemical composition, Ca[Si(OH)_{6}]·CaCO_{3}·CaSO_{4}·12H_{2}O, its crystal lattice is isostructural with that of ettringite and an unusually hexacoordinated silicate anion [Si(OH)_{6}]^{2−} can take the place of an aluminate anions [Al(OH)_{6}]^{3−} in octahedral position, as long as another ion compensates for the difference in electrical charge. Although, thaumasite can develop alone at low temperature in the absence of ettringite (AFt), thus even in sulfate-resisting cement (SR0 cement without C_{3}A), the presence of ettringite (AFt) acts as a scaffold (template, chaperone) for thaumasite crystallization and therefore favors its formation by hetero-epitaxy.

== Prevention of sulfate attacks ==
To minimize, and ideally to avoid, delayed ettringite formation (DEF; synonym: internal sulfate attack, ISA), several precautions can be taken:

- Maintaining the maximal temperature inside the concrete to a value lower than 65 °C, but as this critical threshold temperature also depends on the pH of the concrete pore water, it is advised not to exceed 60 °C. Low-heat Portland cements with a coarse granulometry size, or better, the choice of an appropriate metallurgic cement with a high content in blast furnace slags (BFS), and therefore a low content in Portland clinker, can be a way to keep temperature sufficiently low. Metallurgic cements are latent hydraulic binders and slow setting cements. They have the double advantage of producing less heat and also spreading their heat production over a longer time period. If the ambient temperature is too high in the summer, no concrete casting is allowed, or special precautions need to be taken such as making concrete with ice and cold aggregates in desertic conditions.
- Selecting a cement with a low-alkali content (Na_{2}O_{eq} < 0.60 wt. % according to the European cement norm EN 197).
- Choosing a sulfate-resisting (SR) cement with a low C_{3}A content < 3 wt. % according to the European cement norm EN 197), or with the lowest possible C_{3}A content (ideally 0 wt. %).

For massive concrete structures whose temperature at core will likely exceed 65 °C during the cement setting and hardening and moreover will be immersed under water or exposed to alkali leaching, the only effective solution to avoid, or to minimize, delayed ettringite formation is to eliminate the tricalcium aluminate C_{3}A phase in the cement clinker, or to drastically reduce its content. Concomitantly, it will also make it possible to limit the quantity of gypsum added to clinker during its grinding to avoid the risk of cement flash setting due to the very exothermic hydration reaction of C_{3}A.

Eliminating the root cause of DEF by removing C_{3}A, the main culprit phase present in the cement, is the only way to completely get rid of DEF (ISA).

The same precaution also applies to the prevention of the conventional external sulfate attack (ESA) when concrete is exposed to an external source of sulfate in the presence of water.

However, this precaution is insufficient to completely eliminate the risk of formation of thaumasite (TSA) because this latter can still develop, although with more difficulty, in concrete made with sulfate-resistant cement.

Finally, as a last resort, but challenging for immersed concrete structures, when feasible to prevent the development of expansive internal reactions harmful for concrete, it is always advisable to minimize the contact of concrete with water.

== See also ==
- AFm phases – Aluminate Ferrite monosubstituted or calcium aluminate monosubstituted
- Aluminate – Compound containing an oxyanion of aluminium
- Calcium aluminates – Chemical compound
- Tricalcium aluminate – Compound associated with Portland cement
- Dodecacalcium hepta-aluminate – Rare mineral mayenite and important phase in calcium aluminate cements
- Calcium aluminate cements – Rapidly setting hydraulic cements
- Sulfate attack in concrete and mortar – Concrete degradation mainly caused by ettringite crystallization
- Concrete degradation – Damage to concrete affecting its mechanical strength and its durability
