= AFm phases =

Aluminate Ferrite monosubstituted or calcium aluminate monosubstituted

An AFm phase is an "alumina, ferric oxide, monosubstituted" phase, or aluminate ferrite monosubstituted, or Al_{2}O_{3}, Fe_{2}O_{3} mono, in cement chemist notation (CCN). AFm phases are important hydration products in the hydration of Portland cements and hydraulic cements.

They are crystalline hydrates with generic, simplified, formula 3CaO·(Al,Fe)_{2}O_{3}·CaX_{y}·nH_{2}O,
where:

- CaO, Al_{2}O_{3}, Fe_{2}O_{3} represent calcium oxide, aluminium oxide, and ferric oxide, respectively;
- CaX represents a calcium salt, where X replaces an oxide ion;
- X is the substituted anion in CaX:
  – divalent (SO^{2−}_{4}, CO^{2−}_{3}...) with y = 1, or;
  – monovalent (OH^{−}, Cl^{−}...) with y = 2.
- n represents the number of water molecules in the hydrate and may be comprised between 13 and 19.

AFm form inter alia when tricalcium aluminate 3CaO·Al_{2}O_{3}, or C_{3}A in CCN, reacts with dissolved calcium sulfate (CaSO_{4}), or calcium carbonate (CaCO_{3}). As the sulfate form is the dominant one in AFm phases in the hardened cement paste (HCP) in concrete, AFm is often simply referred to as Aluminate Ferrite monosulfate or calcium aluminate monosulfate. However, carbonate-AFm phases also exist (monocarbonate and hemicarbonate) and are thermodynamically more stable than the sulfate-AFm phase. During concrete carbonation by the atmospheric CO_{2}, sulfate-AFm phase is also slowly transformed into carbonate-AFm phases.

== Different AFm phases ==
AFm phases belong to the class of layered double hydroxides (LDH). LDHs are hydroxides with a double layer structure. The main cation is divalent (M^{2+}) and its electrical charge is compensated by 2 OH^{−} anions: M(OH)_{2}. Some M^{2+} cations are replaced by a trivalent one (N^{3+}). This creates an excess of positive electrical charges which needs to be compensated by the same number of negative electrical charges born by anions. These anions are located in the space present in between adjacent hydroxide layers. The interlayers in LDHs are also occupied by water molecules accompanying the anions counterbalancing the excess of positive charges created by the cation isomorphic substitution in the hydroxides sheets.

In the most studied class of LDHs, the positive layer (c), consisting of divalent M^{2+} and trivalent N^{3+} cations, can be represented by the generic formula:

[M^{2+}_{1-x}N^{3+}_{x}(OH^{−})_{2}]^{x+} [(X^{n−})_{x/n} · yH_{2}O]^{x-}

where X^{n−} is the intercalating anion.

In AFm, the divalent cation is a calcium ion (Ca^{2+}), while the substituting trivalent cation is an aluminium ion (Al^{3+}). The nature of the counterbalancing anion (X^{n−}) can be very diverse: OH^{−}, Cl^{−}, SO^{2−}_{4}, CO^{2−}_{3}, NO^{−}_{3}, NO^{−}_{2}. The thickness of the interlayer is sufficient to host a variety of relatively large anions often present as impurities: B(OH)^{−}_{4}, SeO^{2−}_{4}, SeO^{2−}_{3}... As other LDHs, AFm can incorporate in their structure toxic elements such as boron and selenium. Some AFm phases are presented in the table here below as a function of the nature of the anion counterbalancing the excess of positive charges in the Ca(OH)_{2} hydroxide sheets. As in portlandite (Ca(OH)_{2}), the hydroxide sheets of AFm are made of hexa-coordinated octahedral cations located in a same plane, but due to the excess of positive electrical charges, the hydroxide sheets are distorted.

Different AFm phases as a function of the nature of the counterbalancing anion in the LDH structure and its stoichiometry
n Anion	AFm name	Oxide notation	LDH formula	Reference
$\ce{yX-}$	AFm-generic	3CaO·Al_{2}O_{3}·CaX_{y}·nH_{2}O	Ca_{4}Al_{2}X_{y}(OH)_{12}·(n− 6)H_{2}O	—
$\ce{2OH-}$	AFm-monohydrate	3CaO·Al_{2}O_{3}·Ca(OH)_{2}·10H_{2}O	Ca_{4}Al_{2}(OH)_{14}·4H_{2}O	Hydrocalumite (HBM) (Mindat)
$\ce{1SO4^2-}$	AFm-monosulfate	3CaO·Al_{2}O_{3}·CaSO_{4}·12H_{2}O	Ca_{4}Al_{2}(SO_{4})(OH)_{12}·6H_{2}O	Divet (2000)
$\ce{1CO3^2-}$	AFm-monocarbonate	3CaO·Al_{2}O_{3}·CaCO_{3}·11H_{2}O	Ca_{4}Al_{2}(CO_{3})(OH)_{12}·5H_{2}O	Divet (2000)
$\ce{1/2CO3^2- + 1OH-}$	AFm-hemicarbonate	3CaO·Al_{2}O_{3}·½CaCO_{3}·½Ca(OH)_{2}·11.5H_{2}O	Ca_{4}Al_{2}(CO_{3})_{½}(OH)_{13}·5.5H_{2}O	Divet (2000)
$\ce{2Cl-}$	Friedel's salt	3CaO·Al_{2}O_{3}·CaCl_{2}·10H_{2}O	Ca_{4}Al_{2}Cl_{2}(OH)_{12}·4H_{2}O	Friedel (1897)
$\ce{1Cl- + 1/2SO4^2-}$	Kuzel's salts	3CaO·Al_{2}O_{3}·½CaSO_{4}·½CaCl_{2}·11H_{2}O	Ca_{4}Al_{2}(SO_{4})_{½}Cl(OH)_{12}·5H_{2}O	Glasser (1999)
$\ce{2NO3-}$	AFm-nitrate	3CaO·Al_{2}O_{3}·Ca(NO_{3})_{2}·10H_{2}O	Ca_{4}Al_{2}(NO_{3})_{2}(OH)_{12}·4H_{2}O	Balonis & Glasser (2011)
$\ce{2NO2-}$	AFm-nitrite	3CaO·Al_{2}O_{3}·Ca(NO_{2})_{2}·10H_{2}O	Ca_{4}Al_{2}(NO_{2})_{2}(OH)_{12}·4H_{2}O	Balonis & Glasser (2011)

To convert the oxide notation in LDH formula, the mass balance in the system has to respect the principle of the conservation of matter. Oxide ions (O^{2−}) and water are transformed into 2 hydroxide anions (OH^{−}) according to the acid-base reaction between H_{2}O and O^{2−} (a strong base) as typically exemplified by the quicklime (CaO) slaking process:

H_{2}O + O^{2−} ⇌ OH^{−} + OH^{−},
A_{1} + B_{2} ⇌ B_{1} + A_{2}
or simply,
O^{2−} + H_{2}O ⇌ 2 OH^{−}

== AFm structure ==
AFm phases encompass a class of calcium aluminate hydrates (C-A-H) whose structure derives from that of hydrocalumite: 4CaO·Al_{2}O_{3}·13–19H_{2}O, in which OH^{−} anions are partly replaced by SO^{2−}_{4} or CO^{2−}_{3} anions. The different mineral phases resulting from these anionic substitutions do not easily form solid solutions but behave as independent phases. The replacement of hydroxide ions by sulfate ions does not exceed 50 mol %. So, AFm does not refer to a single pure mineralogical phase but rather to a mix of several AFm phases co-existing in hydrated cement paste (HCP).

Considering a monovalent anion X, the chemical formula can be rearranged and expressed as 2[Ca_{2}(Al,Fe)(OH)_{6}]·X·nH_{2}O (or Ca_{4}(Al,Fe)_{2}(OH)_{12}·X·nH_{2}O, as presented in the table in the former section). The Me(OH)_{6} octahedral ions are located in a plane as for calcium or magnesium hydroxides in portlandite or brucite hexagonal sheets respectively. The replacement of one divalent Ca^{2+} cation by a trivalent Al^{3+} cation, or to a lesser extent by a Fe^{3+} cation, with a Ca:Al ratio of 2:1 (one Al substituted for every 3 cations) causes an excess of positive charge in the sheet: 2[2Ca(OH)_{2}·(Al,Fe)(OH)_{2}]^{+} to be compensated by 2 negative charges X^{–}. The anions X^{–} counterbalancing the positive charge imbalance born by the sheet are located in the interlayer whose spacing is much larger than in the layered structure of brucite or portlandite. This allows the AFm structure to accommodate larger anionic species along with water molecules.

The crystal structure of AFm phases is that of layered double hydroxide (LDH) and AFm phases also exhibit the same anion exchange properties. The carbonate anion (CO^{2−}_{3}) occupies the interlayer space in a privileged way with the highest selectivity coefficient and is more retained in the interlayer than other divalent or monovalent anions such as SO^{2−}_{4} or OH^{−}.

According to Miyata (1983), the equilibrium constant (selectivity coefficient) for anion exchange varies in the order CO^{2−}_{3} > HPO^{2−}_{4} > SO^{2−}_{4} for divalent anions, and OH^{−} > F^{−} > Cl^{−} > Br^{−} > NO^{−}_{3} > I^{−} for monovalent anions, but this order is not universal and varies with the nature of the LDH.

== Thermodynamic stability ==
The thermodynamic stability of AFm phases studied at 25 °C depends on the nature of the anion present in the interlayer: CO^{2−}_{3} stabilises AFm and displaces OH^{−} and SO^{2−}_{4} anions at their concentrations typically found in hardened cement paste (HCP). Different sources of carbonate can contribute to the carbonation of AFm phases: Addition of limestone filler finely ground, atmospheric CO_{2}, carbonate present as impurity in the gypsum interground with the clinker to avoid cement flash setting, and "alkali sulfates" condensed onto clinker during its cooling, or from added clinker kiln dust. Carbonation can rapidly occur within the fresh concrete during its setting and hardening (internal carbonate sources), or slowly continue in the long-term in the hardened cement paste in concrete exposed to external sources of carbonate: CO_{2} from the air, or bicarbonate anion (HCO^{−}_{3}) present in groundwater (immersed structures) or clay porewater (foundations and underground structures).

When the carbonate concentration increases in the hardened cement paste (HCP), hydroxy-AFm are progressively replaced, first by hemicarboaluminate and then by monocarboaluminate. The stability of AFm phases increases with their carbonate content as shown by Damidot and Glasser (1995) by means of their thermodynamic calculations of the CaO-Al_{2}O_{3}-SiO_{2}-H_{2}O system at 25 °C.

When carbonate displaces sulfate from AFm, the sulfate released in the concrete pore water may react with portlandite (Ca(OH)_{2}) to form ettringite (3CaO·Al_{2}O_{3}·3CaSO_{4}·32H_{2}O), the main AFt phase present in the hydrated cement system.

As stressed by Matschei et al. (2007), the impact of small amounts of carbonate on the nature and stability of the AFm phases is noteworthy. Divet (2000) also notes that micromolar amount of carbonate can inhibit the formation of AFm sulfate, favoring so the crystallisation of ettringite (AFt sulfate).

== See also ==
- AFt phases
- Concrete degradation#Chloride attack
- Layered double hydroxides (LDH)
- Friedel's salt
- Ettringite (AFt)
- Pitting corrosion of rebar induced by chloride attack
