= Ettringite =

Hydrous calcium sulfo-aluminate

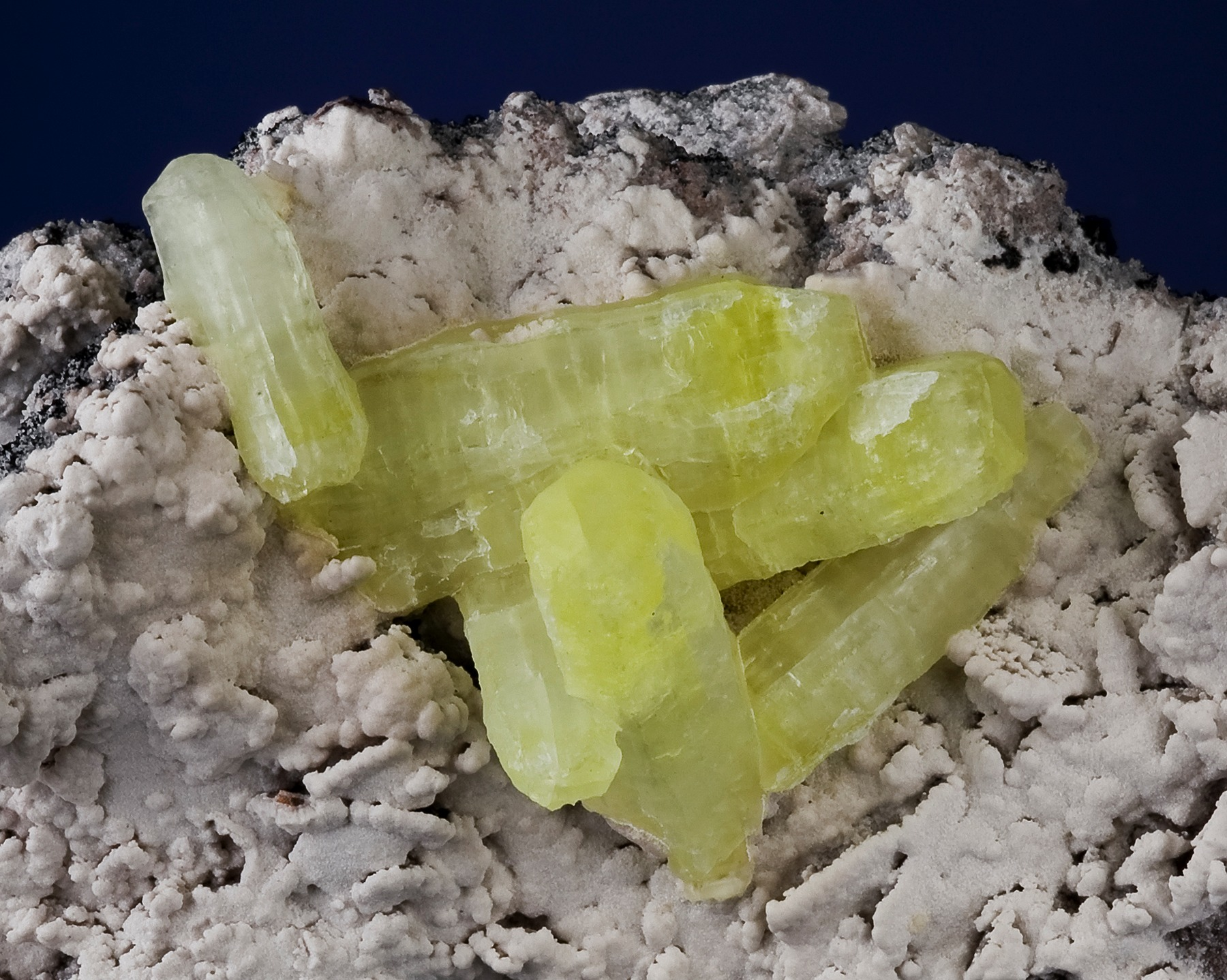
- Ettringite, Kalahari manganese fields, Northern Cape Province, South Africa

General
- Category: Sulfate minerals
- Formula: Ca_{6}Al_{2}(SO_{4})_{3}(OH)_{12}·26H_{2}O
- IMA symbol: Ett
- Strunz classification: 7.DG.15
- Crystal system: Trigonal
- Crystal class: Ditrigonal pyramidal (3m); H-M symbol: (3m)
- Space group: P31c
- Unit cell: a = 11.23, c = 21.44 [Å]; Z = 2

Identification
- Color: Colorless, pale yellow, milky white
- Crystal habit: Acicular growth, striated prismatic crystals; fibrous to cottonlike
- Cleavage: Perfect on {101̅0}
- Mohs scale hardness: 2–2.5
- Luster: Vitreous
- Streak: White
- Diaphaneity: Transparent to opaque
- Specific gravity: 1.77
- Optical properties: Uniaxial (−)
- Refractive index: n_{ω} = 1.491, n_{ε} = 1.470
- Birefringence: δ = 0.021
- Ultraviolet fluorescence: Non-fluorescent
- Solubility: Partially soluble in water
- Alters to: Partially dehydration on atmospheric exposure, becomes opaque

Ettringite is a hydrous calcium aluminium sulfate mineral with formula: Ca_{6}Al_{2}(SO_{4})_{3}(OH)_{12}·26H_{2}O. It is a colorless to yellow mineral crystallizing in the trigonal system. The prismatic crystals are typically colorless, turning white on partial dehydration. It is part of the ettringite-group which includes other sulfates such as thaumasite and bentorite.

== Discovery and occurrence ==
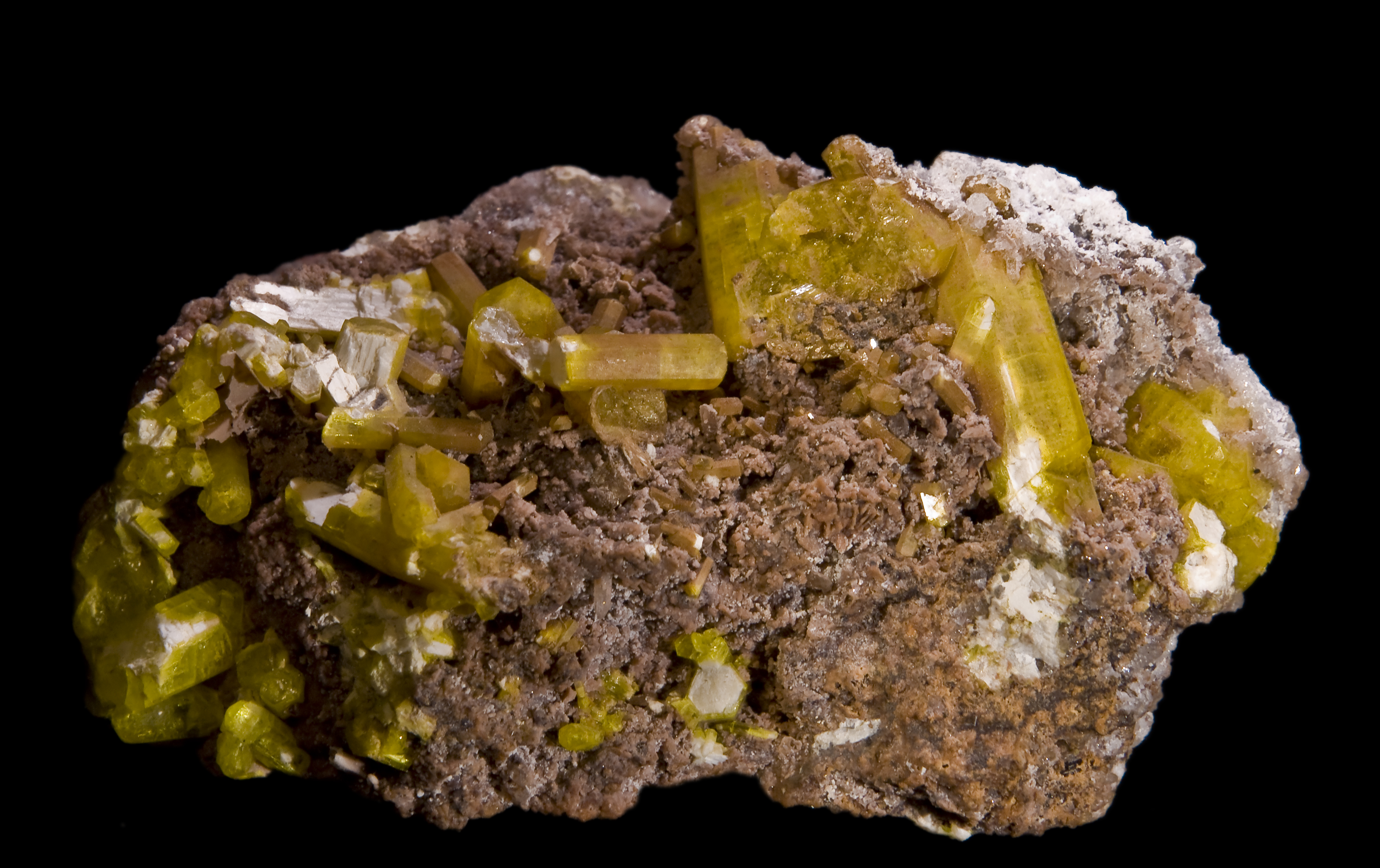
Ettringite, 6.5 × 3.2 cm. N'Chwaning Mines, Kalahari manganese fields, Northern Cape Province, South Africa

Ettringite was first described in 1874 by J. Lehmann, for an occurrence near the Ettringer Bellerberg Volcano, Ettringen, Rheinland-Pfalz, Germany. It occurs within metamorphically altered limestone adjacent to igneous intrusive rocks or within xenoliths. It also occurs as weathering crusts on larnite in the Hatrurim Formation of Israel. It occurs associated with portlandite, afwillite and hydrocalumite at Scawt Hill, Ireland and with afwillite, hydrocalumite, mayenite and gypsum in the Hatrurim Formation. It has also been reported from the Zeilberg quarry, Maroldsweisach, Bavaria; at Boisséjour, near Clermont-Ferrand, Puy-de-Dôme, Auvergne, France; the N’Chwaning mine, Kuruman district, Cape Province, South Africa; in the US, occurrences were found in spurrite-merwinite-gehlenite skarn at the 910 level of the Commercial quarry, Crestmore, Riverside County, California and in the Lucky Cuss mine, Tombstone, Arizona.

Ettringite is also sometimes referred in the ancient French literature as Candelot salt, or Candlot salt.

== Occurrence in cement ==
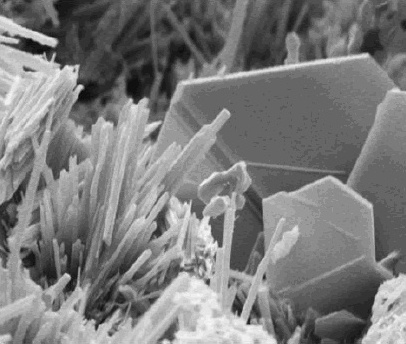
SEM image of fractured hardened cement paste, showing thin hexagonal plates of portlandite (calcium hydroxide) and needles of ettringite (micron scale)

In concrete chemistry, ettringite is a hexacalcium aluminate trisulfate hydrate, of general formula when noted as oxides:

6CaO·Al_{2}O_{3}·3SO_{3}·32H_{2}O

or

3CaO·Al_{2}O_{3}·3CaSO_{4}·32H_{2}O.

Ettringite is formed in the hydrated Portland cement system as a result of the reaction of tricalcium aluminate (C_{3}A) with calcium sulfate, both present in Portland cement.

C_{3}A + 3 CaSO_{4} → ettringite

The addition of gypsum (CaSO_{4}·2H_{2}O) to clinker during the grinding operation to obtain the crushed powder of Portland cement is essential to avoid the flash setting of concrete during its early hydration. Indeed, the tricalcium aluminate (C_{3}A) is the most reactive phase of the four main mineral phases present in Portland cement (C_{3}S, C_{2}S, C_{3}A, and C_{4}AF). C_{3}A hydration is very exothermic and also occurs very fast in the fresh concrete mix as the temperature quickly increases with the progress of the hydration reaction. The effect of gypsum addition is to promote the formation of a thin impervious film of ettringite at the surface of the C_{3}A grains, passivating their surface, and so slowing down their hydration. The addition of gypsum to Portland cement is needed to control the concrete setting.

Ettringite, the most prominent representative of AFt phases or (Al_{2}O_{3} − Fe_{2}O_{3} − tri), can also be synthesized in aqueous solution by reacting stoichiometric amounts of calcium oxide, aluminium oxide, and sulfate.

In the cement system, the presence of ettringite depends on the ratio of calcium sulfate to tri-calcium aluminate (C_{3}A); when this ratio is low, ettringite forms during early hydration and then converts to the calcium aluminate monosulfate (AFm phases or (Al_{2}O_{3} − Fe_{2}O_{3} − mono)). When the ratio is intermediate, only a portion of the ettringite converts to AFm and both can coexist, while ettringite is unlikely to convert to AFm at high ratios.

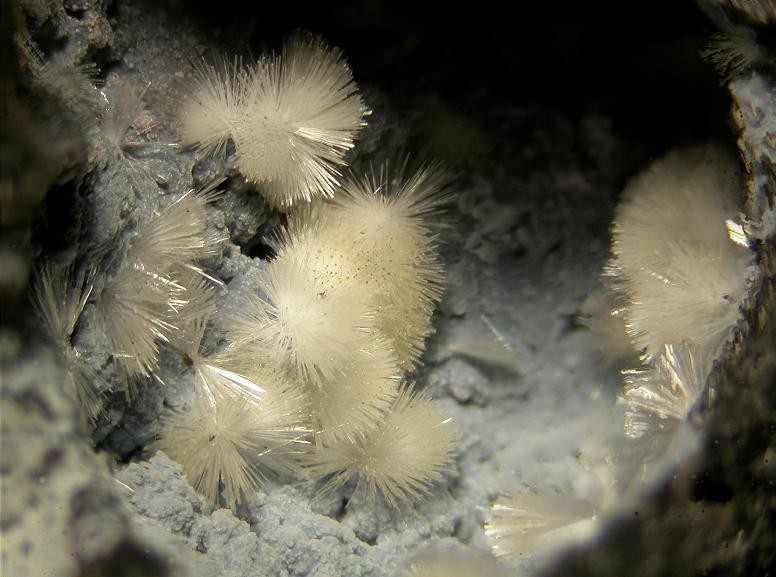
Fibroradiated ettringite needles on slag (Concordia smelter, Eschweiler, Aachen, Germany)

The following standard abbreviations are used to designate the different oxide phases in the cement chemist notation (CCN):

C = CaO
S = SiO_{2}
A = Al_{2}O_{3}
F = Fe_{2}O_{3}
S̅ = SO_{3}

H = H_{2}O
K = K_{2}O
N = Na_{2}O
m = mono
t = tri

In calcium sulfoaluminate (CSA) cement systems, sulfate availability and carbonate balance govern ettringite stability. Partial substitution of calcium sulfate with barium carbonate at low levels (up to 25%) accelerates hydration while maintaining ettringite formation. At higher substitution levels (above 50%), the immobilization of sulfate through barite (BaSO_{4}) formation reduces ettringite stability, leading to the formation of carbonate-AFm phases and strätlingite.

=== AFt and AFm phases ===
- AFt: abbreviation for "alumina, ferric oxide, tri-substituted" or (Al_{2}O_{3} − Fe_{2}O_{3} − tri). It represents a group of calcium aluminate hydrates. AFt has the general formula [Ca_{3}(Al,Fe)(OH)_{6}•12H_{2}O]_{2}•X_{3}•nH_{2}O where X represents a doubly charged anion or, sometimes, two singly charged anions. Ettringite is the most common and prominent member of the AFt group (X in this case denoting sulfate), and often simply called Alumina Ferrite tri-sulfate (AFt).
- AFm: abbreviation for "alumina, ferric oxide, mono-substituted" or (Al_{2}O_{3} − Fe_{2}O_{3} − mono). It represents another group of calcium aluminate hydrates with general formula [Ca_{2}(Al,Fe)(OH)_{6}]_{2}•X•nH_{2}O where X represents a singly charged anion or 'half' a doubly charged anion. X may be one of many anions. The most important anions involved in Portland cement hydration are hydroxyl (OH^{−}), sulfate (SO^{2−}_{4}), and carbonate (CO^{2−}_{3}).

== Structure ==
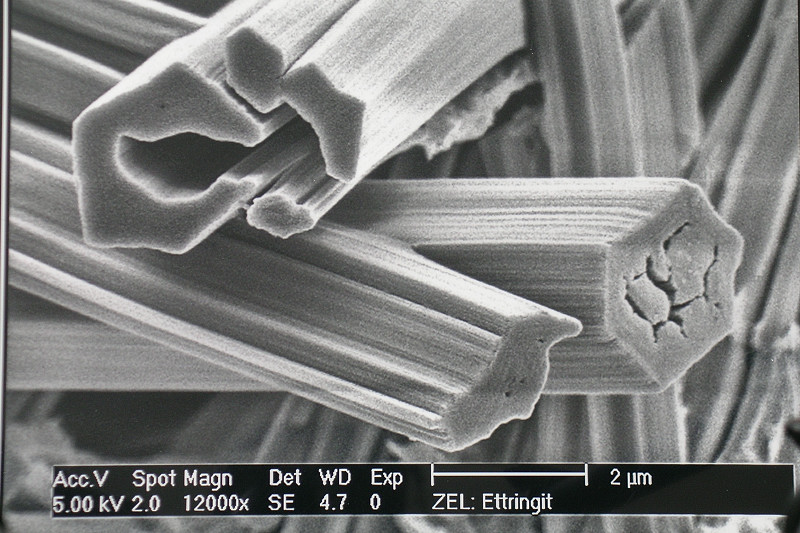
Scanning electron microscope (SEM) photograph of intertwined ettringite needles

The mineral ettringite has a structure that runs parallel to the c axis – the needle axis – in the middle of these two lie the sulfate ions and H_{2}O molecules, the space group is P31c. Ettringite crystal system is trigonal, crystals are elongated and in a needle like shape, occurrence of disorder or twining is common, which affects the intercolumn material. The first X-ray diffraction crystallographic study was done by Bannister, Hey and Bernal (1936), which found that the crystal unit cell is of a hexagonal form with a = 11.26 and c = 21.48 with space group P6_{3}/mmc and Z = 2, where Z is a number of formula units per unit cell. From observations on dehydration and chemical formulas there were suggestions of the structure being composed of Ca^{2+} and Al(OH)^{3−}_{6}, were between them lie SO^{2−}_{4} ions and H_{2}O molecules. Further X-ray studies ensued; namely Wellin (1956) which determined the crystal structure of thaumasite, and Besjak and Jelenic (1966) which gave confirmation of the structure nature of ettringite.

An ettringite sample extracted from Scawt Hill was analysed by C. E. Tilley, the crystal was 1.1 × 0.8 × 0.5 mm, with specific gravity of 1.772±0.002, possessed five prism faces of the form m{101̅0} and a small face a{112̅0}, with no pyramidal or basal faces. Upon X-ray diffraction a Laue diagram along the c-axis revealed a hexagonal axis with vertical planes of symmetry, this study showed that the structure has a hexagonal and not a rhombohedral lattice. Further studies conducted on synthetic ettringite by use of X-ray and powder diffraction confirmed earlier assumptions and analyses.

Upon analyzing the structure of both ettringite and thaumasite, it was deduced that both minerals have hexagonal structures, but different space groups.

Ettringite crystals have a P31c with a = 11.224 Å, c = 21,108 Å, while thaumasite crystals fall into space group P6_{3} with a=11.04 Å, c=10.39 Å While these two minerals form a solid solution, the difference in space groups lead to discontinuities in unit cell parameters Differences between structures of ettringite and thaumasite arise from the columns of cations and anions Ettringite cation columns are composed of Ca_{3}[Al(OH)_{6}·12H_{2}O]^{3+}, which run parallel to the c axis, and the other columns of sulfate anions and water molecules in channels parallel to these columns In contrast, thaumasite containing a hexacoordinated silicon complex of Si(OH)^{2–}_{6} (a rare octahedral configuration for Si) consists of a cylindrical column of Ca_{3}[Si(OH)_{6}·12H_{2}O]^{4+} in the c axis, with sulfate and carbonate anions in channels between these columns which contain water molecules as well.

== Further research ==
Ongoing research on ettringite and cement phase minerals is performed to find new ways to immobilize toxic anions (e.g., borate, selenate and arsenate) and heavy metals to avoid their dispersion in soils and the environment; this can be achieved by using the proper cement phases whose crystal lattice can accommodate these elements. For example, copper immobilization at high pH can be achieved through the formation of C-S-H/C-A-H and ettringite. The crystal structure of ettringite Ca_{6}Al_{2}(SO_{4})_{3}(OH)_{12}·26H_{2}O can incorporate a variety of divalent ions: Cu^{2+}, Pb^{2+}, Cd^{2+} and Zn^{2+}, which can substitute for Ca^{2+}.

== See also ==
- Cement
- Cement chemists notation
- Concrete
