= VBM =

VBM may refer to:

- Valence band maximum - highest energy of the electrons in the valence band of a (semiconducting) solid, see band gap
- Value-based management - an approach to corporate strategic management
- Voxel-based morphometry - a technique in neuroimaging analysis
- Virginia Beach Mariners
- The Virtual Beit Midrash of Yeshivat Har Etzion
- The Virtual Beit Midrash of Mercaz HaRav Kook
- Vote by mail
- Vibratory Ball Mills (VBMs), the High Energy Ball Milling (HEBM) method used for Energetically Modified Cement (EMC) activation
