= Cement chemist notation =

Abbreviated notation for chemical formulas of common oxides

Cement chemist notation (CCN) was developed to simplify the formulas cement chemists use on a daily basis. It is a shorthand way of writing the chemical formula of oxides of calcium, silicon, and various metals.

== Abbreviations of oxides ==
The main oxides present in cement (or in glass and ceramics) are abbreviated in the following way:

CCN	Actual formula	Name
C	CaO	Calcium oxide, or lime
S	SiO_{2}	Silicon dioxide, or silica
A	Al_{2}O_{3}	Aluminium oxide, or alumina
F	Fe_{2}O_{3}	Iron oxide, or rust
T	TiO_{2}	Titanium dioxide, or titania
M	MgO	Magnesium oxide, or periclase
K	K_{2}O	Potassium oxide
N	Na_{2}O	Sodium oxide
H	H_{2}O	Water
C̅	CO_{2}	Carbon dioxide
S̅	SO_{3}	Sulfur trioxide
P	P_{4}O_{10}	Phosphorus pentoxide

== Conversion of hydroxides in oxide and free water ==
For the sake of mass balance calculations, hydroxides present in hydrated phases found in hardened cement paste, such as in portlandite, Ca(OH)_{2}, must first be converted into oxide and water.

To better understand the conversion process of hydroxide anions in oxide and water, it is necessary to consider the autoprotolysis of the hydroxyl anions; it implies a proton exchange between two OH^{−}, like in a classical acid–base reaction:

+ → +

or also,

2 OH^{−} → O^{2−} + H_{2}O

For portlandite this gives thus the following mass balance:

Ca(OH)_{2} → CaO + H_{2}O

Thus portlandite can be written as CaO · H_{2}O or CH.

== Main phases in Portland cement before and after hydration ==
These oxides are used to build more complex compounds. The main crystalline phases described hereafter are related respectively to the composition of:

- Clinker and non-hydrated Portland cement, and;
- Hardened cement pastes obtained after hydration and cement setting.

=== Clinker and non-hydrated Portland cement ===
Four main phases are present in the clinker and in the non-hydrated Portland cement.
They are formed at high temperature (1,450 °C) in the cement kiln and are the following:

CCN	Actual formula	Name	Mineral phase
C_{3}S	3 CaO · SiO_{2}	Tricalcium silicate	Alite
C_{2}S	2 CaO · SiO_{2}	Dicalcium silicate	Belite
C_{3}A	3 CaO · Al_{2}O_{3}	Tricalcium aluminate	Aluminate or Celite
C_{4}AF	4 CaO · Al_{2}O_{3} · Fe_{2}O_{3}	Tetracalcium alumino ferrite	Ferrite

The four compounds referred as C_{3}S, C_{2}S, C_{3}A and C_{4}AF are known as the main crystalline phases of Portland cement. The phase composition of a particular cement can be quantified through a complex set of calculation known as the Bogue formula.

To avoid the flash setting of concrete, due to the very fast hydration of the tricalcium aluminate (C_{3}A), 2–5 wt. % calcium sulfate is interground with the cement clinker to prepare the cement powder. In cement chemist notation, CaSO_{4} (anhydrite) is abbreviated as CS̅, and CaSO_{4}·2H_{2}O (gypsum) as CS̅H_{2}.

Similarly, in case of a limestone filler addition, CaCO_{3}, or CaO·CO_{2}, can be noted CC̅.

=== Hydrated cement paste ===
Hydration products formed in hardened cement pastes (also known as HCPs) are more complicated, because many of these products have nearly the same formula and some are solid solutions with overlapping formulas. Some examples are given below:

CCN	Actual formula	Name or mineral phase
CH	Ca(OH)_{2} or CaO · H_{2}O	Calcium hydroxide (portlandite)
C-S-H	0.6–2.0 CaO · SiO_{2} · 0.9–2.5 H_{2}O, with variable composition within this range, and often also incorporating partial substitution of Al for Si	Calcium silicate hydrate
C-A-H	Phase more complex than C-S-H	Calcium aluminate hydrate
C-A-S-H	This is even more complex than C-S-H and C-A-H	Calcium aluminate silicate hydrate
AFt	C_{6}AS̅_{3}H_{32}, sometimes with substitution of Fe for Al, and/or CO^{2−}_{3} for SO^{2−}_{4}	Calcium trisulfoaluminate hydrate, or ettringite
AFm	C_{4}AS̅H_{12}, often with substitution of Fe for Al, and/or various other anions such as OH^{−} or CO^{2−}_{3} for SO^{2−}_{4}	Calcium monosulfoaluminate
C_{3}AH_{6}	3CaO · Al_{2}O_{3} · 6 H_{2}O	Hydrogarnet

The hyphens in C-S-H indicate a calcium silicate hydrate phase of variable composition, while 'CSH' would indicate a calcium silicate phase, CaH_{2}SiO_{4}.

== Use in ceramics, glass, and oxide chemistry ==
The cement chemist notation is not restricted to cement applications but is in fact a more general notation of oxide chemistry applicable to other domains than cement chemistry sensu stricto.

For instance, in ceramics applications, the kaolinite formula can also be written in terms of oxides, thus the corresponding formula for kaolinite,

Al_{2}Si_{2}O_{5}(OH)_{4},

is

Al_{2}O_{3} · 2 SiO_{2} · 2 H_{2}O

or in CCN

AS_{2}H_{2}.

== Possible use of CCN in mineralogy ==
Although not a very developed practice in mineralogy, some chemical reactions involving silicate and oxide in the melt or in hydrothermal systems, and silicate weathering processes could also be successfully described by applying the cement chemist notation to silicate mineralogy.

An example could be the formal comparison of belite hydration and forsterite serpentinisation dealing both with the hydration of two structurally similar earth -alkaline silicates, Ca_{2}SiO_{4} and Mg_{2}SiO_{4}, respectively.

Calcium system
belite hydration:

+ → +	Reaction 4a

2 C_{2}S + 4 H → C_{3}S_{2}H_{3} + CH	Reaction 4b

Magnesium system
forsterite serpentinisation:

+ → +	Reaction 4c

2 M_{2}S + 3 H → M_{3}S_{2}H_{2} + MH	Reaction 4d

The ratio Ca/Si (C/S) and Mg/Si (M/S) decrease from 2 for the dicalcium and dimagnesium silicate reagents to 1.5 for the hydrated silicate products of the hydration reaction. In other term, the C-S-H or the serpentine are less rich in Ca and Mg respectively. This is why the reaction leads to the elimination of the excess of portlandite (Ca(OH)_{2}) and brucite (Mg(OH)_{2}), respectively, out of the silicate system, giving rise to the crystallization of both hydroxides as separate phases.

The rapid reaction of belite hydration in the setting of cement is formally "chemically analogue" to the slow natural hydration of forsterite (the magnesium end-member of olivine) leading to the formation of serpentine and brucite in nature. However, the kinetic of hydration of poorly crystallized artificial belite is much swifter than the slow conversion/weathering of well crystallized Mg-olivine under natural conditions.

This comparison suggests that mineralogists could probably also benefit from the concise formalism of the cement chemist notation in their works.

== See also ==
- Hydration of belite in cement (analogous to forsterite hydration)
- Hydration reaction of forsterite (olivine) in serpentinisation
