= Scawt Hill =

Mountain in Northern Ireland

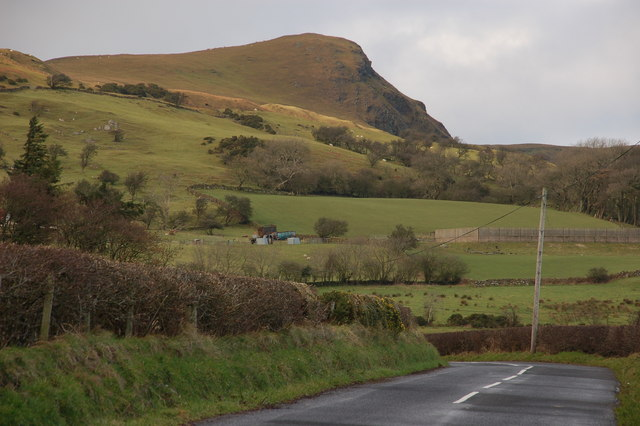
- Scawt Hill from the Sallagh Road, Cairncastle

Highest point
- Elevation: 378 m (1,240 ft)
- Coordinates: 54°54′38″N 5°54′55″W

Geography
- Location within Northern Ireland
- Location: County Antrim, Northern Ireland
- OSI/OSNI grid: D338090
- Topo map: OSNI Discoverer 9

Geology
- Mountain type: Volcanic plug

Scawt Hill is a volcanic plug in County Antrim, Northern Ireland, in the borough of Larne, 5 km from the village of Ballygally.

It gets its name from the Ulster Scots "scawd" meaning scaly, scabby or rugged. Alternatively, 'scawt' meaning scruffy and contemptible, and when applied to rocks, covered in barnacles.

== Discovery of minerals ==
Scawt Hill is notable for being the type locality for several hydrated calcium silicates, that is, the place where they were first identified. These minerals were formed when the existing chalk of the area was intensely altered by the intrusion of the feeder tube of an ancient volcano, now long since cooled and eroded to its roots.

Minerals that were first discovered at Scawt Hill:

- Larnite (calcium orthosilicate) a natural form of belite discovered in 1929 and named after Larne, the nearest town
- Scawtite in 1929
- Portlandite in 1933
- Hydrocalumite in 1934
- Rankinite in 1942
- Bredigite in 1948

In all, 28 minerals have been found at this site.

== Volcanic plugs in Northern Ireland ==
Over 30 volcanic plugs are dotted through Northern Ireland, mostly along the Antrim coast like Scawt Hill, although they are relatively rare throughout the rest of Ireland. Volcanic plugs are often easy to spot. Their harder rock erodes away more slowly than their surroundings so they rise above the landscape as a hill.

The largest volcanic plug in Northern Ireland is the oval-shaped Slemish. At its widest, Slemish is over 1 km in diameter. Scawt Hill is more of a typically sized example. This olivine dolerite plug is 270 m x 180 m wide and rises 30 – 60 m above the Cretaceous white limestone (chalk), although the Antrim plateau around it is typically basalt.

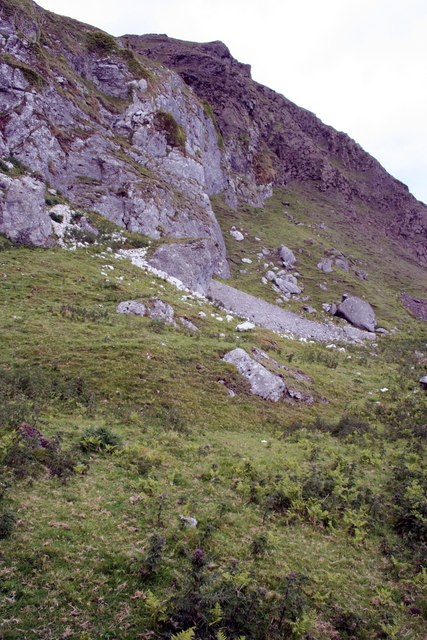
At Scawt Hill, Cretaceous chalk, the white rock to the left of the photo, has been intruded by molten rock which cooled to dolerite, the darker rock to the right

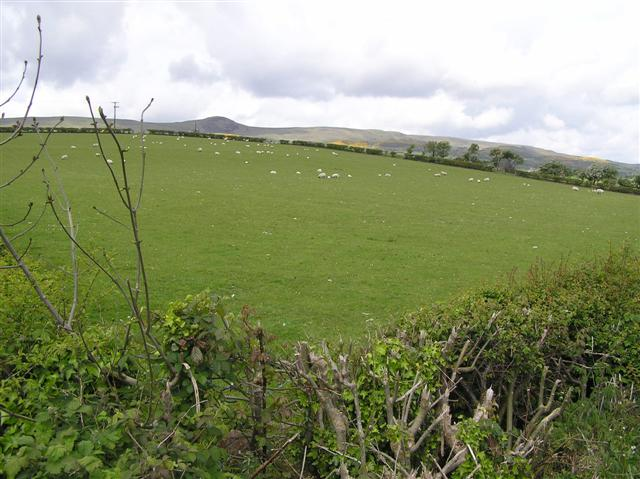
Scawt Hill from Ballygally

Due to the volcanic intrusion the chalk around Scawt Hill has been transformed by high temperature and low pressure thermal metamorphism, developing the large and unusual range of calc-siliate minerals that have attracted interest. The rocks inside the vent were also changed by the contact, producing a sequence of alkali mafic igneous rocks as the magma assimilated the chalk, reducing the silica in the magma and leading to larger grain size near the contact.

== Early description of Scawt Hill ==
Cecil Edgar Tilley, writing for the Mineralogical Magazine in 1929, was the first to appreciate the potential of the dolerite-limestone contact at Scawt Hill. Tilley named scawtite and larnite, and later, rankinite, and his writings inspired many others to find similar relationships between rocks worldwide.

== Protected status ==
In 1995, Scawt Hill was categorised as an Area of Special Scientific Interest, not just for its international importance to geology, but for its plant life, where chalky and alkaline conditions are in close proximity, and for its conditions for breeding birds.

== Ulster Way ==
Scawt Hill is on the Ulster Way, part of a series of walking routes which encircle Ulster. It is passed by between the Black Hill and the Sallagh Braes.

== RAF plane crash ==
17 September 1943 a Royal Air Force, Vickers Wellington (W5647) had departed from RAF Limavady on a training flight over the Irish Sea. The weather at RAF Limavady was getting worse and the crew was ordered to return to base. While flying low the aircraft crashed into the side of Scawt Hill, killing one of the six crew.

== See also ==
- Geology of Northern Ireland
- Volcanic plugs of Northern Ireland
