= Tricalcium aluminate =

Compound associated with Portland cement

Names
- Other names aluminate, C_{3}A

Identifiers
CAS Number	12042-78-3; 161063-05-4
3D model (JSmol)	Interactive image
ChemSpider	32816424
ECHA InfoCard	100.031.744
EC Number	234-932-6
PubChem CID	92043201
CompTox Dashboard (EPA)	DTXSID6051223
- InChI: InChI=1S/2Al.3Ca.6O/q2*+3;3*+2;6*-2 Key: HOOWDPSAHIOHCC-UHFFFAOYSA-N
- SMILES: [O-][Al-]0([O-])O[Al-]([O-])([O-])O[Al-]([O-])([O-])O[Al-]([O-])([O-])O[Al-]([O-])([O-])O[Al-]([O-])([O-])O0.[Ca+2].[Ca+2].[Ca+2].[Ca+2].[Ca+2].[Ca+2].[Ca+2].[Ca+2].[Ca+2]

Properties
Chemical formula	Ca_{3}Al_{2}O_{6}, or 3CaO·Al_{2}O_{3}
Molar mass	270.193 g/mol
Density	3.064 g/cm^{3}
Melting point	1,542 °C (2,808 °F; 1,815 K) (decomposes)

Hazards
- GHS labelling
Pictograms	(GHS07: Exclamation mark)
Signal word	Warning
Hazard statements	H319
Precautionary statements	P264, P280, P305+P351+P338, P313
- Except where otherwise noted, data are given for materials in their standard state (at 25 °C [77 °F], 100 kPa). verify (what is ?) Infobox references

Tricalcium aluminate Ca_{3}Al_{2}O_{6}, often formulated as 3CaO·Al_{2}O_{3} to highlight the proportions of the oxides from which it is made, is the most basic of the calcium aluminates. It does not occur in nature (with the exception of meteorites), but is an important mineral phase in Portland cement.

== Properties ==
Tricalcium aluminate forms upon heating a 3:1 mixture of calcium oxide and aluminium oxide above 1300 °C. The crystals are cubic, with unit cell dimension 1.5263 nm and has density 3064 kg·m^{−3}. It melts with decomposition at 1542 °C. The unit cell contains 8 cyclic Al_{6}O_{18}^{18−} anions, which can be considered to consist of 6 corner sharing AlO_{4} tetrahedra. The structure of pure liquid tricalcium aluminate contains mostly AlO_{4} tetrahedra in an infinite network, with a slightly higher concentration of bridging oxygens than expected from the composition and around 10% unconnected AlO_{4} monomers and Al_{2}O_{7} dimers.

In Portland cement clinker, tricalcium aluminate occurs as an "interstitial phase", crystallizing from the melt. Its presence in clinker is solely due to the need to obtain liquid at the peak kiln processing temperature (1400–1450 °C), facilitating the formation of the desired silicate phases. Apart from this benefit, its effects on cement properties are mostly undesirable. It forms an impure solid solution phase, with 15-20% of the aluminium atoms replaced by silicon and iron, and with variable amounts of alkali metal atoms replacing calcium, depending upon the availability of alkali oxides in the melt. The impure form has at least four polymorphs:

Alkali % m/m	Designation	Crystal
0–1.0	C_{I}	Cubic
1.0-2.4	C_{II}	Cubic
3.7-4.6	O	Orthorhombic
4.6-5.7	M	Monoclinic

Typical chemical compositions are:

Oxide	Mass % Cubic	Mass % Orthorhombic
SiO_{2}	3.7	4.3
Al_{2}O_{3}	31.3	28.9
Fe_{2}O_{3}	5.1	6.6
CaO	56.6	53.9
MgO	1.4	1.2
Na_{2}O	1.0	0.6
K_{2}O	0.7	4.0
TiO_{2}	0.2	0.5

== Effect on cement properties ==
In keeping with its high basicity, tricalcium aluminate reacts most strongly with water of all the calcium aluminates, and it is also the most reactive of the Portland clinker phases. Its hydration to phases of the form Ca_{2}AlO_{3}(OH) · n H_{2}O leads to the phenomenon of "flash set" (instantaneous set), and a large amount of heat is generated. To avoid this, Portland-type cements include a small addition of calcium sulfate (typically 4-8%). Sulfate ions in solution lead to the formation of an insoluble layer of ettringite (3CaO • Al_{2}O_{3} • 3CaSO_{4} · 32 H_{2}O over the surface of the aluminate crystals, passivating them. The aluminate then reacts slowly to form AFm phases of general composition 3CaO • Al_{2}O_{3} • CaSO_{4} · 12 H_{2}O. These hydrates contribute little to strength development.

Tricalcium aluminate is associated with three important effects that can reduce the durability of concrete:

- heat release, which can cause spontaneous overheating in large masses of concrete. Where necessary, tricalcium aluminate levels are reduced to control this effect.
- sulfate attack, in which sulfate solutions to which the concrete is exposed react with the AFm phases to form ettringite. This reaction is expansive, and can disrupt mature concrete. Where concrete is to be placed in contact with, for example, sulfate-laden ground waters, either a "sulfate-resisting" cement (with low levels of tricalcium aluminate) is used, or slag is added to the cement or to the concrete mix. The slag contributes sufficient aluminium to suppress formation of ettringite.
- delayed ettringite formation, where concrete is cured at temperatures above the decomposition temperature of ettringite (about 65 °C). On cooling, expansive ettringite formation takes place.

Because they are even more basic, the alkali-loaded polymorphs are correspondingly more reactive. Appreciable amounts (>1%) in cement make set control difficult, and the cement becomes excessively hygroscopic. The cement powder flowability is reduced, and air-set lumps tend to form. They withdraw water from gypsum on storage of the cement, leading to false set. For this reason, their formation is avoided wherever possible. It is more energetically favorable for sodium and potassium to form sulfates and chlorides in the kiln, but if insufficient sulfate ion is present, any surplus alkalis congregate in the aluminate phase. The feed and fuel in the kiln system are preferably controlled chemically to keep the sulfate and alkalis in balance. However, this stoichiometry is only maintained if there is substantial surplus oxygen in the kiln atmosphere: if "reducing conditions" set in, then sulfur is lost as SO_{2}, and reactive aluminates start to form. This is readily monitored by tracking the clinker sulfate level on an hour-to-hour basis.

== Hydration ==
Tricalcium aluminate hydrates in the process of forming Portland cement. Using X-ray diffraction, two hydrates form, the hexahydrate abbreviated C3AH6 and a nonadecahydrate abbreviated C4AH19. In the presence of gypsum, a component of typical clinkers, the sulfate (S) forms with the formula C4ASH12.
