= Portlandite =

Calcium hydroxide mineral

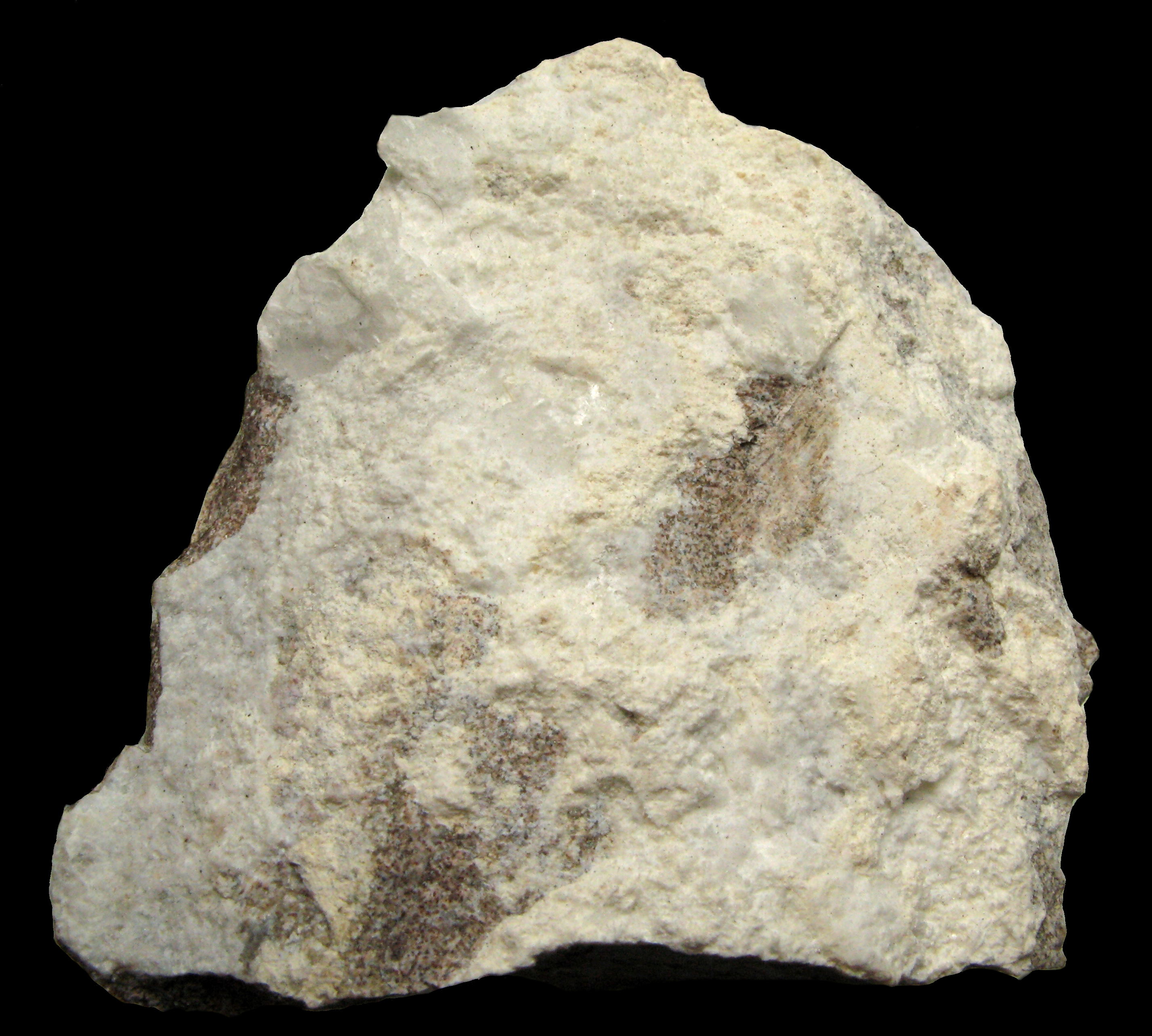
- Portlandite and ettringite

General
- Category: Oxide mineral
- Formula: Ca(OH)_{2}
- IMA symbol: Por
- Strunz classification: 4.FE.05
- Dana classification: 06.02.01.04; Brucite group
- Crystal system: Trigonal
- Crystal class: Hexagonal scalenohedral (3̅m); H-M symbol: (3̅ 2/m)
- Space group: P3̅m1
- Unit cell: a = 3.589 Å, c = 4.911 Å; Z = 1

Identification
- Color: Colorless, white to greenish white
- Crystal habit: Hexagonal plates; commonly fibrous, powdery, massive.
- Cleavage: Perfect on {0001}
- Tenacity: Sectile with flexible cleavage plates
- Mohs scale hardness: 2
- Luster: Pearly on cleavages
- Diaphaneity: Transparent
- Specific gravity: 2.23
- Optical properties: Uniaxial (−)
- Refractive index: n_{ω} = 1.574 n_{ε} = 1.547
- Birefringence: δ = 0.027
- Solubility: Soluble in water producing an alkaline solution
- Alters to: Alters to CaCO_{3} on exposure to CO_{2} bearing waters

Portlandite is a hydroxide-bearing mineral typically included in the oxide mineral class. It is the naturally occurring form of calcium hydroxide (Ca(OH)_{2}) and the calcium analogue of brucite (Mg(OH)_{2}).

== Occurrence ==
Portlandite occurs in a variety of environments. At the type location in Northern Ireland, it occurs as an alteration of calc–silicate rocks by contact metamorphism of larnite–spurrite. It occurs as fumarole deposits in the Vesuvius area. In Jebel Awq, Oman, it occurs as precipitates from an alkaline spring emanating from ultramafic bedrock. In the Chelyabinsk coal basin of Russia it is produced by combustion of coal seams and similarly by spontaneous combustion of bitumen in the Hatrurim Formation of the Negev desert in Israel and the Maqarin area, Jordan. It also occurs in the manganese mining area of Kuruman, Cape Province, South Africa in the Kalahari Desert where it occurs as large crystals and masses.

It occurs in association with afwillite, calcite, larnite, spurrite, halite, brownmillerite, hydrocalumite, mayenite and ettringite.

It was first described in 1933 for an occurrence at Scawt Hill, Larne, County Antrim, Northern Ireland. It was named portlandite because the chemical calcium hydroxide is a common hydration phase of Portland cement.
