= Cement clinker =

Main component of Portland cement

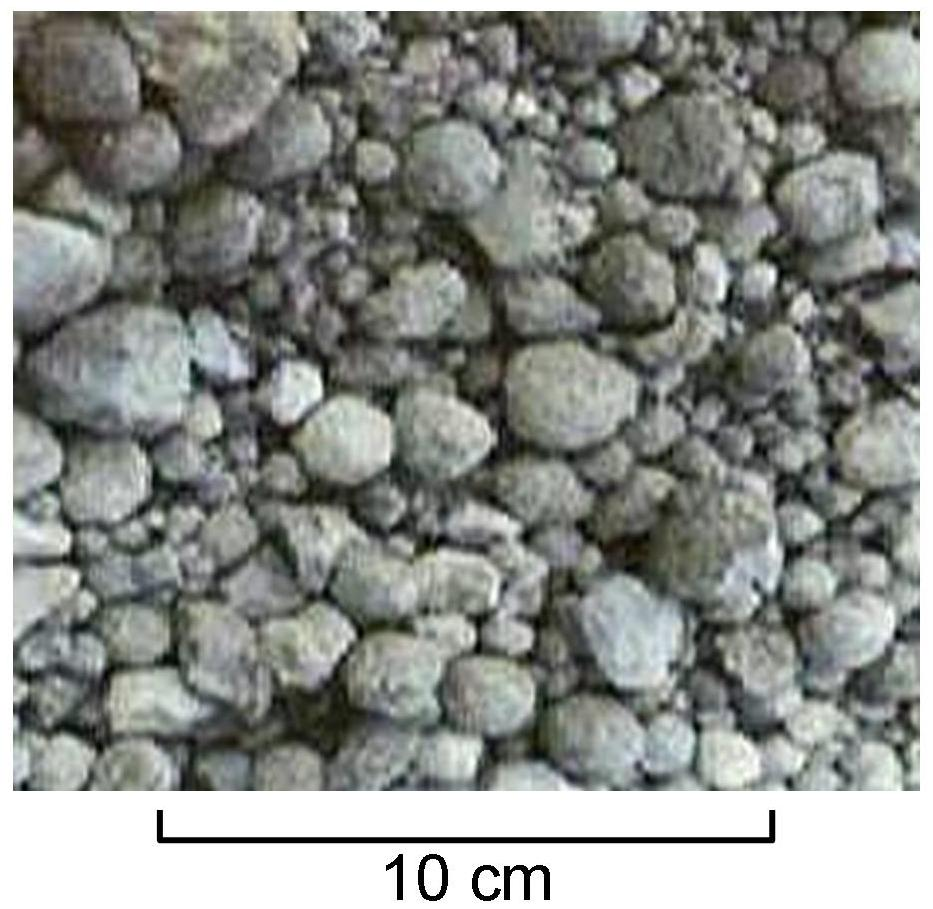
Typical clinker nodules

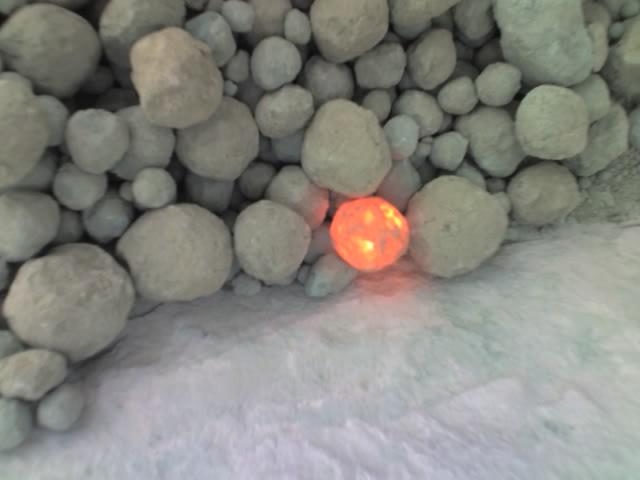
Hot clinker

Cement clinker is a solid material produced as an intermediary product in Portland cement manufacturing. Clinker occurs as lumps or nodules, usually 3 millimetres (0.12 in) to 25 millimetres (0.98 in) in diameter. It is produced by sintering (fusing without melting to the point of liquefaction) limestone and aluminosilicate materials such as clay during the cement kiln stage.

== Composition and preparation ==
Portland clinker consists of four minerals: two calcium silicates, alite (Ca_{3}SiO_{5}) and belite (Ca_{2}SiO_{4}), along with tricalcium aluminate (Ca_{3}Al_{2}O_{6}) and calcium aluminoferrite (Ca_{2}(Al,Fe)_{2}O_{5}). These minerals are produced commercially by heating clays and limestone at high temperature.

The major raw material is usually limestone mixed with a second material containing clay as a source of alumino-silicate. An impure limestone containing clay or silicon dioxide (SiO_{2}) can be used. The calcium carbonate (CaCO_{3}) content of these limestones can be as low as 80% by weight. During the calcination process that occurs in the production of clinker, limestone is broken into lime (calcium oxide), which is incorporated into the final clinker product, and carbon dioxide.

The second raw material depends on the purity of the limestone. Second raw materials used include clay, shale, sand, iron ore, bauxite, fly ash and slag.

Portland clinker is made by heating a homogeneous mixture of raw materials in a rotary kiln at high temperature. The products of the chemical reaction aggregate at their sintering temperature, about 1,450 °C (2,640 °F). Aluminium oxide and iron oxide are present only as a flux to reduce the sintering temperature and contribute little to the cement strength.

For special cements, such as low heat (LH) and sulfate resistant (SR) types, it is necessary to limit the amount of tricalcium aluminate formed.

The clinker and its hydration reactions are characterized and studied in detail by many techniques, including calorimetry, strength development, X-ray diffraction, scanning electron microscope and atomic force microscopy.

== Uses ==
Portland cement clinker (abbreviated k in the European norms) is ground to a fine powder and used as the binder in many cement products. A small amount of gypsum (less than 5 wt.%) must be added to avoid the flash setting of the tricalcium aluminate (Ca_{3}Al_{2}O_{6}), the most reactive mineral phase (exothermic hydration reaction) in Portland clinker. It may also be combined with other active ingredients or cement additions to produce other types of cement including, following the European EN 197-1 standard:

- CEM I: pure Portland clinker (Ordinary Portland Cement, OPC)
- CEM II: composite cements with a limited addition of limestone filler or blast furnace slag (BFS)
- CEM III: BFS-OPC blast furnace cements
- CEM IV: pozzolanic cements
- CEM V: composite cements (with large additions of BFS, fly ashes, or silica fume)

Clinker is one of the ingredients of an artificial rock imitating limestone and called pulhamite after its inventor, James Pulham (1820–1898). Other ingredients were Portland cement and sand. Pulhamite can be extremely convincing and was popular in creating natural looking rock gardens in the nineteenth century.

Clinker, if stored in dry conditions, can be kept for several months without appreciable loss of quality. Because of this, and because it can be easily handled by ordinary mineral handling equipment, clinker is internationally traded in large quantities. Cement manufacturers purchasing clinker usually grind it as an addition to their own clinker at their cement plants. Manufacturers also ship clinker to grinding plants in areas where cement-making raw materials are not available.

== Grinding aids ==
Gypsum is added to clinker primarily as an additive preventing the flash settings of the cement, but it is also very effective to facilitate the grinding of clinker by preventing agglomeration and coating of the powder at the surface of balls and mill wall.

Organic compounds are also often added as grinding aids to avoid powder agglomeration. Triethanolamine (TEA) is commonly used at 0.1 wt. % and has proved to be very effective. Other additives are sometimes used, such as ethylene glycol, oleic acid, and dodecylbenzenesulfonate.

== Hydration ==
Upon addition of water, clinker minerals react to form different types of hydrates and "set" (harden) as the hydrated cement paste becomes concrete. The calcium silicate hydrates (C-S-H) (hydrates of alite and belite minerals) represent the main "glue" components of the concrete. After initial setting the concrete continues to harden and to develop its mechanical strength.

The first 28 days are the most critical for the hardening. The concrete does not dry but one says that it sets and hardens. The cement is a hydraulic binder whose hydration requires water. It can perfectly set under water. Water is essential to its hardening and water losses must be avoided at the young age to avoid the development of cracks. Young concrete is protected against desiccation (evaporation of unreacted water). Traditional methods for preventing desiccation involve covering the product with wet burlap or use of plastic sheeting.

For larger projects, such as highways, the surface is sprayed with a solution of curing compound that leaves a water-impermeable coating.

== Contribution to global warming ==
As of 2018, cement production contributed about 8% of all carbon emissions worldwide, contributing substantially to global warming. Most of those emissions were produced in the clinker manufacturing process.

== Research ==
In 2026, researchers introduced an alternative production process for producing belite cement. Electrochemical CSH production uses a two stage process. CSH is produced at 140 °F (60 °C), while the second converts the CSH into belite at 1200 °F (650 °C). This process requires some 70% less energy than the conventional process. This process has also been used to produce clinker from waste cement recovered from demolished concrete.

Making belite clinker from recycled cement emitted only some 20 kg (44 lb) of CO₂ per ton, compared to roughly 800 kg (1,764 lb) of CO_{2} per ton, nearly 98% less than the conventional approach.

The electrochemical reactions also generated hydrogen gas as a byproduct, which could be burned to supply the thermal energy required for the belite conversion.

== See also ==
- Clinker (waste)
- Environmental impact of concrete
