= Jennite =

Inosilicate alteration mineral in metamorphosed limestone and in skarn

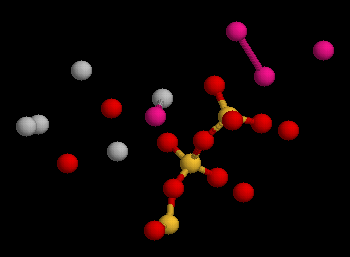
- Crystal structure of jennite: elementary unit cell viewed in 3D

General
- Category: Silicate mineral
- Formula: Ca_{9}Si_{6}O_{18}(OH)_{6}·8H_{2}O
- IMA symbol: Jnn
- Strunz classification: 9.DG.20
- Crystal system: Triclinic
- Crystal class: Pinacoidal (1̅) (same H-M symbol)
- Space group: P1̅
- Unit cell: a = 10.56, b = 7.25 c = 10.81 [Å]; α = 99.7° β = 97.67°, γ = 110.07°; Z = 1

Identification
- Formula mass: 1,063 g/mol
- Color: White
- Crystal habit: Blade shaped crystals, fibrous aggregates, platy – sheet forms
- Cleavage: Distinct on [001]
- Mohs scale hardness: 3.5
- Luster: Vitreous (glassy)
- Streak: White
- Diaphaneity: Transparent to translucent
- Density: 2.32–2.33
- Optical properties: Biaxial (−)
- Refractive index: n_{α} = 1.548 – 1.552 n_{β} = 1.562 – 1.564 n_{γ} = 1.570 – 1.571
- Birefringence: δ = 0.022
- 2V angle: Measured: 74°
- Ultraviolet fluorescence: Weak white

Jennite is a calcium silicate hydrate mineral of general chemical formula: Ca_{9}Si_{6}O_{18}(OH)_{6}·8H_{2}O.

Jennite occurs as an alteration mineral in metamorphosed limestone and skarn. It typically occurs as vein and open space fillings as a late mineral phase. It also occurs in hydrated cement paste.

A first specimen of jennite found in 1966 at the Crestmore quarries (Crestmore, Riverside County, California, US) was analysed and identified as a new mineral by Carpenter in 1966 (Carpenter, 1966). They named it in honor of its discoverer: Clarence Marvin Jenni (1896–1973) director of the Geological Museum at the University of Missouri.

In contrast to the first analysis made by Carpenter, jennite was found to not contain appreciable amount of sodium when the Crestmore specimen was reexamined.

The structure of jennite is made of three distinct modules: ribbons of edge-sharing calcium octahedra, silicate chains of wollastonite-type running along the b axis, and additional calcium octahedra on inversion centers. The hydroxyl groups are bonded to three calcium cations while no SiOH groups are observed.

Jennite transforms to metajennite at 70–90 °C (158–194 °F) by losing four water molecules.

== Cement chemistry ==
Jennite is often used in thermodynamical calculations to represent the pole of the less evolved calcium silicate hydrate (C-S-H). The value of its atomic Ca/Si or molecular CaO/SiO_{2} (C/S) ratio is 1.50 (9/6), as directly calculated from its elementary composition formula. Tobermorite represents the more evolved pole with a C/S ratio of 0.83 (5/6).

== See also ==
- Other calcium silicate hydrate (C-S-H) minerals:
  - Afwillite
  - Gyrolite
  - Thaumasite
  - Tobermorite
- Other calcium aluminium silicate hydrate (C-A-S-H) minerals:
  - Tacharanite
  - Hydrogarnet
  - Hydrogrossular
  - Hydrotalcite
  - Katoite
