= Afwillite =

Nesosilicate alteration mineral also sometimes found in hydrated cement paste

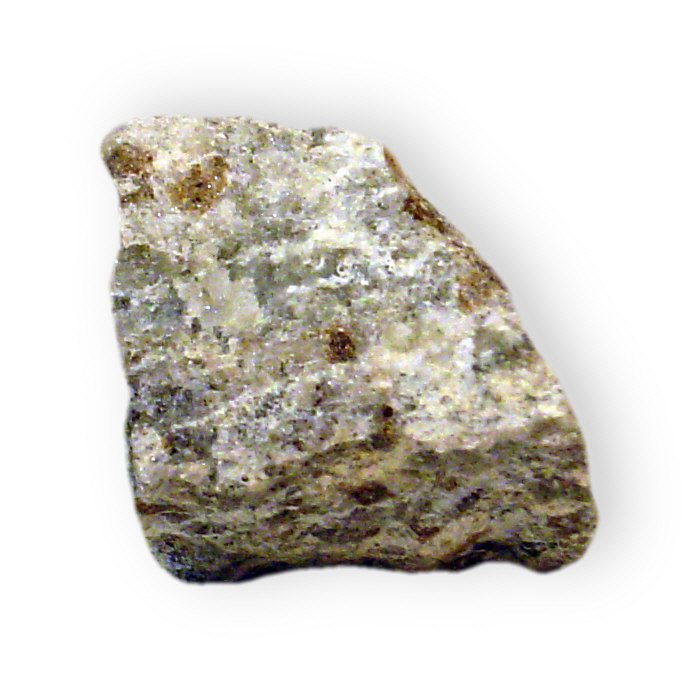
- Afwillite from Crestmore Quarry, Riverside County, California

General
- Category: Nesosilicates
- Formula: Ca_{3}(SiO_{3}OH)_{2}·2H_{2}O
- IMA symbol: Afw
- Strunz classification: 9.AG.75
- Crystal system: Monoclinic
- Crystal class: Domatic (m) (same H-M symbol)
- Space group: Cc
- Unit cell: a = 16.278(1), b = 5.6321(4) c = 13.236(1) [Å]; β = 134.9°; Z = 4

Identification
- Color: Colorless, white
- Crystal habit: Prismatic (striated), tabular, radial fibrous, massive
- Cleavage: Perfect along [101̅], good along [100]
- Fracture: Conchoidal
- Tenacity: Brittle
- Mohs scale hardness: 3–4
- Luster: Vitreous
- Streak: White
- Diaphaneity: Transparent to translucent
- Specific gravity: 2.630
- Optical properties: Biaxial (+)
- Refractive index: n_{α} = 1.617 n_{β} = 1.620 n_{γ} = 1.634
- Birefringence: δ = 0.0167
- 2V angle: Measured: 50° to 56°
- Dispersion: r < v
- Other characteristics: Piezoelectric

Afwillite is a calcium hydroxide nesosilicate mineral with formula Ca_{3}(SiO_{3}OH)_{2}·2H_{2}O. It occurs as glassy, colorless to white prismatic monoclinic crystals. Its Mohs scale hardness is between 3 and 4. It occurs as an alteration mineral in contact metamorphism of limestone. It occurs in association with apophyllite, natrolite, thaumasite, merwinite, spurrite, gehlenite, ettringite, portlandite, hillebrandite, foshagite, brucite and calcite.

It was first described in 1925 for an occurrence in the Dutoitspan Mine, Kimberley, South Africa and was named for Alpheus Fuller Williams (1874–1953), a past official of the De Beers diamond company.

Afwillite is typically found in veins of spurrite and it belongs to the nesosilicate sub-class. It is monoclinic, its space group is P2 and its point group is 2.

== Formation ==
It is suggested that afwillite forms in fractured veins of the mineral spurrite. Jennite, afwillite, oyelite and calcite are all minerals that form in layers within spurrite veins. It appears that afwillite, as well as calcite, forms from precipitated fluids. Jennite is actually an alteration of afwillite, but both formed from calcium silicates through hydration. Laboratory studies determined that afwillite forms at a temperature below 200 °C (392 °F), usually around 100 °C. Afwillite and spurrite are formed through contact metamorphism of limestone. Contact metamorphism is caused by the interaction of rock with heat and/or fluids from a nearby crystallizing silicate magma.

=== Structure and properties ===
Afwillite has a complex monoclinic structure, and the silicon tetrahedra in the crystal structure are held together by hydrogen bonds. It has perfect cleavage parallel to its (101) and poor cleavage parallel to its (100) faces. It is biaxial and its 2V angle, the measurement from one optical axis to the other optical axis, is 50 – 56 degrees. When viewed under crossed polarizers in a petrographic microscope, it displays first-order orange colors, giving a maximum birefringence of 0.0167 (determined by using the Michel–Levy chart). Afwillite is optically positive. Additionally, it has a prismatic crystal habit. Under a microscope afwillite looks like wollastonite, which is in the same family as afwillite.

Afwillite is composed of double chains that consist of calcium and silicon polyhedral connected to each other by sharing corners and edges. This causes continuous sheets to form parallel to its Miller index [1̅01] faces. The sheets are bonded together by hydrogen bonds and are all connected by Ca-Si-O bonds (Malik & Jeffery, 1976). Each calcium atom is in 6-fold octahedral coordination with the oxygen, and the silicon is in 4-fold tetrahedral coordination around the oxygen. Around each silicon there is one OH group and there are three oxygens that neighbor them. The silicon tetrahedra are arranged so that they share an edge with calcium(1), and silicon(2) shares edges with the calcium(2) and calcium(3) polyhedral. The silicon tetrahedra are held together by the OH group and hydrogen bonding occurs between the hydrogen in the OH and the silicon tetrahedra. Hydrogen bonding is caused because the positive ion, hydrogen, is attracted to negatively charge ions which, in this case, are the silicon tetrahedra.

== Occurrence in concrete ==
Afwillite is one of the calcium silicate hydrates (C-S-H) that form when Portland cement sets to form hardened cement paste (HCP) in concrete. The cement gets its strength from the hydration of tri- and di- calcium silicates (C_{3}S and C_{2}S) present in the clinker.

== See also ==
- List of minerals

Other calcium silicate hydrate (C-S-H) minerals:

- Gyrolite
- Jennite
- Thaumasite
- Tobermorite

Other calcium aluminium silicate hydrate (C-A-S-H) minerals:

- Tacharanite
