= Tobermorite =

Inosilicate alteration mineral in metamorphosed limestone and in skarn

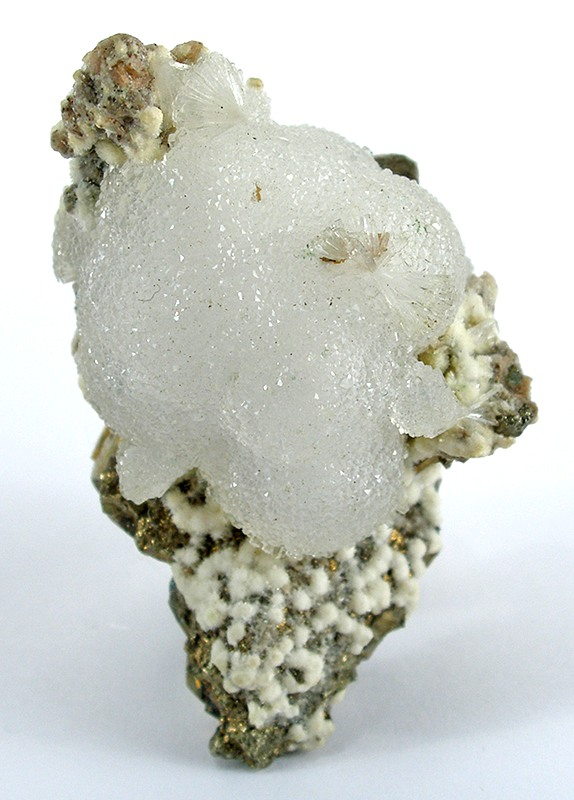
- Crystalline mass of tobermorite

General
- Category: Silicate mineral, Calcium silicate hydrate
- Formula: Ca_{5}Si_{6}O_{16}(OH)_{2}·4H_{2}O, or; Ca_{5}Si_{6}(O,OH)_{18}·5H_{2}O
- IMA symbol: Tbm
- Strunz classification: 9.DG.10
- Crystal system: Orthorhombic
- Crystal class: Disphenoidal (222); H-M symbol: (2 2 2)
- Space group: C222_{1} (no. 20)
- Unit cell: a = 11.17 Å, b = 7.38 Å c = 22.94 Å; β = 90°; Z = 4

Identification
- Formula mass: 702.36 g/mol
- Color: Pale pinkish white, white, brown
- Crystal habit: As minute laths; fibrous bundles, rosettes or sheaves, radiating or plumose, fine granular, massive.
- Cleavage: {001} Perfect, {100} Imperfect
- Mohs scale hardness: 2.5
- Luster: Vitreous, silky in fibrous aggregates
- Streak: White
- Diaphaneity: Translucent to translucent
- Specific gravity: 2.423 – 2.458
- Optical properties: Biaxial (+)
- Refractive index: nα = 1.570 nβ = 1.571 nγ = 1.575
- Birefringence: δ = 0.005
- Ultraviolet fluorescence: Fluorescent, Short UV:weak white to yellow, Long UV:weak white to yellow

Tobermorite is a calcium silicate hydrate mineral with chemical formula: Ca_{5}Si_{6}O_{16}(OH)_{2}·4H_{2}O or Ca_{5}Si_{6}(O,OH)_{18}·5H_{2}O.

Two structural varieties are distinguished: tobermorite-11 Å and tobermorite-14 Å. Tobermorite occurs in hydrated cement paste and can be found in nature as an alteration mineral in metamorphosed limestone and in skarn. It has been reported to occur in the Maqarin Area of north Jordan and in the Crestmore Quarry near Crestmore Heights, Riverside County, California.

Tobermorite was first described in 1880 for an occurrence in Scotland, on the Isle of Mull, around the locality of Tobermory.

== Use in Roman concrete ==
Aluminum-substituted tobermorite is understood to be a key ingredient responsible for the longevity of ancient undersea Roman concrete. The volcanic ash that Romans used for construction of sea walls contained phillipsite, and an interaction with sea water caused the crystalline structures in the concrete to expand and strengthen, making that material substantially more durable than modern concrete when exposed to sea water.

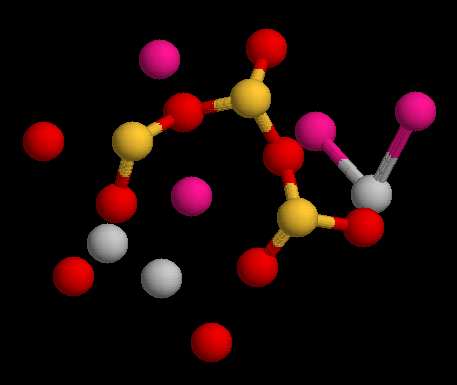
Crystal structure of tobermorite: elementary unit cell.

== Cement chemistry ==
Tobermorite is often used in thermodynamical calculations to represent the pole of the most evolved calcium silicate hydrate (C-S-H). According to its chemical formula, its atomic Ca/Si or molar CaO/SiO_{2} (C/S) ratio is 5/6 (0.83). Jennite represents the less evolved pole with a C/S ratio of 1.50 (9/6).

== See also ==
- Other calcium silicate hydrate (C-S-H) minerals:
  - Afwillite – Nesosilicate alteration mineral also sometimes found in hydrated cement paste
  - Gyrolite – Rare phyllosilicate mineral crystallizing in small spheres
  - Jaffeite – Sorosilicate mineral
  - Jennite – Inosilicate alteration mineral in metamorphosed limestone and in skarn
  - Okenite – Phyllosilicate mineral
  - Thaumasite – Complex calcium silicate hydrate mineral
  - Xonotlite – Inosilicate mineral
- Other calcium aluminium silicate hydrate, (C-A-S-H) minerals:
  - Hydrogarnet
  - Hydrogrossular
  - Hydrotalcite
  - Katoite
  - Tacharanite (Ca_{12}Al_{2}Si_{18}O_{33}(OH)_{36})
