= Xonotlite =

Calcium inosilicate mineral

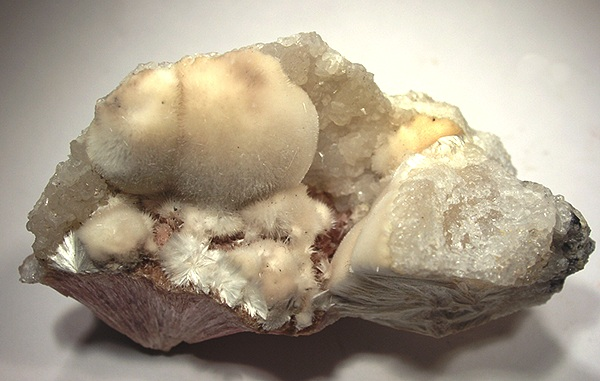
- Combination piece with radial fibrous inesite and xonotlite

General
- Category: Inosilicates
- Formula: Ca_{6}Si_{6}O_{17}(OH)_{2}
- IMA symbol: Xon
- Strunz classification: 9.DG.35
- Dana classification: 66.3.1.1
- Crystal system: Monoclinic
- Crystal class: Prismatic (2/m) (same H-M symbol)
- Space group: P2/a
- Unit cell: 879.33

Identification
- Color: White, grey, pale pink, lemon white, colorless
- Cleavage: Perfect, Good
- Fracture: Splintery, tough
- Mohs scale hardness: 6.5
- Luster: Vitreous, silky, pearly
- Streak: White
- Diaphaneity: Transparent, translucent
- Specific gravity: 2.70 – 2.72
- Density: Measured: 2.70 – 2.72; Calculated: 2.71
- Optical properties: Biaxial (+)
- Refractive index: n_{α} = 1.583 n_{β} = 1.585 n_{γ} = 1.595
- Birefringence: 0.012
- 2V angle: 50°
- Ultraviolet fluorescence: Short UV = weak gray-white Long UV = weak white
- Common impurities: Fe, Mn, H_{2}O

Xonotlite, or eakleite, is a mineral of general formula Ca_{6}Si_{6}O_{17}(OH)_{2} named by the German mineralogist Karl Friedrich August Rammelsberg in 1866. The name originates from its discovery locality, Tetela de Xonotla, Puebla, Mexico. Although it was discovered in 1866, it was first described by Taylor in 1959. It is approved by the IMA, but it is a grandfathered species, meaning the name represents a valid species til this day.

== Properties ==
Xonotlite is an inosilicate with double dreier chains, of which several polytypes are known. The known polytypes are Ma2bc, Ma2b2c and M2a2bc. It is a calcium silicate hydrate (CSH) mineral related to the tobermorite group. It can be colorless, gray, light gray, lemon white, or pink. It is transparent with a vitreous to silky luster. It leaves a white streak. Xonotlite is rated 6.5 on the Mohs scale of hardness. It crystallizes in the monoclinic – prismatic crystal system, with typically an acicular crystal form or habit, meaning it occurs as needle-like crystals. It is massive, meaning individual crystals are hard to tell apart as they form large masses. It mainly consists of oxygen (42.52%), calcium (33.63%) and silicon (23.57%), and includes hydrogen (0.28%), the four main elements present in calcium silicate hydrates. It is a luminescent mineral; under short ultraviolet light, it has a weak gray-white fluorescence, and under long UV, it is weak white. It is not a magnetic mineral and is not radioactive.

== Environment and mining ==
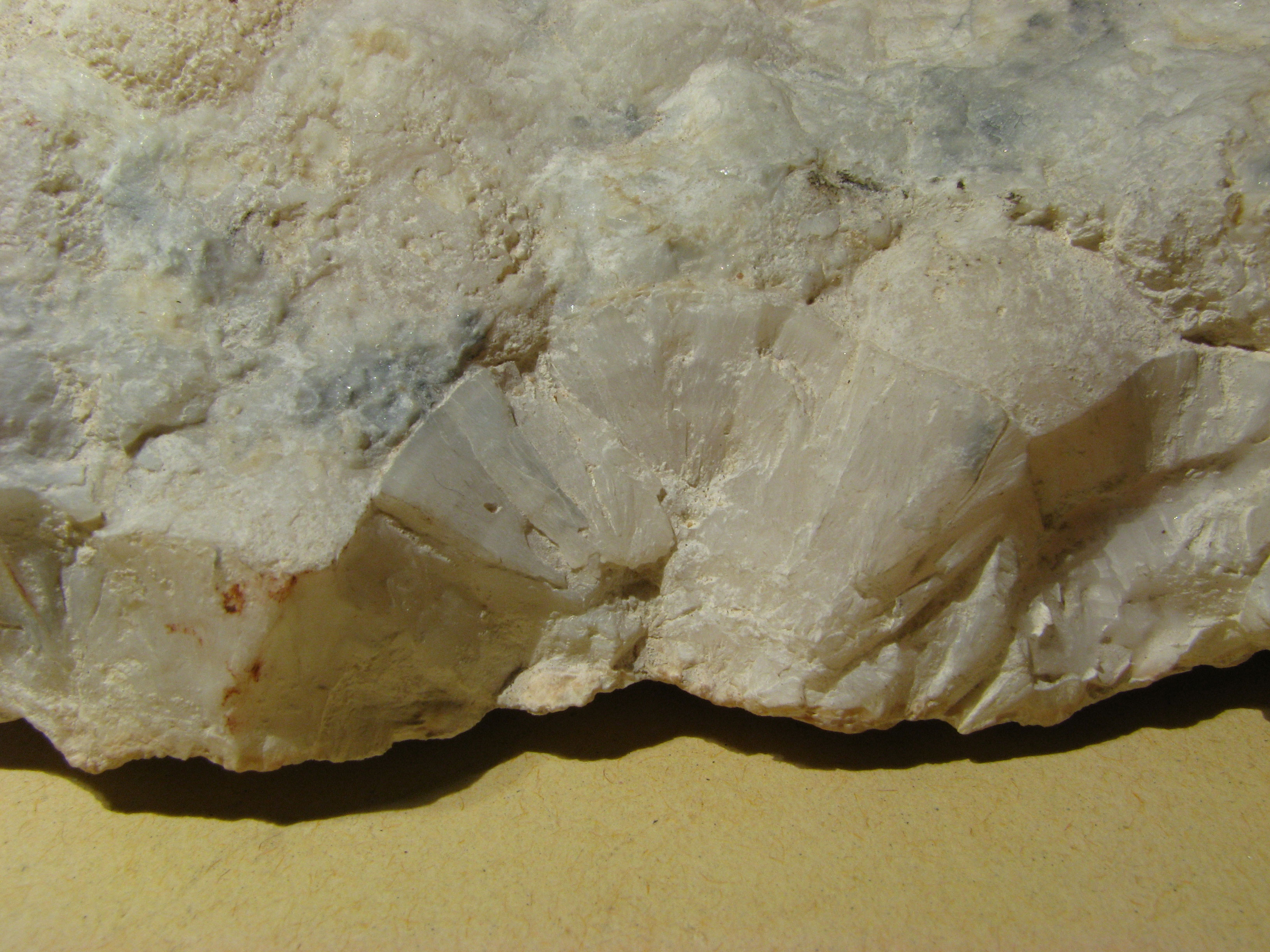
Xonotlite from Italy

Xonotlite occurs as veins in serpentinite and contact metamorphism aureoles. Associated minerals include apophyllite, diopside, stilbite, tobermorite, clinohedrite, thaumasite, laumontite and wollastonite.

The most common impurities include iron, magnesium and carbon dioxyde (CO_{2}) impurities. It has many type localities, the most notable one being Tetela de Ocampo, Mexico.

== See also ==
- Gyrolite – Rare phyllosilicate mineral crystallizing in small spheres
- Tacharanite – Calcium aluminium silicate hydrate mineral
- Tobermorite – Inosilicate alteration mineral in metamorphosed limestone and in skarn
