= Rhodium(III) sulfate =

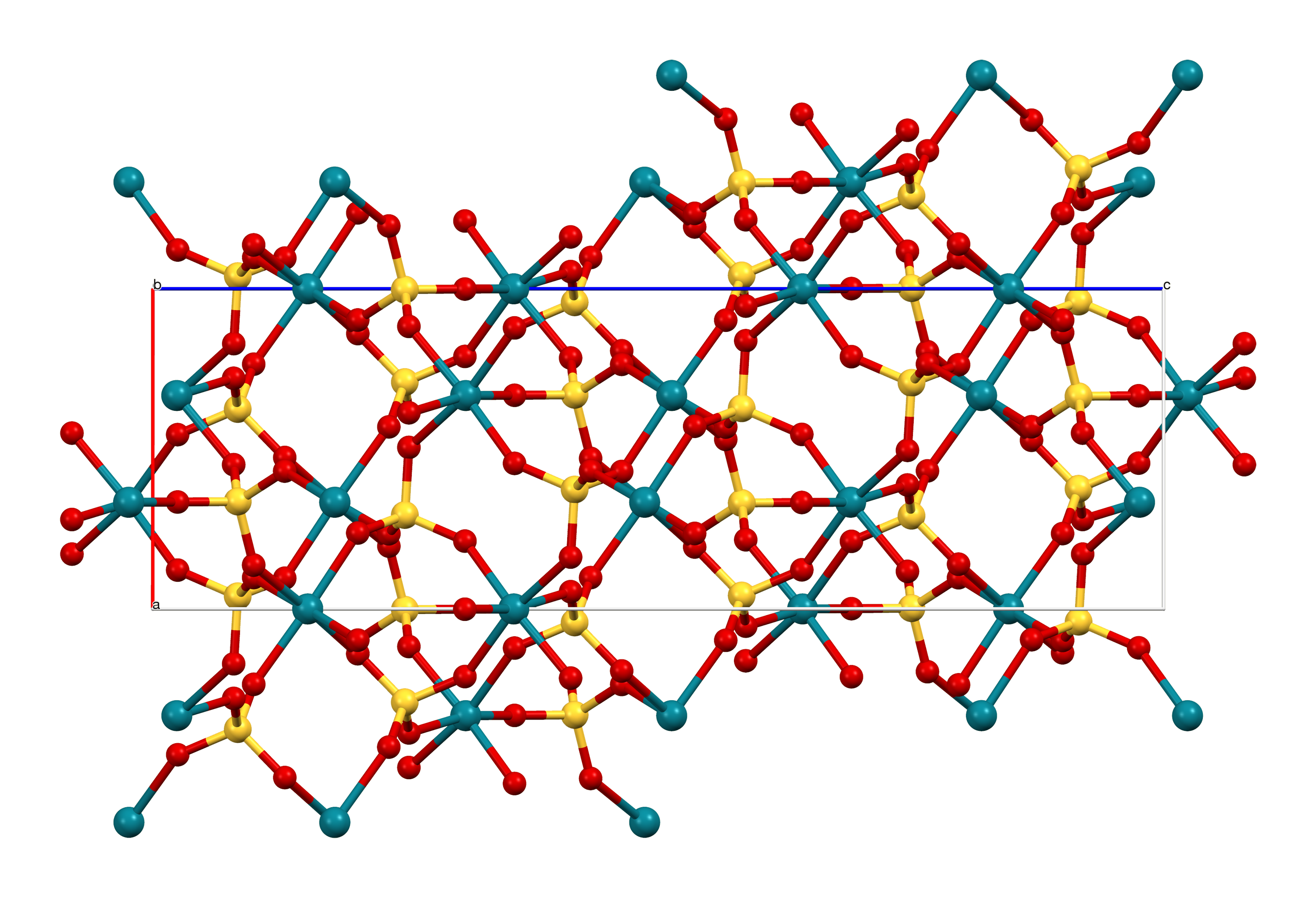

Identifiers
CAS Number	(tetrahydrate): 15274-78-9
3D model (JSmol)	(anhydrous): Interactive image; (monohydrate): Interactive image; (tetrahydrate): Interactive image
ChemSpider	140097
ECHA InfoCard	100.030.909
PubChem CID	(anhydrous): 159290; (monohydrate): 91886288; (tetrahydrate): 91886287
CompTox Dashboard (EPA)	DTXSID20890662
- InChI: (anhydrous): InChI=1S/3H2O4S.2Rh/c3*1-5(2,3)4;;/h3*(H2,1,2,3,4);;/q;;;2*+3/p-6 Key: YWFDDXXMOPZFFM-UHFFFAOYSA-H; (monohydrate): InChI=1S/3H2O4S.H2O.2Rh/c3*1-5(2,3)4;;;/h3*(H2,1,2,3,4);1H2;;/q;;;;2*+3/p-6 Key: MPJHDLITZOASKY-UHFFFAOYSA-H; (tetrahydrate): InChI=1S/3H2O4S.4H2O.2Rh/c3*1-5(2,3)4;;;;;;/h3*(H2,1,2,3,4);4*1H2;;/q;;;;;;;2*+3/p-6 Key: JJITWKYISWZJBI-UHFFFAOYSA-H
- SMILES: (anhydrous): [O-]S(=O)(=O)[O-].[O-]S(=O)(=O)[O-].[O-]S(=O)(=O)[O-].[Rh+3].[Rh+3]; (monohydrate): O.[O-]S(=O)(=O)[O-].[O-]S(=O)(=O)[O-].[O-]S(=O)(=O)[O-].[Rh+3].[Rh+3]; (tetrahydrate): O.O.O.O.[O-]S(=O)(=O)[O-].[O-]S(=O)(=O)[O-].[O-]S(=O)(=O)[O-].[Rh+3].[Rh+3]

Properties
Chemical formula	Rh_{2}(SO_{4})_{3}
Molar mass	493.98 g·mol^{−1}
Appearance	red solid

Structure
Crystal structure	trigonal
Space group	R3̅ (No. 148)
Lattice constant	a = 806.8 pm, c = 2204.8 pm
Lattice volume (V)	1242.8×10^{6} pm^{3}
Formula units (Z)	6 units per cell

Hazards
- GHS labelling
Pictograms	(GHS05: Corrosive) (GHS07: Exclamation mark) (GHS08: Health hazard) (GHS09: Environmental hazard)
Signal word	Danger
Hazard statements	H290, H314, H315, H319, H335, H341, H410
Precautionary statements	P203, P234, P260, P264, P264+P265, P271, P273, P280, P301+P330+P331, P302+P352, P302+P361+P354, P304+P340, P305+P351+P338, P305+P354+P338, P316, P317, P318, P319, P321, P332+P317, P337+P317, P362+P364, P363, P390, P391, P403+P233, P405, P501
Threshold limit value (TLV)	0.01 mg/m^{3} as Rh
- NIOSH (US health exposure limits)
PEL (Permissible)	0.001 mg/m^{3} as Rh
- Except where otherwise noted, data are given for materials in their standard state (at 25 °C [77 °F], 100 kPa). Infobox references

Rhodium(III) sulfate is an inorganic compound with the chemical formula Rh_{2}(SO_{4})_{3}. The anhydrous form is a red crystalline solid. Several hydrates and related compounds have been characterized.

== Structure and properties ==
The anhydrous compound (Rh_{2}(SO_{4})_{3}) forms red, plate-shaped trigonal crystals. The dihydrate (Rh_{2}(SO_{4})_{3}·2H_{2}O) forms orange orthorhombic crystals.

Compounds with the following formulas have been also studied: [Rh(H_{2}O)_{6}]_{2}(SO_{4})_{3}·4H_{2}O, (H_{3}O)[Rh(H_{2}O)_{6}](SO_{4})_{2}, [Rh(H_{2}O)_{5}OH](SO_{4})·0.5H_{2}O, and [Rh(H_{2}O)_{6}]_{2}(SO_{4})(H_{2}SO_{4})_{x}·5H_{2}O. The latter three were characterized by single-crystal X-ray diffraction and found to form monoclinic crystals. All phases are sparingly soluble in ethanol and well soluble in water.

== Preparation ==
Anhydrous rhodium(III) sulfate can be prepared by heating rhodium metal in concentrated sulfuric acid at 400 °C. It is reported that at a temperature of 475 °C the dihydrate is formed instead.

== History ==
The first attempt to produce rhodium(III) sulfate was in 1929 with the reaction of rhodium(III) hydroxide and sulfuric acid. Two hydrates were reported, a yellow crystalline pentadecahydrate and a red amorphous tetrahydrate. This was not confirmed due to a lack of structural proof.
