= Thaumasite =

Complex calcium silicate hydrate mineral

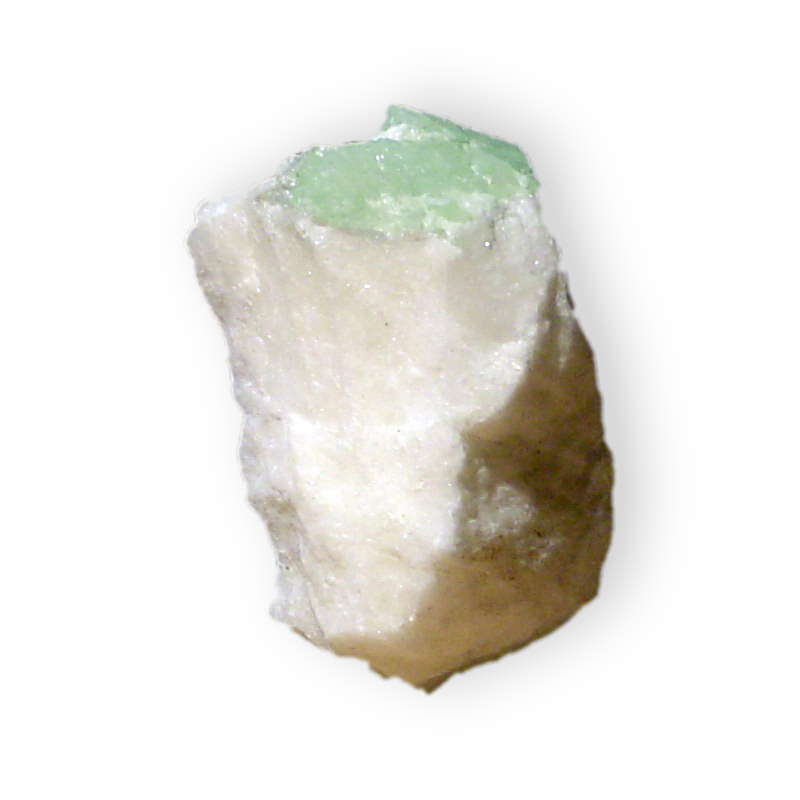
- Thaumasite (white) with prehnite (green) from Fairfax Quarry, Virginia

General
- Category: Sulfate minerals
- Formula: Ca_{3}Si(OH)_{6}(CO_{3})(SO_{4})·12H_{2}O CaSi(OH)_{6}·CaCO_{3}·CaSO_{4}·12H_{2}O CaSiO_{3}·CaCO_{3}·CaSO_{4}·15H_{2}O
- IMA symbol: Tma
- Strunz classification: 7.DG.15
- Crystal system: Hexagonal
- Crystal class: Pyramidal (6); H-M symbol: (6)
- Space group: P6_{3}
- Unit cell: a = 11.030(7), c = 10.396(6) [Å]; Z = 2

Identification
- Formula mass: 622.62 g/mol
- Color: Colorless, white, pale yellow
- Crystal habit: Prismatic, fibrous, massive, radial
- Cleavage: Indistinct
- Fracture: Subconchoidal
- Tenacity: Brittle
- Mohs scale hardness: 3.5
- Luster: Vitreous to silky
- Streak: White
- Diaphaneity: Transparent to translucent
- Specific gravity: 1.877
- Optical properties: Uniaxial (−)
- Refractive index: n_{ω} = 1.498–1.507 n_{ε} = 1.458–1.470
- Birefringence: δ = 0.039

Thaumasite is a calcium silicate mineral, containing Si atoms in unusual octahedral configuration, with chemical formula Ca_{3}Si(OH)_{6}(CO_{3})(SO_{4})·12H_{2}O, also sometimes more simply written as CaSiO_{3}·CaCO_{3}·CaSO_{4}·15H_{2}O.

It occurs as colorless to white prismatic hexagonal crystals, typically as acicular radiating groups. It also occurs as fibrous masses. Its Mohs hardness is 3.5 and it has a specific gravity of 1.88 to 1.90. Optically it is uniaxial negative with indices of refraction of nω = 1.507 and nε = 1.468.

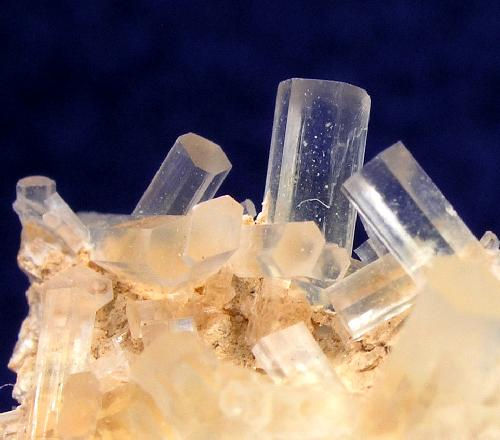
Group of thaumasite prisms from the Kuruman, Kalahari manganese fields, Northern Cape Province, South Africa (size: 4.2 × 3.1 × 1.2 cm)

It occurs as a hydrothermal alteration mineral in sulfide ore deposits and geothermal alteration of basalt and tuff. It occurs with zeolites, apophyllite, analcime, calcite, gypsum and pyrite.

Thaumasite can also be formed in man-made concrete structures at the detriment of calcium silicate hydrates (C-S-H, with dashes denoting the non-stoichiometry of this hydrated cement phase acting as the "glue" in hardened cement paste) during cement alteration, especially when sulfate attack develops. The reaction consuming the silicates of the "cement glue" can lead to harmful decohesion and softening (more rarely to expansion and cracking) of concrete. Unlike conventional sulfate attack, in which the calcium hydroxide (portlandite) and calcium aluminate hydrates react with sulfates to form gypsum and ettringite (an expansive phase) respectively, in the case of the thaumasite form of sulfate attack (TSA) the calcium silicate hydrates ensuring the cohesion in the hardened cement paste are also destroyed. As a consequence, even concrete containing sulfate-resisting Portland cement may be affected.

It was first described in 1878 in Sweden and named from the Greek, "thaumazein", to be surprised, in reference to its unusual composition with carbonate, sulfate and hydroxysilicate anions.

The silicate structure of thaumasite is unusual due to the presence of non-tetrahedral silicon in its crystal lattice. Indeed, an atypic octahedral configuration is observed for Si present in thaumasite in the form of hexahydroxysilicate: [Si(OH)_{6}]^{2−}, a species exhibiting a geometry similar to that of the hexafluorosilicate [SiF_{6}]^{2−}.

== See also ==
Other calcium silicate hydrate (C-S-H) minerals:

- Afwillite
- Hexafluorosilicic acid, a chemical species with a central hexacoordinated octahedral silicon atom
- Gyrolite
- Jennite
- Stishovite, a rare high-pressure mineral also with hexacoordinated octahedral silica
- Tobermorite
