= Rhodium(III) perchlorate =

Identifiers
3D model (JSmol)	anhydrous: Interactive image
PubChem CID	anhydrous: 21688474
CompTox Dashboard (EPA)	DTXSID301336623
- InChI: anhydrous: InChI=1S/3ClHO4.Rh/c3*2-1(3,4)5;/h3*(H,2,3,4,5);/q;;;+3/p-3 Key: LCAWZYUJRNVLIG-UHFFFAOYSA-K
- SMILES: anhydrous: [O-]Cl(=O)(=O)=O.[O-]Cl(=O)(=O)=O.[O-]Cl(=O)(=O)=O.[Rh+3]

Properties
Chemical formula	[Rh(H_{2}O)_{6}](ClO_{4})_{3}
Appearance	yellow solid
- Except where otherwise noted, data are given for materials in their standard state (at 25 °C [77 °F], 100 kPa). Infobox references

Rhodium(III) perchlorate refers to the inorganic compound with the formula [Rh(H_{2}O)_{6}](ClO_{4})_{3}. It is a hygroscopic yellow solid. It is the perchlorate salt of the tricationic aquo complex [Rh(H_{2}O)_{6}]^{3+}.

== Preparation ==
The compound is prepared by treating hydrated rhodium(III) chloride and perchloric acid at elevated temperatures:

[Rh(H_{2}O)_{6}]Cl_{3} + 3 HClO_{4} → [Rh(H_{2}O)_{6}](ClO_{4})_{3} + 3 HCl

The reaction of rhodium(III) hydroxide with concentrated perchloric acid also produces rhodium(III) perchlorate.

Rh(OH)_{3} + 3 HClO_{4} + 3 H_{2}O → [Rh(H_{2}O)_{6}](ClO_{4})_{3}
