= Okenite =

Phyllosilicate mineral

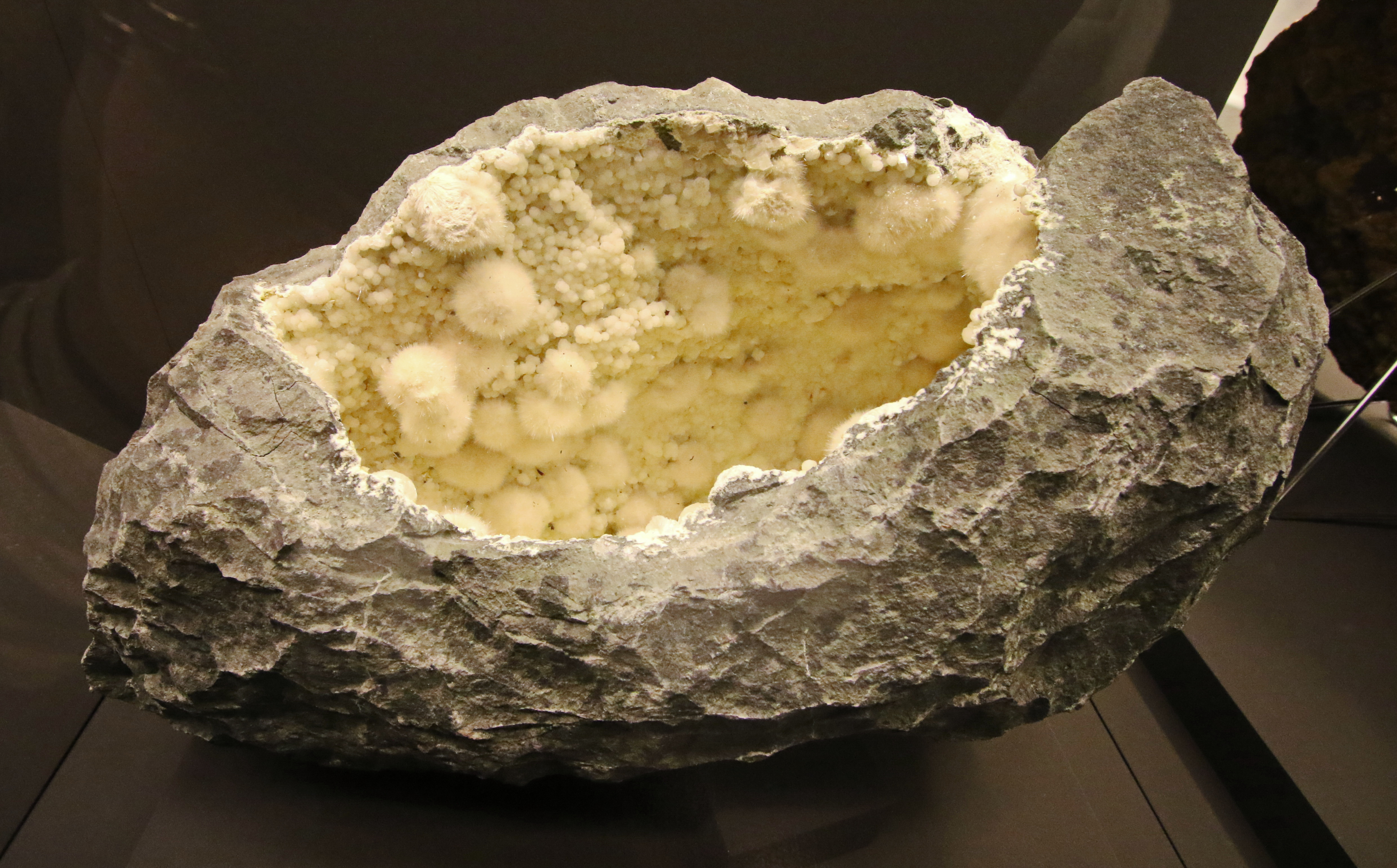

General
- Category: Phyllosilicate minerals
- Formula: CaSi_{2}O_{5}·2H_{2}O
- IMA symbol: Oke
- Strunz classification: 9.EA.40
- Crystal system: Triclinic
- Crystal class: Pinacoidal (1̅) (same H-M symbol)
- Space group: P1̅
- Unit cell: a = 9.69, b = 7.28 c = 22.02 [Å]; α = 92.7° β = 100.1°, γ = 110.9°; Z = 2

Identification
- Color: White, may show slightly yellow or blue tint
- Crystal habit: Bladed crystals, typically fibrous, clusters of curved crystals and radial balls
- Twinning: Lamellar
- Cleavage: Perfect on {001}
- Fracture: Splintery
- Tenacity: Elastic
- Mohs scale hardness: 4 1/2–5
- Luster: Vitreous, pearly
- Streak: White
- Diaphaneity: Transparent, translucent
- Specific gravity: 2.28–2.33
- Optical properties: Biaxial (−)
- Refractive index: n_{α} = 1.512 – 1.532 n_{β} = 1.514 – 1.535 n_{γ} = 1.515 – 1.542
- Birefringence: δ = 0.003 – 0.010
- 2V angle: Measured: 60°

Okenite (CaSi_{2}O_{5}·2H_{2}O) is a silicate mineral that is usually associated with zeolites. It most commonly is found as small white "cotton ball" formations within basalt geodes. These formations are clusters of straight, radiating, fibrous crystals that are both bendable and fragile. It also belongs to the family of the calcium silicate hydrates (C-S-H) commonly found in hardened cement paste. In cement chemist notation (CCN) it is noted as CaO·2SiO_{2}·2H_{2}O and abbreviated as CS_{2}H_{2}.

== Discovery and occurrence ==
It was first described in 1828 for an occurrence at Disko Island, Greenland and named for German naturalist Lorenz Oken (1779–1851).

Minerals associated with okenite include apophyllite, gyrolite, prehnite, chalcedony, goosecreekite and many of the mother zeolites. Okenite is found in India, mainly within the state of Maharashtra. Other localities include Bulla Island, Azerbaijan; Aranga, New Zealand; Chile; Ireland and Bordo Island in the Faroe Islands.

== See also ==
- List of minerals named after people
