= Roman concrete =

Building material used in ancient Rome

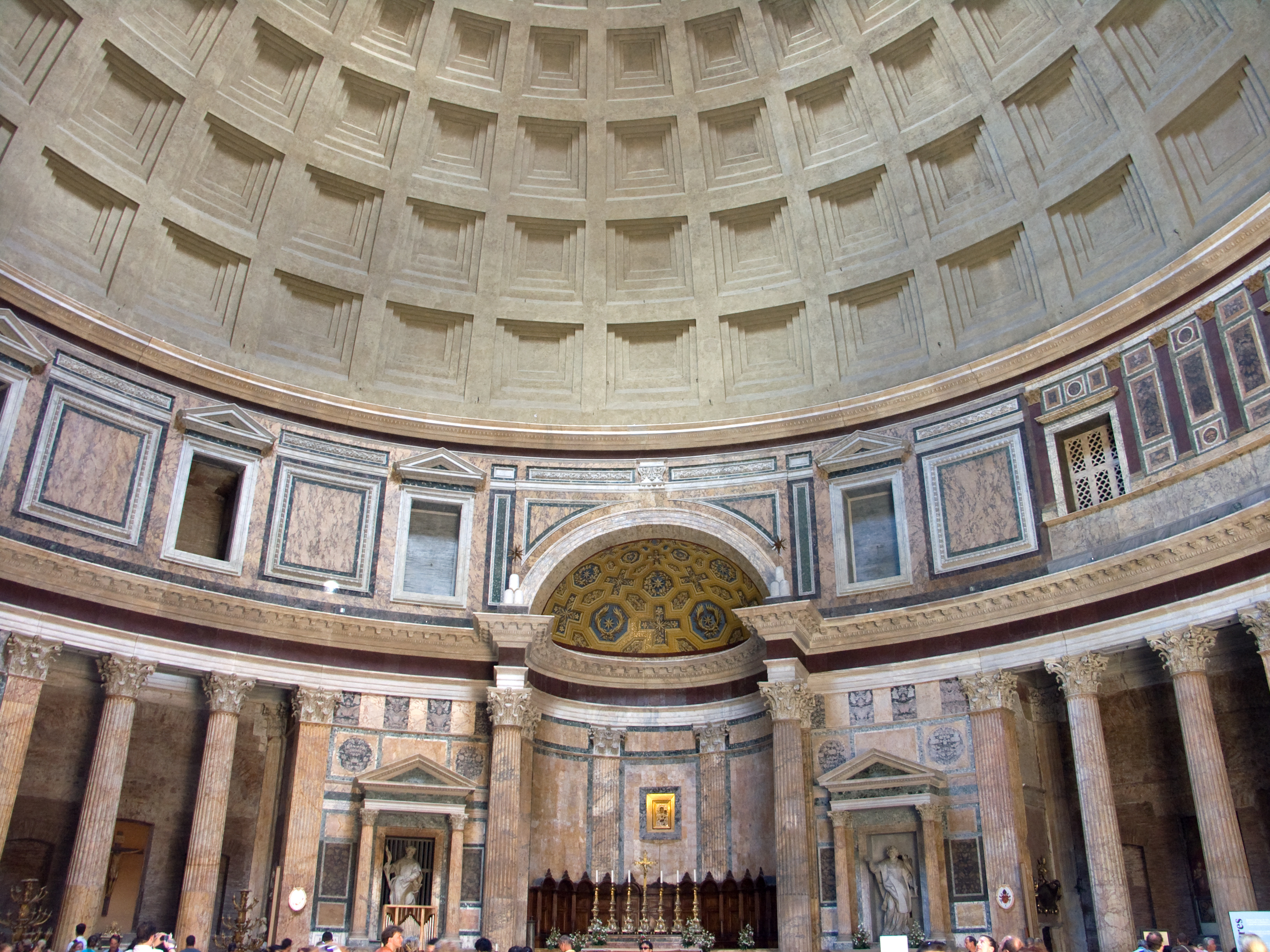
The Pantheon in Rome is an example of Roman concrete construction.

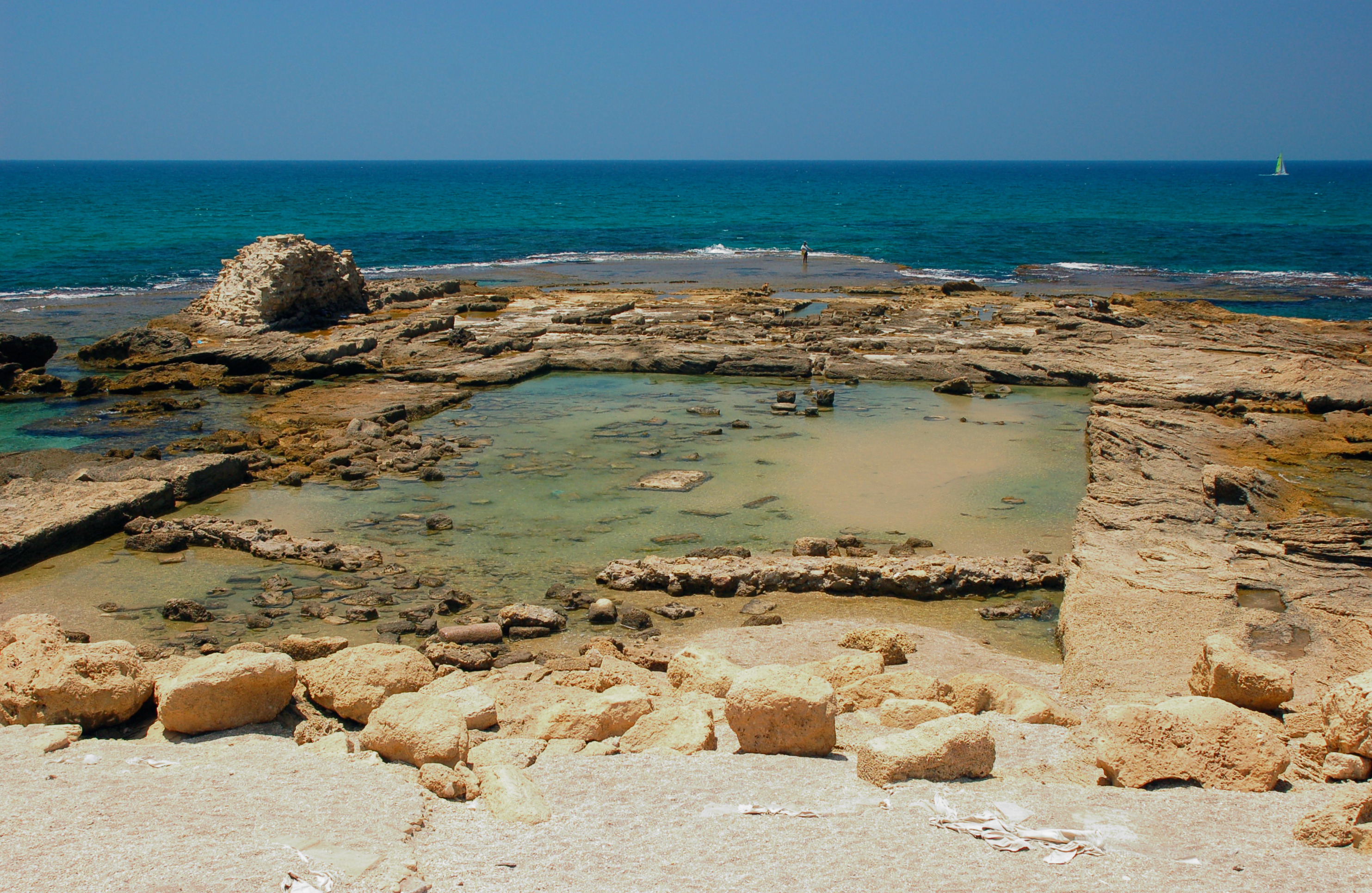
Caesarea harbour in Roman Judaea, an example of underwater Roman concrete technology on a large scale

Roman concrete, also called opus caementicium, was used in construction in ancient Rome. Like its modern equivalent, Roman concrete was based on a hydraulic-setting cement added to an aggregate.

Many buildings and structures still standing today, such as bridges, reservoirs and aqueducts, were built with this material, which attests to both its versatility and its durability. It was previously thought that its strength was enhanced by the incorporation of pozzolanic ash where available (particularly in the Bay of Naples). The addition of ash prevented cracks from spreading. However, research in 2023 has shown that the incorporation of mixtures of different types of lime, forming conglomerate "clasts" allowed the concrete to self-repair cracks, which was more likely the case.

Roman concrete was in widespread use from about 150 BC; some scholars believe it was developed a century before that.

It was often used in combination with facings and other supports, and interiors were further decorated by stucco, fresco paintings, or colored marble. Further innovative developments in the material, part of the so-called concrete revolution, contributed to structurally complicated forms. The most prominent example of these is the Pantheon dome, the world's largest and oldest unreinforced concrete dome.

Roman concrete differs from modern concrete in that the aggregates often included larger components; hence, it was laid rather than poured. Roman concretes, like any hydraulic concrete, were usually able to set underwater, which was useful for bridges and other waterside construction.

== History ==
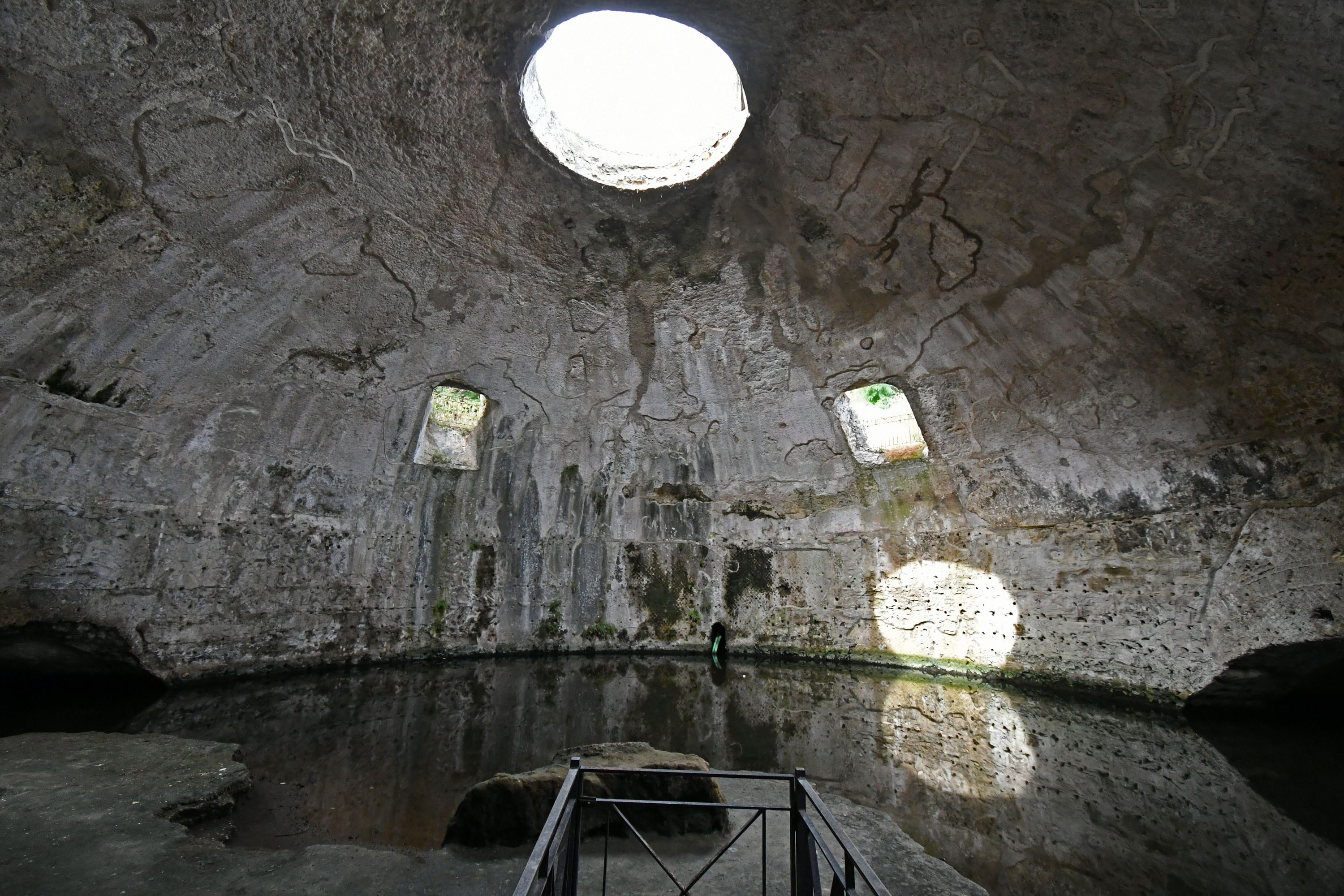
The "Temple of Mercury" in Baiae, a Roman frigidarium pool of a bathhouse built in the 1st century BC containing the oldest surviving concrete dome, and largest one before the Pantheon

Vitruvius, writing around 25 BC in his Ten Books on Architecture, distinguished types of materials appropriate for the preparation of lime mortars. For structural mortars, he recommended pozzolana (pulvis puteolanus in Latin), the volcanic sand from the beds of Pozzuoli, which are brownish-yellow-gray in colour in that area around Naples, and reddish-brown near Rome. Vitruvius specifies a ratio of 1 part lime to 3 parts pozzolana for mortar used in buildings and a 1:2 ratio for underwater work.

The Romans first used hydraulic concrete in coastal underwater structures, probably in the harbours around Baiae before the end of the 2nd century BC. The harbour of Caesarea is an example (22-15 BC) of the use of underwater Roman concrete technology on a large scale, for which enormous quantities of pozzolana were imported from Puteoli.

For rebuilding Rome after the fire in 64 AD which destroyed large portions of the city, Nero's new building code largely called for brick-faced concrete. This appears to have encouraged the development of the brick and concrete industries.

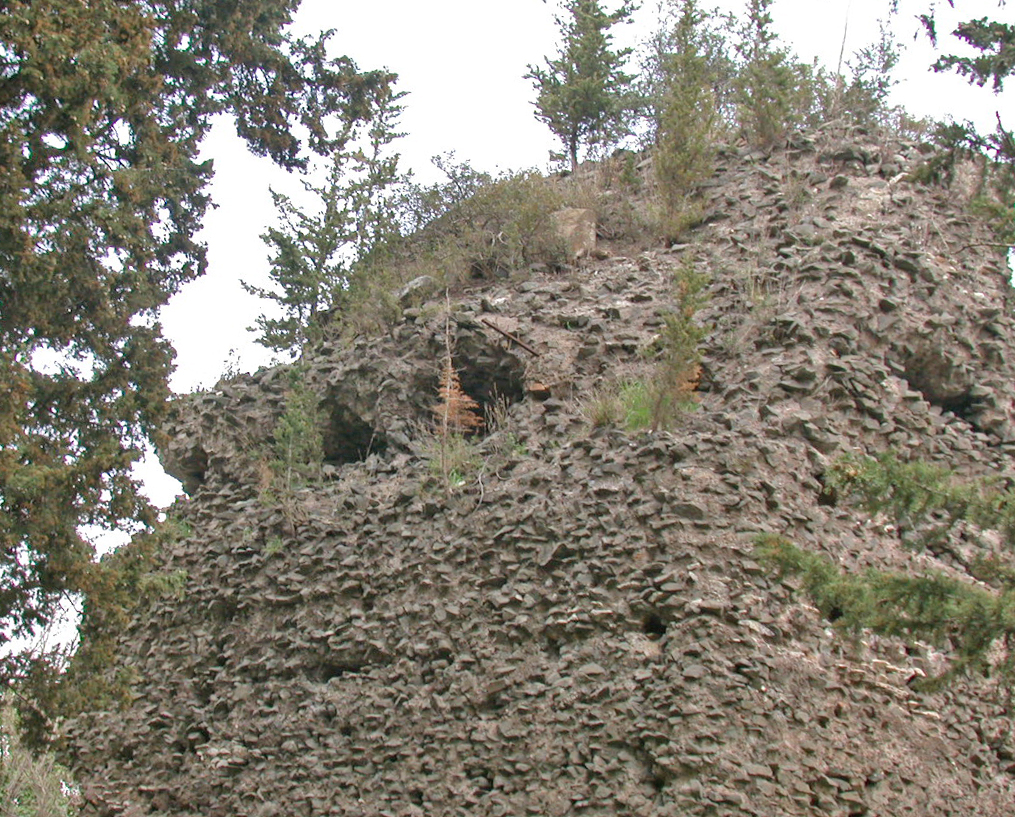
Example of opus caementicium on a tomb on the ancient Appian Way in Rome. The original covering has been removed.

A building site from 79 CE was uncovered at Pompeii in 2025, which contained unmixed Roman concrete building materials as well as the concreted structures.

== Material properties ==
Roman concrete, like any concrete, consists of an aggregate and hydraulic mortar, a binder mixed with water that hardens over time. The composition of the aggregate varied, and included pieces of rock, ceramic tile, lime clasts, and brick rubble from the remains of previously demolished buildings. In Rome, readily available tuff was often used as an aggregate.

Gypsum and quicklime were used as binders. Volcanic dusts, called pozzolana or "pit sand", were favoured where they could be obtained. Pozzolana makes the concrete more resistant to salt water than modern-day concrete. Pozzolanic mortar had a high content of alumina and silica.

Research in 2023 found that lime clasts, previously considered a sign of poor aggregation technique, react with water seeping into any cracks. This produces reactive calcium, which allows new calcium carbonate crystals to form and reseal the cracks. These lime clasts have a brittle structure that was most likely created in a "hot-mixing" technique with quicklime rather than traditional slaked lime, causing cracks to preferentially move through the lime clasts, thus potentially playing a critical role in the self-healing mechanism.

Concrete and, in particular, the hydraulic mortar responsible for its cohesion, was a type of structural ceramic whose utility derived largely from its rheological plasticity in the paste state. The setting and hardening of hydraulic cements derived from hydration of materials and the subsequent chemical and physical interaction of these hydration products. This differed from the setting of slaked lime mortars, the most common cements of the pre-Roman world. Once set, Roman concrete exhibited little plasticity, although it retained some resistance to tensile stresses.

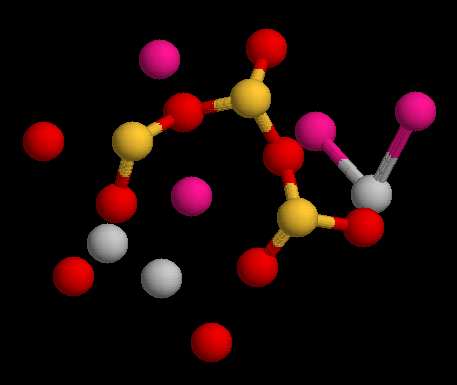
Crystal structure of tobermorite: elementary unit cell

The setting of pozzolanic cements has much in common with setting of their modern counterpart, Portland cement. The high silica composition of Roman pozzolana cements is very close to that of modern cement to which blast furnace slag, fly ash, or silica fume have been added.

The strength and longevity of Roman 'marine' concrete is understood to benefit from a reaction of seawater with a mixture of volcanic ash and quicklime to create a rare crystal called tobermorite, which may resist fracturing. As seawater percolated within the tiny cracks in the Roman concrete, it reacted with phillipsite naturally found in the volcanic rock and created aluminous tobermorite crystals. The result is a candidate for "the most durable building material in human history". In contrast, modern concrete exposed to saltwater deteriorates within decades.

The Roman concrete at the Tomb of Caecilia Metella is another variation higher in potassium that triggered changes that "reinforce interfacial zones and potentially contribute to improved mechanical performance".

== Seismic technology ==
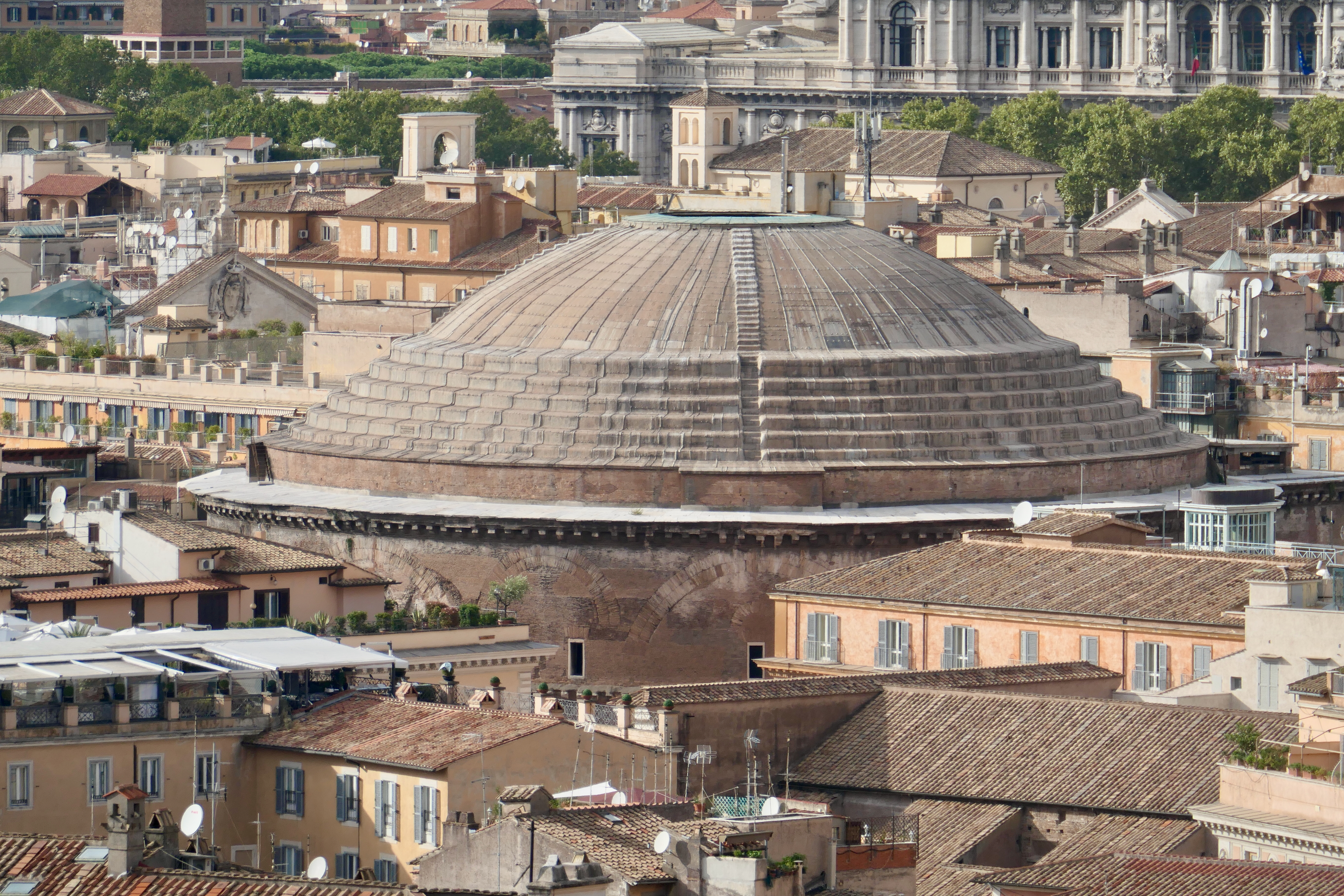
Exterior view of the Pantheon's concrete dome

For an environment as prone to earthquakes as the Italian Peninsula, interruptions and internal constructions within walls and domes created discontinuities in the concrete mass. Portions of the building could then shift slightly when there was movement of the earth to accommodate such stresses, enhancing the overall strength of the structure. It was in this sense that bricks and concrete were flexible. It may have been precisely for this reason that, although many buildings sustained serious cracking from a variety of causes, they continue to stand to this day.

Another technology used to improve the strength and stability of concrete was its gradation in domes. One example is the Pantheon, where the aggregate of the upper dome region consists of alternating layers of light tuff and pumice, giving the concrete a density of 1,350 kilograms per cubic metre (84 lb/cu ft). The foundation of the structure used travertine as an aggregate, having a much higher density of 2,200 kilograms per cubic metre (140 lb/cu ft).

== Modern use ==
Scientific studies of Roman concrete since 2010 have attracted both media and industry attention. Because of its unusual durability, longevity, and lessened environmental footprint, corporations and municipalities are starting to explore the use of Roman-style concrete in North America. This involves replacing the volcanic ash with coal fly ash that has similar properties. Proponents say that concrete made with fly ash can cost up to 60% less, because it requires less cement. It also has a reduced environmental footprint, due to its lower cooking temperature and much longer lifespan. Usable examples of Roman concrete exposed to harsh marine environments have been found to be 2000 years old with little or no wear. In 2013, the University of California Berkeley published an article that described for the first time the mechanism by which the suprastable calcium-aluminium-silicate-hydrate compound binds the material together. During its production, less carbon dioxide is released into the atmosphere than any modern concrete production process. It is no coincidence that the walls of Roman buildings are thicker than those of modern buildings. However, Roman concrete was still gaining its strength for several decades after construction had been completed.

== See also ==
- Energetically modified cement (EMC) – Class of cements, mechanically processed to transform reactivity
- Geopolymer – Polymeric Si–O–Al framework similar to zeolites but amorphous
- Pozzolanic activity – Measure of chemical reaction in cement
- Roman brick – Style of brick used in Ancient Roman architecture
- Roman cement – Cement made by burning septaria, unrelated to ancient Rome
- Roman masonry – Building techniques in Ancient Rome
- Tobermorite – Inosilicate alteration mineral in metamorphosed limestone and in skarn
