= Fluorapophyllite-(K) =

Phyllosilicate mineral in the apophyllite group

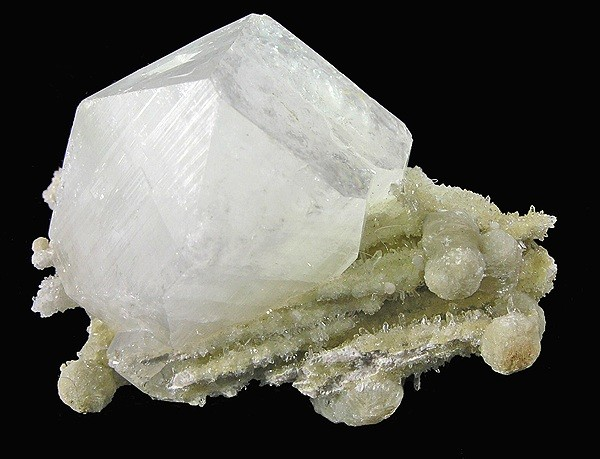

General
- Category: Phyllosilicate minerals
- Group: Apophyllite group
- Formula: KCa_{4}Si_{8}O_{20}(F,OH)·8(H_{2}O)
- IMA symbol: Fapo-K
- Strunz classification: 9.EA.15
- Crystal system: Tetragonal
- Crystal class: Ditetragonal dipyramidal (4/mmm); H–M symbol: (4/m 2/m 2/m)
- Space group: P4/mnc
- Unit cell: a = 8.963(2), c = 15.804(2) [Å]; Z = 2

Identification
- Color: Colorless, white, pink, pale, yellow, green; in thin section, colorless
- Crystal habit: Tabular to prismatic crystals; may be pseudocubic
- Twinning: Rare on {111}
- Cleavage: Perfect on {001}, imperfect on {110}
- Fracture: Uneven
- Tenacity: Brittle
- Mohs scale hardness: 4.5–5
- Luster: Vitreous, pearly on {001}
- Diaphaneity: Transparent to translucent
- Specific gravity: 2.33–2.37
- Optical properties: Uniaxial (+)
- Refractive index: n_{ω} = 1.530 – 1.536 n_{ε} = 1.532 – 1.538
- Birefringence: δ = 0.002
- Dispersion: High, may be anomalous

Fluorapophyllite-(K), formerly known as apophyllite-(KF) and sometimes simply referred to as fluorapophyllite, is the most common mineral of the apophyllite group, with the chemical formula of KCa_{4}Si_{8}O_{20}(F,OH)·8(H_{2}O). It gets the first part of its name, "fluor", because it contains more fluorine than hydroxide compared to the other minerals in the apophyllite group.

Fluorapophyllite crystallizes in the tetragonal crystal system. Tetragonal minerals have three axes of different lengths and angles of 90 degrees. Fluorapophyllite is an anisotropic mineral and has low relief. This mineral belongs to the uniaxial (+) optical class, which means its indicatrix has a prolate sphenoid shape with a circular section, principal section, and one optic axis.

Fluorapophyllite is popular among many mineral collectors because of the large, well-developed crystals they form and the multiple colors they come in. The most wanted variation of fluorapophyllite is the green colored variant, which is found in India. Fluorapophyllite is also found in New Jersey of the United States. This mineral is found as a secondary mineral in vesicles in volcanic rocks such as basalt.

== Images ==
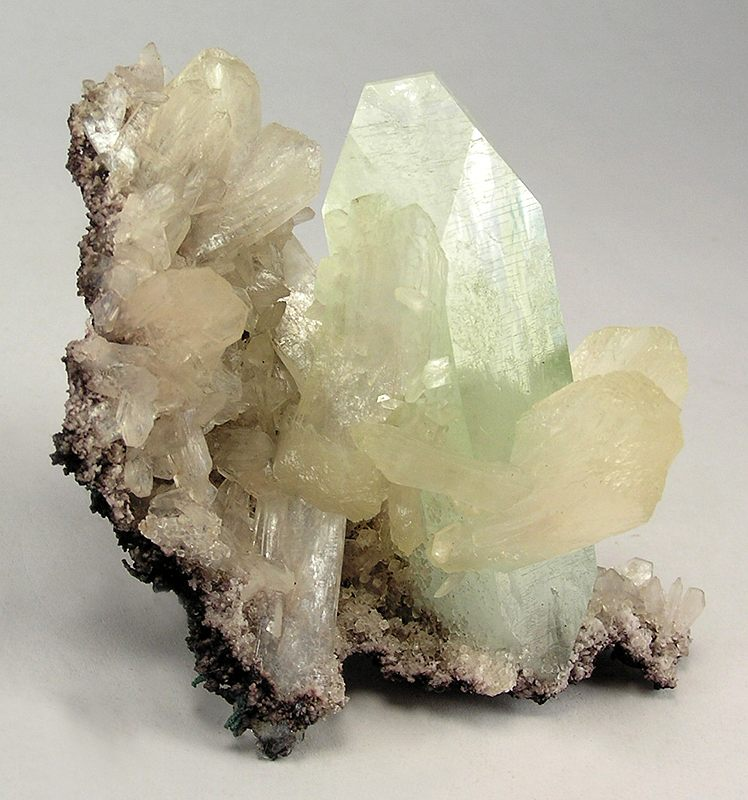
Stilbite crystals surround a pastel green, translucent fluorapophyllite crystal

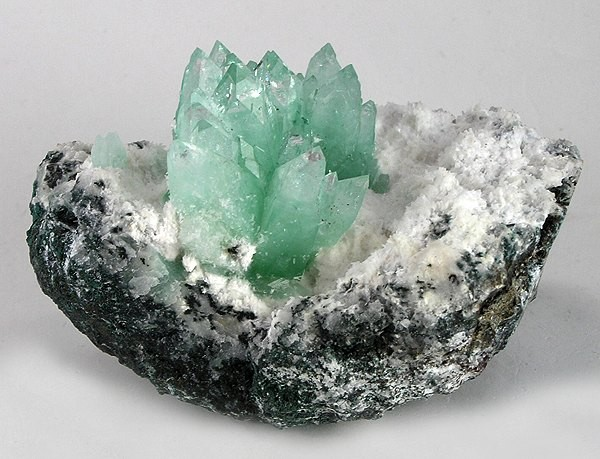
Isolated apophyllite cluster on contrasting matrix

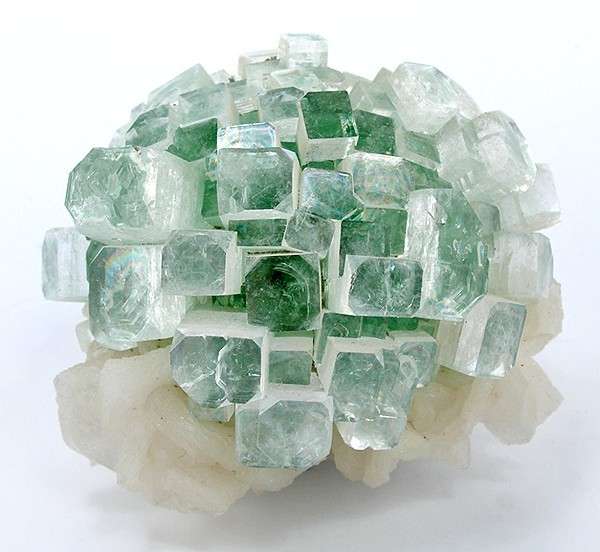
A radial cluster of cubically-tipped apophyllite crystals

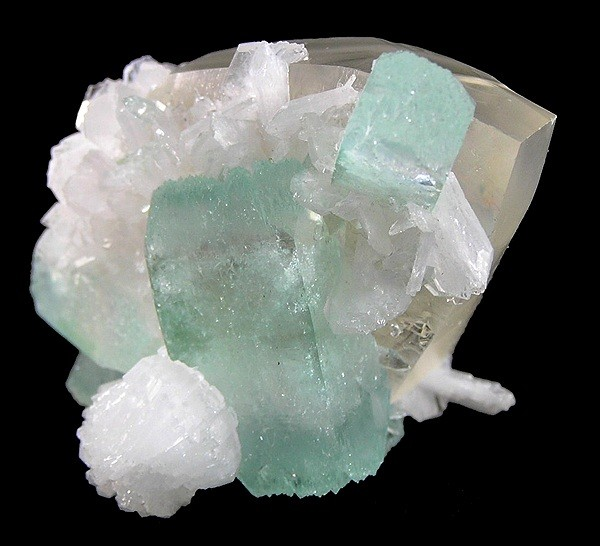
Light green form from Pune District, Maharashtra, India
