= Tacharanite =

Calcium aluminium silicate hydrate mineral

Tachanarite
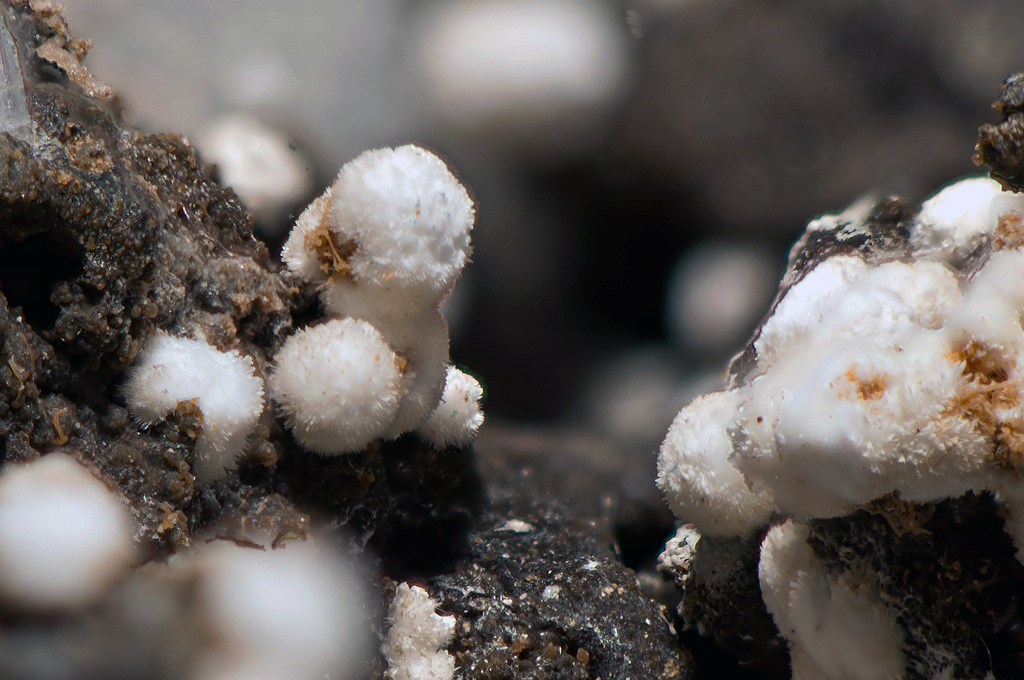
- Globular, white tacharanite (diameter 2.5 mm) from Palagonia, Italy

General
- Category: Minerals
- Formula: Ca_{12}Al_{2}Si_{18}O_{33}(OH)_{36}
- IMA symbol: Tch
- Strunz classification: 9.HA.75
- Dana classification: 72.3.2.6
- Crystal system: Monoclinic
- Space group: A-centered
- Unit cell: a = 17.07 Å, b = 3.65 Å, c = 27.9 Å β = 114.1° Z = 1 V = 1,586.80 Å^{3}

Identification
- Formula mass: 2,180.68 g/mol
- Color: Milky white
- Crystal habit: Cryptocrystalline
- Cleavage: Perfect {001}
- Fracture: Conchoidal
- Tenacity: Tough
- Mohs scale hardness: 5
- Luster: Vitreous, earthy, dull
- Streak: White
- Diaphaneity: Translucent
- Specific gravity: 2.33 – 2.36
- Density: 2.33 – 2.36 g/cm^{3} Calculated: 2.28 g/cm^{3}
- Optical properties: Biaxial
- Refractive index: n_{α} = 1.518 – 1.525 n_{γ} = 1.530 – 1.537
- Birefringence: 0.0120
- Dispersion: Relatively strong
- Fusibility: Decompose
- Common impurities: Fe, Mg, Na, K
- Other characteristics: Non radioactive

Tacharanite is a calcium aluminium silicate hydrate (C-A-S-H) mineral of general chemical formula Ca_{12}Al_{2}Si_{18}O_{33}(OH)_{36} with some resemblance to the calcium silicate hydrate (C-S-H) mineral tobermorite. It is often found in mineral assemblage with zeolites and other hydrated calcium silicates.

C-S-H and C-A-S-H mineral phases are important hydration products of cements but can also be found, although much less frequently, in natural conditions in particular geological environments. The natural specimens are rare and of small size (often available only in limited quantity) but often well crystallised while the hydrated cement phases are disordered and cryptocrystalline or amorphous with a poorly defined stoichiometry denoted by the use of dashes in the abbreviations C-S-H and C-A-S-H.

== Etymology ==
Tachanarite (pronunciation as tă·kherenait: /tɑːkɑːrɑːnaɪt/) was named by Sweet et al. (1961) from the Gaelic word "tacharan", a changeling, "an object or a thing left in place of a thing stolen" alluding to the initially presumed instability of this mineral because after the first X-rays photographic examination it was thought to be unstable when exposed to air and prone to decompose into tobermorite and gyrolite. The name tachanarite was inspired both by the nature of the supposed mineral behaviour and the wealth of folklore associated with the Isle of Skye where it was found.

== Stability of the crystal structure ==
According to Sweet et al. (1961) and Cliff et al. (1975), tacharanite shows some close resemblances to tobermorite, a calcium silicate hydrate (C-S-H) mineral but also significantly differs from it because it contains aluminium in its crystal lattice, making it a member of the calcium aluminium silicate hydrates (C-A-S-H) family. Tacharanite has a monoclinic crystal structure.

Cliff et al. (1975) have also studied the stability of tacharanite standing in air but could not evidence any change. The results of their study thus contradict these of the very first work of Sweet et al. (1961) reporting the change of tacharanite into a mixture of tobermorite and gyrolite which was the main source of inspiration for the mineral name.

A possible explanation for this discrepancy could reside in the impure nature and the quite limited quantity of the mineral samples that Sweet et al. (1961) have studied: they only worked onto a few milligrams (29 mg) of a complex mixture of several minerals very difficult to separate (amongst others, tacharanite, tobermorite and gyrolite...) and nested in the vesicles of the olivine-dolerite intrusive rock.

In 2007, on the basis of a larger number of tacharanite samples, a team of mineralogists from the Russian Academy of Sciences at Moscow (Organova et al., 2007) have comprehensively revisited the crystal structure of this poorly studied mineral. From the tobermorite structure, they derived a model of the tacharanite structure and also established a relationship with a possible zeolite-like structure. Based on these information, they proposed a tentative mechanism of formation considering the overall close presence of zeolite in the systems where tacharanite is found.

== Chemical composition ==
The general chemical composition of tacharanite is most often reported as Ca_{12}Al_{2}Si_{18}O_{33}(OH)_{36}. Cliff et al. (1975) mention an equivalent composition of Ca_{12}Al_{2}Si_{18}O_{69}H_{36}, simply written without expliciting the OH groups.

However, the tacharanite composition is sometimes referred as Ca_{12}Al_{2}Si_{18}O_{51} · 18H_{2}O, or as Ca_{12}Al_{2}[Si_{6}O_{17}]_{3} · 18H_{2}O, an equivalent notation more explicit for the silicate structure.

Finally, an enigmatic, and less hydrated composition, of Ca_{12}Al_{2}Si_{18}O_{15}(OH)_{2} · 3H_{2}O is mentioned in the case of a synthesis report on the Maqarin natural analogue.

There is no uncertainties on the content in calcium, aluminium and silicon whose relative ratios are always the same: Ca_{12}Al_{2}Si_{18}. However, the number of oxygen atoms or OH groups present in the hydrate chemical formula can vary, depending on the literature source, and is thus more uncertain, perhaps legitimating the tacharan roots of the name. This aspect needs to be verified before performing geochemical modeling calculations.

== Natural occurrences ==
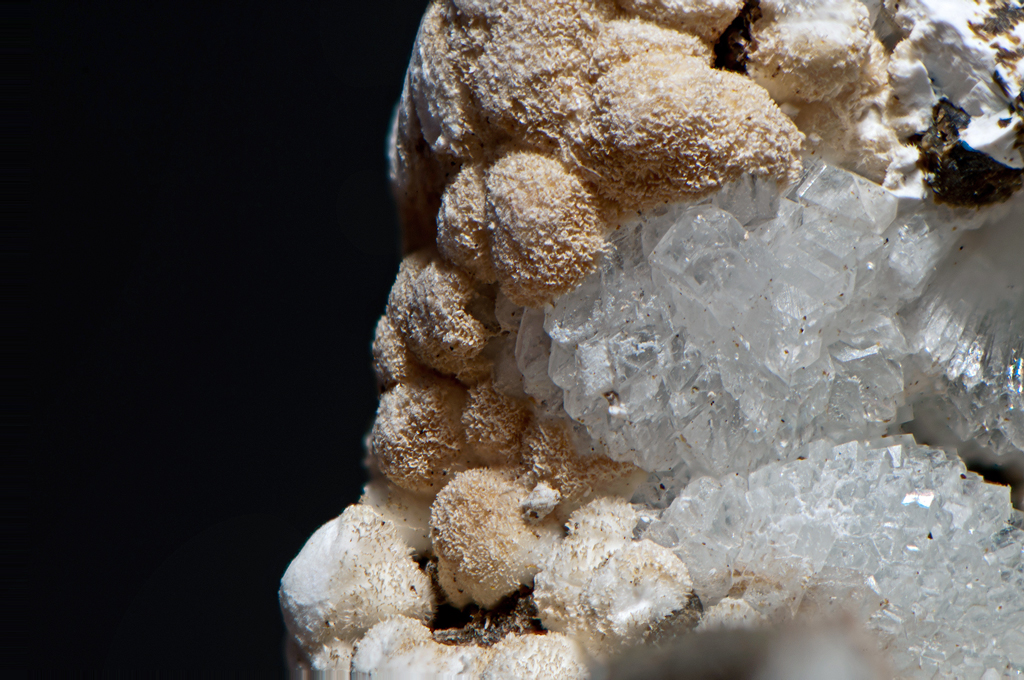
Spherical, cream-coloured tacharanite on white Na-phillipsite (a mineral series of the zeolite group) from Palagonia, northern Iblean plateau, Sicily, Italy (field of view 1 cm).

Tacharanite was first identified by Sweet et al. (1961) in vesicles of an intrusive igneous rock injected into a vein in the parent rock) at a small outcrop at Portree, Trotternish, Isle of Skye, Inner Hebrides islands, Highland of Scotland, UK. Tacharanite is associated there with other hydrated calcium silicates (tobermorite, gyrolite and xonotlite) and zeolites (aluminosilicates: laumontite, mesolite, thomsonite, and analcime) also found in neighbouring localities. It was first presumed by Sweet et al. (1961) to be a new member of the tobermorite group.

In 1961, tacharanite was also identified in Tasmania (Australia) by Sutherland who made a second parallel discovery of the mineral quasi at the same time as Sweet et al. (1961), but published his results later.

Tacharanite natural occurrence has also been considered in the frame of the characterization works and geochemical modelling of the natural analogue sites of Khushaym Matruk and Maqarin in central and northern Jordan where natural alkaline plumes are driven in the rock formation by the diffusion of very basic fluids with a high pH.

Tacharanite is also present in the clastic dikes of the Hatrurim basin (western flank of the Dead Sea) studied as natural analogues of alkaline concrete.

Natural analogue studies inspired by the first works on natural calcium silicate hydrates, closely related to the chemistry of cement, are performed to better understand the behaviour of an alkaline perturbation developing around the galleries of a cementitious radioactive waste repository.

== Cement hydration products ==
C-S-H (the "cement glue") and C-A-S-H phases are essential phases of the hardened cement paste (HCP) contributing to the development of the concrete strength. They are formed by the hydration of the cement clinker and ground granulated blast-furnace slags (GGBFS). Harry F. W. Taylor, eminent cement chemist at the University of Aberdeen (Scotland, UK), was a pioneer and an indefatigable artisan in their detailed characterisation. This explains the interest of Taylor, Cliff, and their colleagues for reappraising in 1975 the crystal structure and the stability of tachanarite, a decade after the two parallel discoveries in 1961 of the mineral by Sweet et al. at Portree (Isle of Skye, Scotland) and Sutherland in Tasmania.

== Cement–clay interactions ==
Tacharanite has received additional attention in the context of natural analogue studies undertaken to investigate the possible effects of an alkaline plume developing around a high-level radioactive waste repository.

In the frame of the geological disposal of high-level radioactive waste and spent fuel, large amounts of concrete will be used in the near-field of a deep geologic repository. Cementitious materials will serve as waste immobilization matrix, buffer materials, backfill materials, and also for the lining of galleries (shotcrete and concrete blocks). The high pH prevailing in concrete pore water is beneficial for immobilizing radionuclides (low solubility, high sorption and limitation of the microbial activity). Since the mid-1980, many studies were initiated after the pioneering works of Atkinson et al. (1985, 1988, 1990) at UKAEA (Harwell) to assess the time dependence of pH in a radioactive waste repository. Simultaneously, also emerged the question of the geochemical perturbation induced by an alkaline plume developing in an argillaceous environment. Indeed, the integrity of the repository near field could be compromised as large quantities of concrete will be placed in direct contact with the host rock (clay sedimentary formation or granite). The pore water of the hardened cement paste (HCP) of concrete is hyperalkaline with a high pH. When Portland cement is used, young cement water (YCW) rich in potassium hydroxide (KOH) and sodium hydroxide (NaOH) has initially a very high pH of ~ 13.5. Latter in the cement degradation stages, evolved cement water (ECW) has a pH of 12.5 controlled by the dissolution of portlandite (Ca(OH)_{2}). The hydroxide anions (OH^{−}) released by the concrete in contact with clay pore water, or granite groundwater, slowly diffuse into the host geological formation where they interact with the various mineral phases of the surrounding rock. Inside a backfilled gallery, and in the seals of drifts and shafts the same process will also affect the clay minerals of the bentonite buffer material. Water-rock interactions lead to complex dissolution and precipitation reactions at the interface between cement and clay materials. The main reaction products of an alkaline plume in clay are calcium silicate hydrates (C-S-H) and zeolites potentially contributing to clogging the porosity at the cement-clay interface.

As tacharanite is a member of the family of the calcium aluminium silicate hydrates (C-A-S-H), it has also been identified as a potentially newly formed minerals in the frame of the cement–clay interactions and taken into account for the geochemical modelling studies.

== See also ==
- C-S-H (calcium silicate hydrate) – Main product of the hydration of Portland cement
- Gyrolite – Rare phyllosilicate mineral crystallizing in small spheres
- Tobermorite – Inosilicate alteration mineral in metamorphosed limestone and in skarn
- Xonotlite – Inosilicate mineral
- List of minerals
