= Rhodium(III) hydroxide =

Identifiers
| CAS Number | 21656-02-0 |
| 3D model (JSmol) | Interactive image |
| ChemSpider | 62910110 |
| ECHA InfoCard | 100.040.447 |
| EC Number | 244-508-2 |
| PubChem CID | 88993 |
| UNII | 8K9U9UK29T |
| CompTox Dashboard (EPA) | DTXSID80944256 |
- InChI: InChI=1S/3H2O.Rh/h3*1H2;/q;;;+3/p-3 Key: KTEDZFORYFITAF-UHFFFAOYSA-K
- SMILES: [OH-].[OH-].[OH-].[Rh+3]

Properties
| Chemical formula | H_{3}O_{3}Rh |
| Molar mass | 153.926 g·mol^{−1} |

Hazards
- GHS labelling
| Pictograms | (GHS07: Exclamation mark) |
| Signal word | Warning |
| Hazard statements | H302, H312, H315, H319, H332, H335, H413 |
| Precautionary statements | P261, P264, P270, P271, P273, P280, P301+P312, P302+P352, P304+P312, P304+P340, P305+P351+P338, P312, P321, P322, P330, P332+P313, P337+P313, P362, P363, P403+P233, P405, P501 |
- Except where otherwise noted, data are given for materials in their standard state (at 25 °C [77 °F], 100 kPa). Infobox references

Rhodium(III) hydroxide is a chemical compound with the formula Rh(OH)_{3}.

Various compounds of rhodium(III) with hydroxide ligands are known.

Some double hydroxides called rhodium(III) hydrogarnets are known to exist. They include BaNaRh(OH)_{6}, Ca_{3}Rh_{2}(OH)_{12}, Sr_{3}Rh_{2}(OH)_{12}. and Ba_{3}[Rh(OH)_{6}]_{2} ⋅ H_{2}O.

Ga[Rh(OH)_{6}(Mo_{6}O_{18})](H_{2}O)_{16} is a complex molybdate hydroxide.
