= Ground granulated blast-furnace slag =

By-product of iron and steel-making

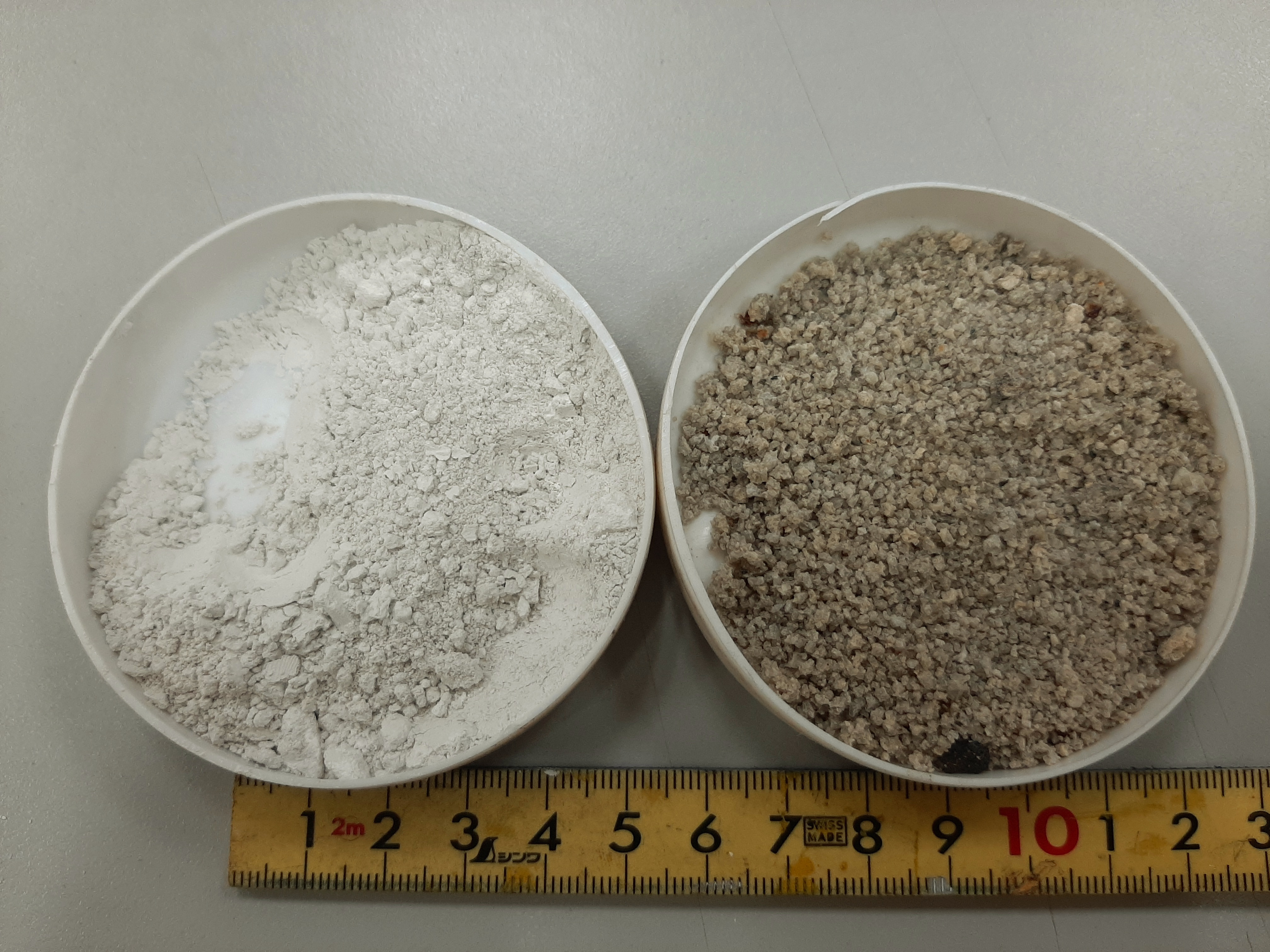
Samples of "ground granulated blast furnace slag" (left) and "granulated blast furnace slag" (right)

Ground granulated blast-furnace slag (GGBS or GGBFS) is obtained by quenching molten iron slag (a by-product of iron and steel-making) from a blast furnace in water or steam, to produce a glassy, granular product that is then dried and ground into a fine powder. Ground granulated blast furnace slag is a latent hydraulic binder forming calcium silicate hydrates (C-S-H) after contact with water. It is a strength-enhancing compound improving the durability of concrete. It is a component of metallurgic cement (CEM III in the European norm EN 197). Its main advantage is its slow release of hydration heat, allowing limitation of the temperature increase in massive concrete components and structures during cement setting and concrete curing, or to cast concrete during hot summer.

== Production and composition ==
The chemical composition of a slag varies considerably depending on the composition of the raw materials in the iron production process. Silicate and aluminate impurities from the ore and coke are combined in the blast furnace with a flux which lowers the viscosity of the slag. In the case of pig iron production, the flux consists mostly of a mixture of limestone and forsterite or in some cases dolomite. In the blast furnace the slag floats on top of the iron and is decanted for separation. Slow cooling of slag melts results in an unreactive crystalline material consisting of an assemblage of Ca-Al-Mg silicates. To obtain a good slag reactivity or hydraulicity, the slag melt needs to be rapidly cooled or quenched below 800 °C in order to prevent the crystallization of merwinite and melilite. In order to cool and fragment the slag, a granulation process can be applied in which molten slag is subjected to jet streams of water or air under pressure. Alternatively, in the pelletization process, the liquid slag is partially cooled with water and subsequently projected into the air by a rotating drum. In order to obtain a suitable reactivity, the obtained fragments are ground to reach the same fineness as Portland cement.

The main components of blast furnace slag are CaO (30–50%), SiO_{2} (28–38%), Al_{2}O_{3} (8–24%), MnO, and MgO (1–18%). In general increasing the CaO content of the slag results in raised slag basicity and an increase in compressive strength. The MgO and Al_{2}O_{3} content show the same trend up to respectively 10–12% and 14%, beyond which no further improvement can be obtained. Several compositional ratios or so-called hydraulic indices have been used to correlate slag composition with hydraulic activity; the latter being mostly expressed as the binder compressive strength. The glass content of slags suitable for blending with Portland cement typically varies between 90 and 100% and depends on the cooling method and the temperature at which cooling is initiated. The glass structure of the quenched glass largely depends on the proportions of network-forming elements such as Si and Al over network-modifiers such as Ca, Mg and to a lesser extent Al. Increased amounts of network-modifiers lead to higher degrees of network depolymerization and reactivity.

Common crystalline constituents of blast-furnace slags are merwinite and melilite. Other minor components which can form during progressive crystallization are belite, monticellite, rankinite, wollastonite and forsterite. Minor amounts of reduced sulphur are commonly encountered as oldhamite.

== Applications ==
GGBS is used to make durable concrete structures in combination with ordinary Portland cement and/or other pozzolanic materials. GGBS has been widely used in Europe, and increasingly in the United States and in Asia (particularly in Japan and Singapore) for its superiority in concrete durability, extending the lifespan of buildings.

Two major uses of GGBS are in the production of quality-improved slag cement, namely Portland Blastfurnace cement (PBFC) and high-slag blast-furnace cement (HSBFC), with GGBS content ranging typically from 30 to 70%; and in the production of ready-mixed or site-batched durable concrete.

Concrete made with GGBS cement sets more slowly than concrete made with ordinary Portland cement, depending on the amount of GGBS in the cementitious material, but also continues to gain strength over a longer period in production conditions. This results in lower heat of hydration and lower temperature rises, and makes avoiding cold joints easier, but may also affect construction schedules where quick setting is required.

Use of GGBS significantly reduces the risk of damages caused by alkali–silica reaction (ASR), provides higher resistance to chloride ingress — reducing the risk of reinforcement corrosion — and provides higher resistance to attacks by sulfate and other chemicals.

== GGBS cement uses ==
GGBS cement can be added to concrete in the concrete manufacturer's batching plant, along with Portland cement, aggregates and water. The normal ratios of aggregates and water to cementitious material in the mix remain unchanged. GGBS is used as a direct replacement for Portland cement, on a one-to-one basis by weight. Replacement levels for GGBS vary from 30% to up to 85%. Typically 40% to 50% is used in most instances.

The use of GGBS in addition to Portland cement in concrete in Europe is covered in the concrete standard EN 206:2013. This standard establishes two categories of additions to concrete along with ordinary Portland cement: nearly inert additions (Type I) and pozzolanic or latent hydraulic additions (Type II). GGBS cement falls in the latter category. As GGBS cement is slightly less expensive than Portland cement, concrete made with GGBS cement will be similarly priced to that made with ordinary Portland cement.

It is used partially as per mix ratio.

== Architectural and engineering benefits ==
=== Durability ===
GGBS cement is routinely specified in concrete to provide protection against both sulfate attack and chloride attack. GGBS has now effectively replaced sulfate-resisting Portland cement (SRPC) on the market for sulfate resistance because of its superior performance and greatly reduced cost compared to SRPC. Most projects in Dublin's docklands, including Spencer Dock, are using GGBS in subsurface concrete for sulfate resistance.

Bulk Electrical Resistivity is a test method that can measure the resistivity of concrete samples. (ASTM 1876–19) The higher electrical resistivity can be an indication of higher ion transfer resistivity and thus higher durability. By replacing up to 50% GGBS in concrete, researchers have shown that some durability properties can be significantly improved.

To protect against chloride attack, GGBS is used at a replacement level of 50% in concrete. Instances of chloride attack occur in reinforced concrete in marine environments and in road bridges where the concrete is exposed to splashing from road de-icing salts. In most NRA projects in Ireland GGBS is now specified in structural concrete for bridge piers and abutments for protection against chloride attack. The use of GGBS in such instances will increase the life of the structure by up to 50% had only Portland cement been used, and precludes the need for more expensive stainless steel reinforcing.

GGBS is also routinely used to limit the temperature rise in large concrete pours. The more gradual hydration of GGBS cement generates both lower temperature peak and less total overall heat than Portland cement. This reduces thermal gradients in the concrete, which prevents the occurrence of microcracking which can weaken the concrete and reduce its durability, and was used for this purpose in the construction of the Jack Lynch Tunnel in Cork.

=== Appearance ===
In contrast to the stony grey of concrete made with Portland cement, the near-white color of GGBS cement permits architects to achieve a lighter color for exposed fair-faced concrete finishes, at no extra cost. To achieve a lighter color finish, GGBS is usually specified at replacement levels of between 50% and 70%, although levels as high as 85% can be used. GGBS cement also produces a smoother, more defect-free surface, due to the fineness of the GGBS particles. Dirt does not adhere to GGBS concrete as easily as concrete made with Portland cement, reducing maintenance costs. GGBS cement prevents the occurrence of efflorescence, the staining of concrete surfaces by calcium carbonate deposits. Due to its much lower lime content and lower permeability, GGBS is effective in preventing efflorescence when used at replacement levels of 50%-to-60%.

=== Strength ===
Concrete containing GGBS cement has a higher ultimate strength than concrete made with Portland cement. It has a higher proportion of the strength-enhancing calcium silicate hydrates (CSH) than concrete made with Portland cement only, and a reduced content of free lime, which does not contribute to concrete strength. Concrete made with GGBS continues to gain strength over time, and has been shown to double its 28-day strength over periods of 10 to 12 years.

The optimum dosage of Ground granulated blast-furnace slag (GGBS) for replacement in concrete was reported to be 20-30% by mass to provide higher compressive strength compared to the concrete made with only cement.

=== Sustainability ===
Since GGBS is a by-product of steel manufacturing process, its use in concrete is recognized by LEED, as well as Building Environmental Assessment Method (BEAM) Plus in Hong Kong, etc. as improving the sustainability of the project and will therefore add points towards LEED and BEAM Plus certifications. In this respect, GGBS can also be used for superstructure in addition to the cases where the concrete is in contact with chlorides and sulfates — provided that the slower setting time for casting of the superstructure is justified.
