= Calcium silicate hydrate =

Main product of the hydration of Portland cement

Calcium silicate hydrates (CSH or C-S-H) are the main products of the hydration of Portland cement and are primarily responsible for the strength of cement-based materials. They are the main binding phase (the "glue") in most concrete. Only well defined and rare natural crystalline minerals can be abbreviated as CSH while extremely variable and poorly ordered phases without well defined stoichiometry, as it is commonly observed in hardened cement paste (HCP), are denoted C-S-H.

== Preparation ==
When water is added to cement, each of the compounds undergoes hydration and contributes to the final state of the concrete. Only calcium silicates contribute to the strength. Tricalcium silicate is responsible for most of the early strength (first 7 days). Dicalcium silicate, which reacts more slowly, only contributes to late strength. Calcium silicate hydrate gel (also shown as C-S-H) is a result of the reaction between the silicate phases of Portland cement and water. This reaction typically is expressed as:

$\ce{2 Ca3SiO2 + 7 H2O -> 3 CaO * 2 SiO2 * 4 H2O + 3 Ca(OH)2}$ + 173.6 kJ

also written in cement chemist notation, (CCN) as:

$\ce{2 C3S + 7 H -> C3S2H4 + 3 CH}$ + heat

or, tricalcium silicate + water → calcium silicate hydrate + calcium hydroxide + heat

The stoichiometry of C-S-H in cement paste is variable and the state of chemically and physically bound water in its structure is not transparent, which is why "-" is used between C, S, and H.

Synthetic C-S-H can be prepared from the reaction of CaO and SiO_{2} in water or through the double precipitation method using various salts. These methods provide the flexibility of producing C-S-H at specific C/S (Ca/Si, or CaO/SiO_{2}) ratios. The C-S-H from cement phases can also be treated with an ammonium nitrate solution in order to induce calcium leaching, and so to achieve a given C/S ratio.

== Properties ==
C-S-H is a nano sized material with some degree of crystallinity as observed by X-ray diffraction techniques. The underlying atomic structure of C-S-H is similar to the naturally occurring mineral tobermorite. It has a layered geometry with calcium silicate sheet structure separated by an interlayer space. The silicates in C-S-H exist as dimers, pentamers and 3n-1 chain units (where n is an integer greater than 0) and calcium ions are found to connect these chains making the three dimensional nano structure as observed by dynamic nuclear polarisation surface-enhanced nuclear magnetic resonance. The exact nature of the interlayer remains unknown. One of the greatest difficulties in characterising C-S-H is due to its variable stoichiometry.

The scanning electron microscope micrographs of C-S-H do not show any specific crystalline form. They usually manifest as foils or needle/oriented foils.

Synthetic C-S-H can be schematically divided into two categories, depending on whether their Ca/Si molar ratio is below or above a threshold value of 1.1. There are several indications that the chemical, physical and mechanical characteristics of C-S-H vary noticeably between these two categories.

== See also ==
Other C-S-H minerals:

- Afwillite – Nesosilicate alteration mineral also sometimes found in hydrated cement paste
- Gyrolite – Rare phyllosilicate mineral crystallizing in small spheres (a rare mineral from hydrothermal alteration, or an ageing product of alkali-silica reaction)
- Jennite – Inosilicate alteration mineral in metamorphosed limestone and in skarn
- Thaumasite – Complex calcium silicate hydrate mineral
- Tobermorite – Inosilicate alteration mineral in metamorphosed limestone and in skarn
- Xonotlite – Calcium inosilicate mineral

Other calcium aluminium silicate hydrate, (C-A-S-H) minerals:

- Hydrogarnet – Calcium aluminium garnet
- Hydrotalcite – Hydrated Mg-Al layered double hydroxide (LDH) containing carbonate anions
- Tacharanite – Calcium aluminium silicate hydrate mineral (Ca_{12}Al_{2}Si_{18}O_{33}(OH)_{36}, and also Ca_{12}Al_{2}Si_{18}O_{51}(OH)_{2} · 18 H_{2}O)

Mechanisms of formation of C-S-H phases:

- Alkali–silica reaction – Chemical reaction damaging concrete
- Alkali–aggregate reaction – Expansive chemical reaction damaging concrete
- Energetically modified cement – Class of cements, mechanically processed to transform reactivity
- Pozzolanic reaction – Measure of chemical reaction in cement
