= Gyrolite =

Rare phyllosilicate mineral crystallizing in small spheres

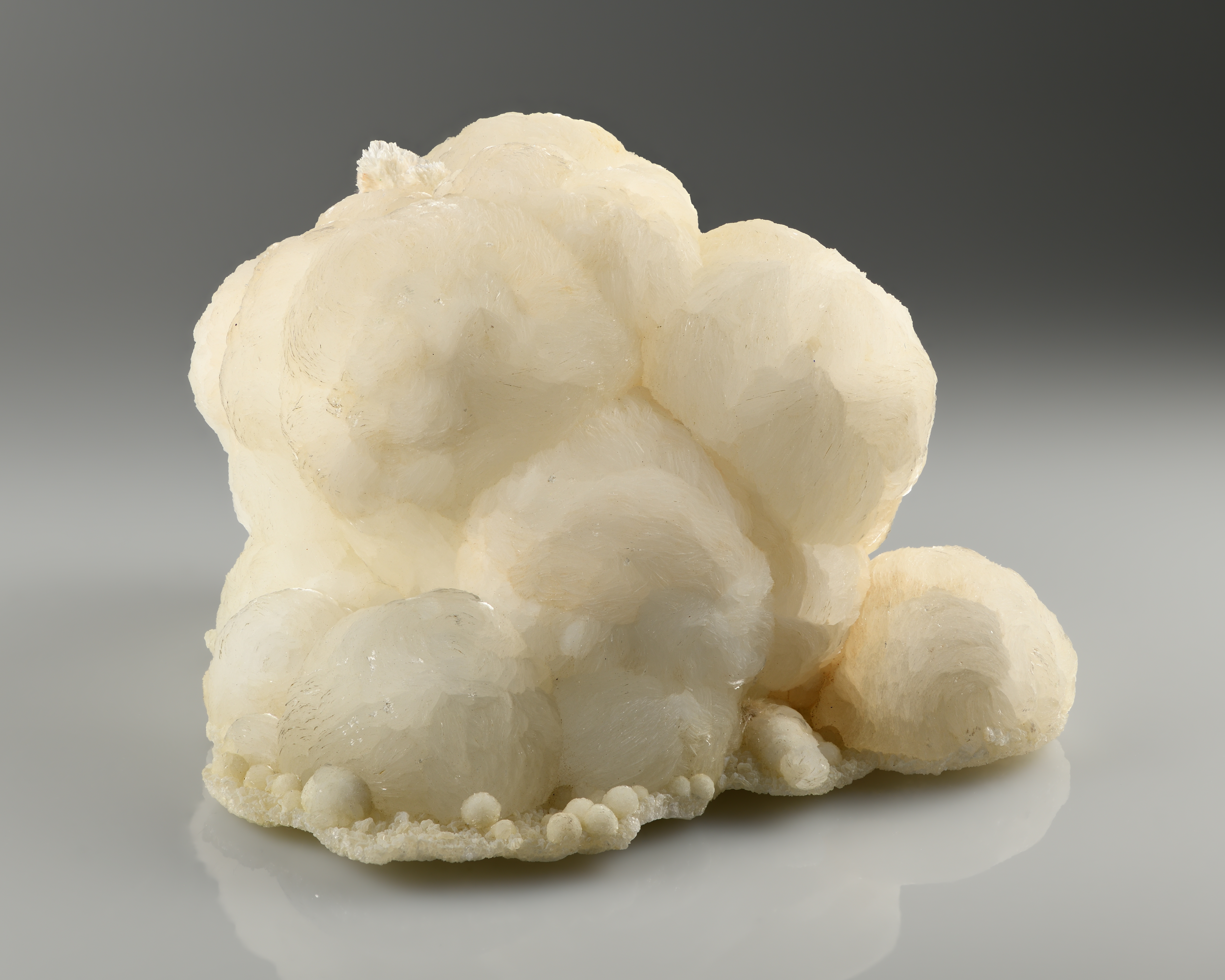
- Spherical colorless gyrolite crystals from Malad quarry, India

General
- Category: Phyllosilicate minerals
- Formula: NaCa_{16}(Si_{23}Al)O_{60}(OH)_{8}·14H_{2}O
- IMA symbol: Gyr
- Strunz classification: 9.EE.30
- Dana classification: 73.2.2c.1
- Crystal system: Triclinic
- Crystal class: Pinacoidal (1̅) (same H-M symbol)
- Space group: P1̅
- Unit cell: a = 9.74, b = 9.74 c = 22.4 [Å]; α = 95.71° β = 91.51°, γ = 120.01°; Z = 4

Identification
- Color: White, colorless, green, yellow or brown
- Crystal habit: Globular, compact, lamellar, platy
- Twinning: Lamellar
- Cleavage: Perfect on {001}
- Tenacity: Brittle
- Mohs scale hardness: 2 1/2
- Luster: Vitreous, pearly
- Diaphaneity: Transparent, translucent, opaque
- Density: 2.45–2.51
- Optical properties: Biaxial (−)
- Refractive index: n_{α} = 1.535 n_{β} = 1.548 n_{γ} = 1.549
- Birefringence: δ = 0.0140

Gyrolite, NaCa_{16}(Si_{23}Al)O_{60}(OH)_{8}·14H_{2}O, is a rare silicate mineral (basic sodium calcium silicate hydrate: N-C-S-H, in cement chemist notation) belonging to the class of phyllosilicates. Gyrolite is also often associated with zeolites. It is most commonly found as spherical or radial formations in hydrothermally altered basalt and basaltic tuffs. These formations can be glassy, dull or fibrous in appearance.

Gyrolite is also known as centrallasite, glimmer zeolite or gurolite.

== Discovery and natural occurrence ==
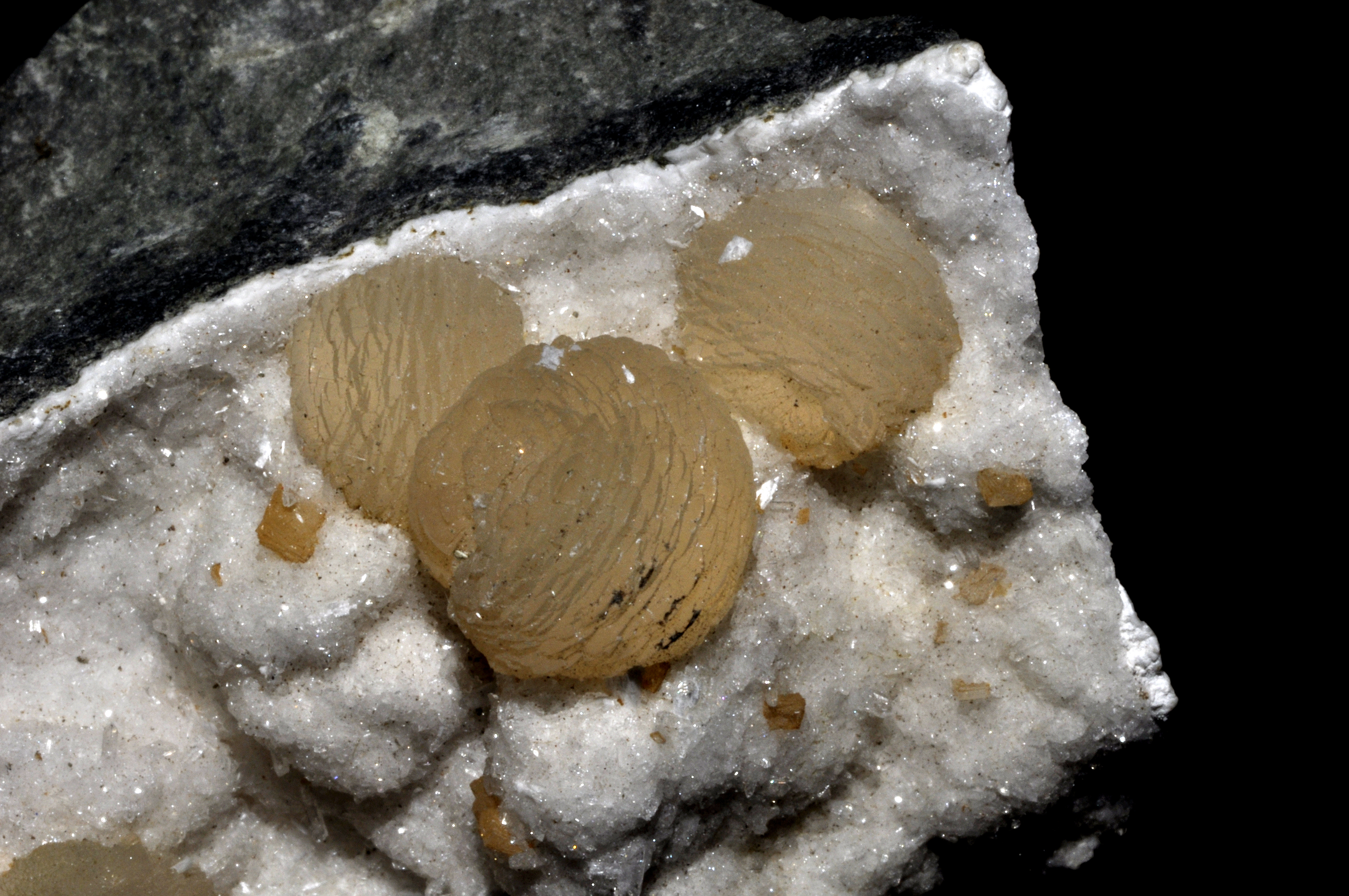
Spherical brown gyrolite crystals from Lonavala quarry, India

It was first described in 1851 for an occurrence at The Storr on the Isle of Skye, Scotland and is named from the ancient Greek word for circle, guros (γῦρος), based on the round form in which it is commonly found.

Minerals associated with gyrolite include apophyllite, okenite and many of the other zeolites. Gyrolite is found in Scotland, Ireland; Italy, Faroe Islands, Greenland, India, Japan, USA, Canada and various other localities.

== Occurrence in hardened cement paste and concrete ==
Gyrolite is also mentioned as a rare calcium silicate hydrate (C-S-H) phase in cement chemistry textbooks with a simplified formulation: Ca_{8}(Si_{4}O_{10})_{3}(OH)_{4} · ~6 H_{2}O, which is consistent with the general formulation given here above, but does not consider the isomorphic substitution of one silicon atom by one aluminum and one sodium atoms in its crystal lattice. Gyrolite may form at higher temperature in oilwell cement muds containing ground granulated blast furnace slags (GGBFS) activated by alkali. It could also form in CEM III cement-based concrete exposed to alkali-silica reaction (ASR) at elevated temperature.

== Hydrothermal synthesis ==
Gyrolite can be synthesized in the laboratory, or industrially, by hydrothermal reaction in the temperature range 150 – 250 °C by reacting CaO and amorphous SiO_{2}, or quartz, in saturated steam in the presence of CaSO_{4} salts or not. At temperature lower than 150 °C, the reaction rate is very slow. At temperature above 250 °C, gyrolite recrystallizes into 1.13 nm tobermorite and xonotlite.

Gyrolite is also one of the rare phases detected in situ along with pectolite by synchrotron X-rays diffraction in hydrothermal synthesis of cement. Synthetic gyrolite has also a large specific surface and could enter industrial applications as oil absorber. Gyrolite globular rosettes resemble that of shlykovite, a new natural crystalline C-S-H mineral characterized in 2010 and also to mountainite and rhodesite, other crystalline ASR products of the same family.

== See also ==
- Carbonatite – Igneous rock with more than 50% carbonate minerals
- Phyllosilicates – Rock-forming minerals with predominantly silicate anions
- Tacharanite – Calcium aluminium silicate hydrate mineral
- List of minerals
