= Apophyllite =

Phyllosilicate mineral

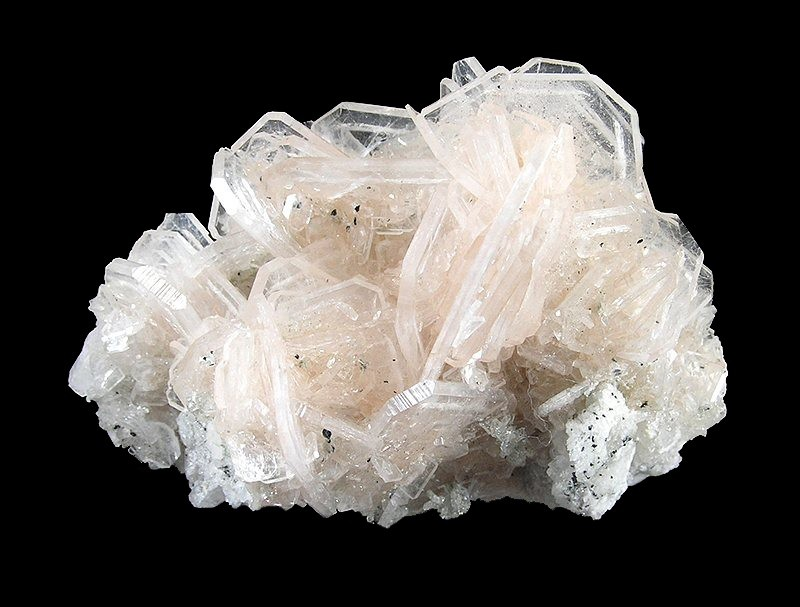

General
- Category: Phyllosilicate minerals
- Group: Apophyllite group
- Formula: (K,Na)Ca_{4}Si_{8}O_{20}(F,OH)·8H_{2}O
- IMA symbol: Apo
- Crystal system: Tetragonal
- Space group: P4/mnc

Identification
- Color: Usually white, colorless; also blue, green, brown, yellow, pink, violet
- Crystal habit: Prismatic, tabular, massive
- Cleavage: Perfect on (001)
- Fracture: Uneven
- Mohs scale hardness: 4.5–5
- Luster: Vitreous; pearly
- Streak: White
- Diaphaneity: Transparent to translucent
- Specific gravity: 2.3–2.4
- Refractive index: 1.536
- Birefringence: 0.000–0.003
- Pleochroism: Dichroic (colorless)
- Other characteristics: Radioactive 4.37% (K)

The name apophyllite refers to a specific group of phyllosilicates, a class of minerals. Originally, the group name referred to a specific mineral, but was redefined in 1978 to stand for a class of minerals of similar chemical makeup that comprise a solid solution series, and includes the members fluorapophyllite-(K), fluorapophyllite-(Na), hydroxyapophyllite-(K). The name apophyllite is derived from the Greek apophyllízo (ἀποφυλλίζω), meaning 'it flakes off', a reference to this class's tendency to flake apart when heated, due to water loss. Exfoliation of apophyllite is also possible by treating it with acids or simply by rubbing it. These minerals are typically found as secondary minerals in vesicles in basalt or other volcanic rocks. A recent change (2008) in the nomenclature system used for this group was approved by the International Mineralogical Association, removing the prefixes from the species names and using suffixes to designate the species. A subsequent nomenclature change approved by the International Mineralogical Association in 2013 renamed the minerals to include both suffixes and prefixes, as shown above.

Though relatively unfamiliar to the general public, apophyllites are fairly prevalent around the world, with specimens coming from some of the world's most well-known mineral localities. These localities include: Jalgaon, India; the Harz Mountains of Germany, Mont Saint-Hilaire in Canada, and Kongsberg, Norway, with other locations in Scotland, Ireland, Brazil, Japan, and throughout the United States.

== Structure ==
Apophyllite has an unusual structure for a phyllosilicate. Whereas most phyllosilicates have a T layer (silica backbone) consisting of interlocked 6-fold rings of silica tetrahedra, with pseudohexagonal symmetry, the T layer in apophyllite consists of interlocked 4-fold and 8-fold rings of silica tetrahedra with true tetragonal symmetry.

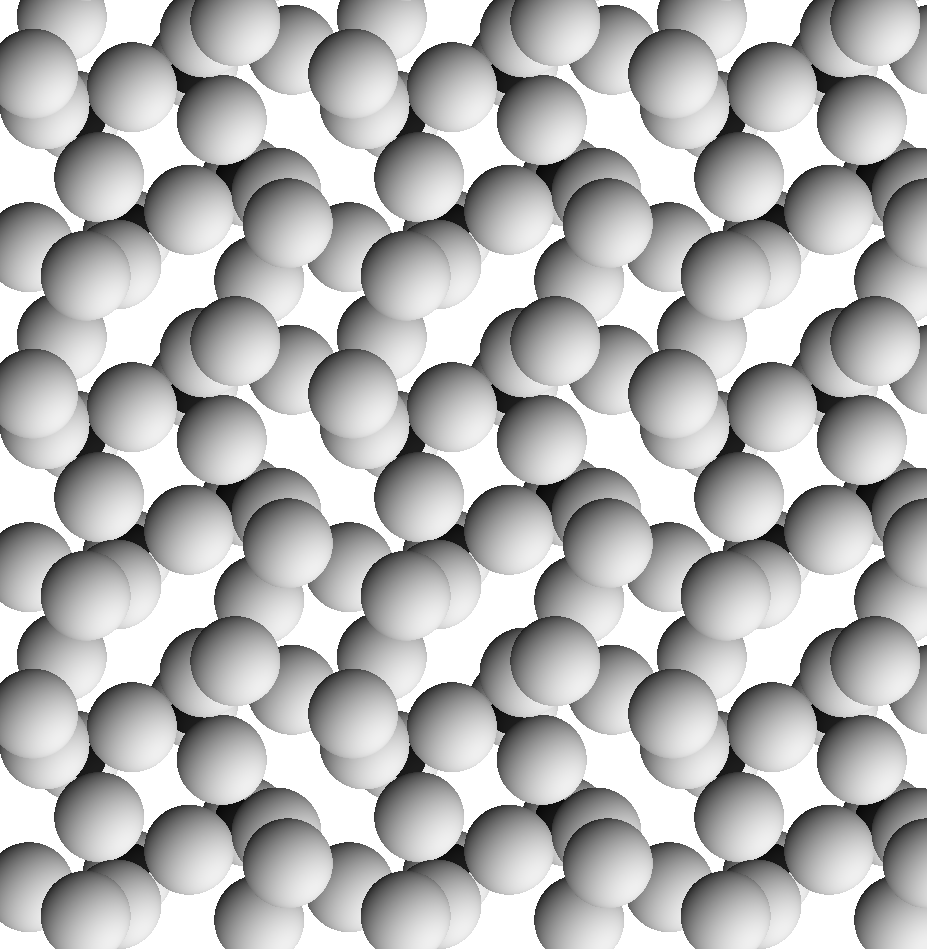
T layer (silica backbone layer) of apophyllite

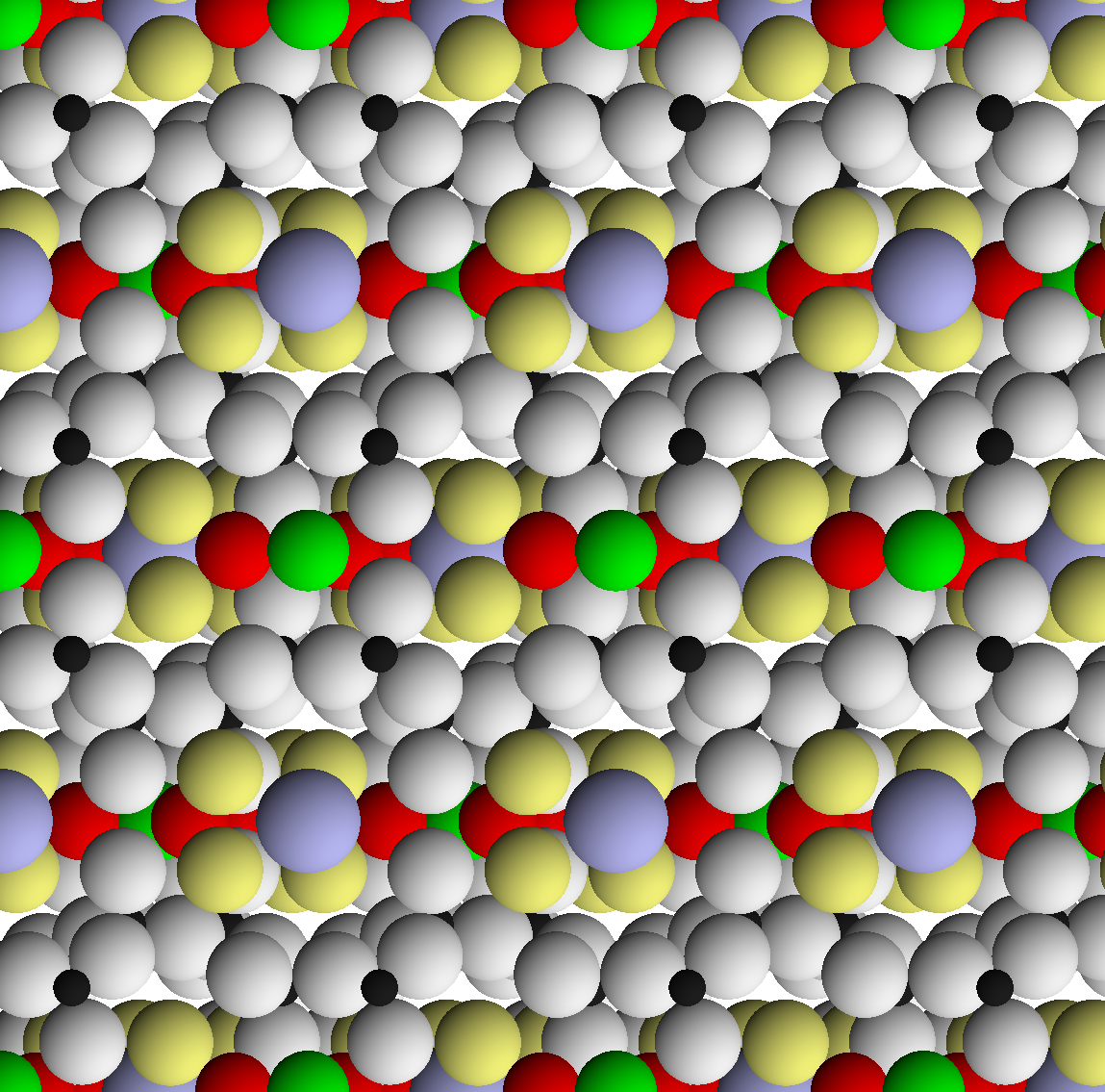
Structure of apophyllite viewed in the {100} direction, parallel to layering

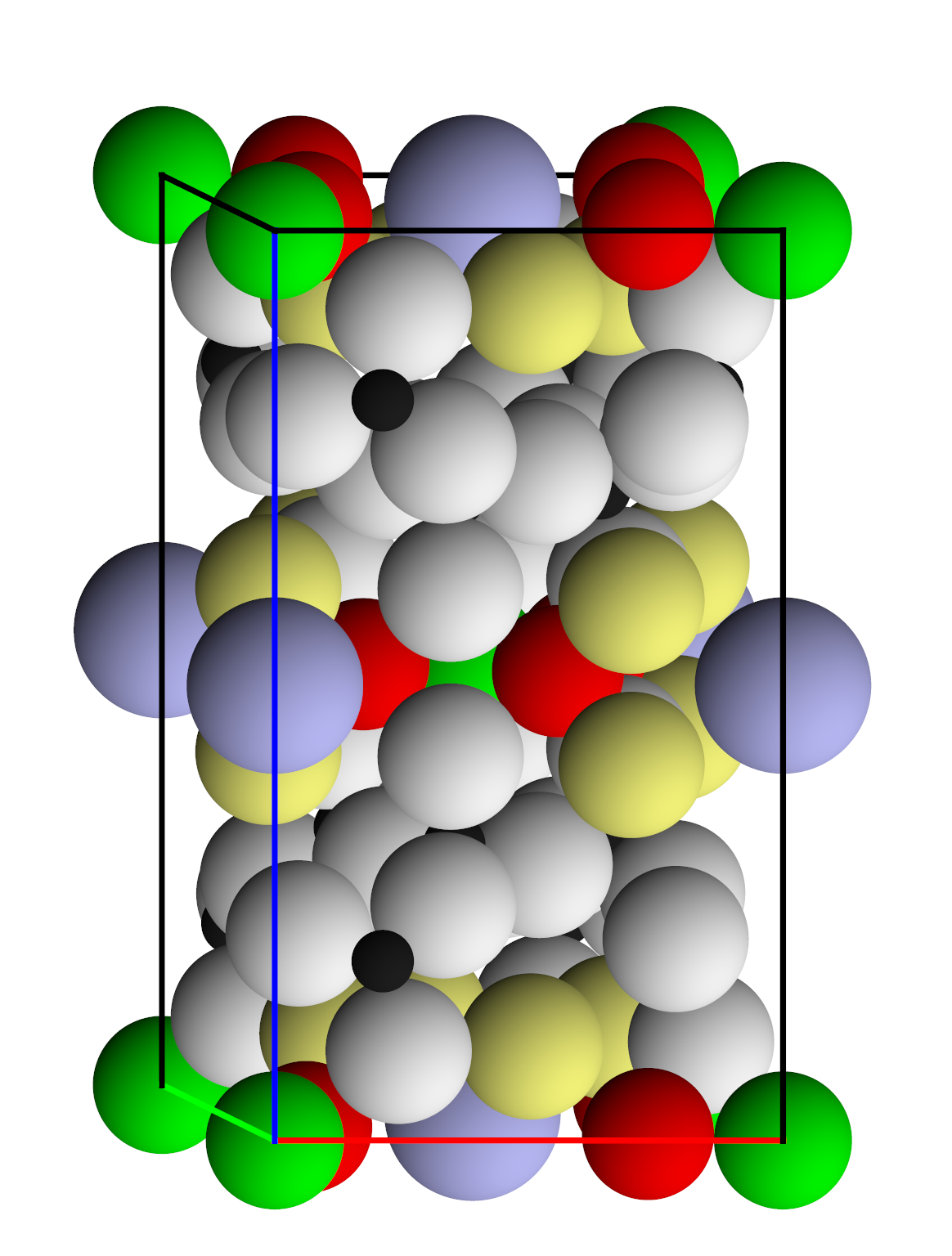
Unit cell of apophyllite

== Species ==
- Fluorapophyllite-(K) (formerly fluorapophyllite, apophyllite-(KF)), KCa_{4}Si_{8}O_{20}(F,OH)·8H_{2}O – white, colorless, yellow, green, violet
- Hydroxyapophyllite-(K) (formerly hydroxyapophyllite, apophyllite-(KOH)), KCa_{4}Si_{8}O_{20}(OH,F)·8H_{2}O – white, colorless
- Fluorapophyllite-(Na) (formerly natroapophyllite, apophyllite-(NaF)), NaCa_{4}Si_{8}O_{20}F·8H_{2}O – brown, yellow, colorless
- Fluorapophyllit-(Cs) (new) CsCa_{4}(Si_{8}O_{20})F·8H_{2}O
- Fluorapophyllit-(NH4) (new) NH_{4}Ca_{4}(Si_{8}O_{20})F⋅8H_{2}O
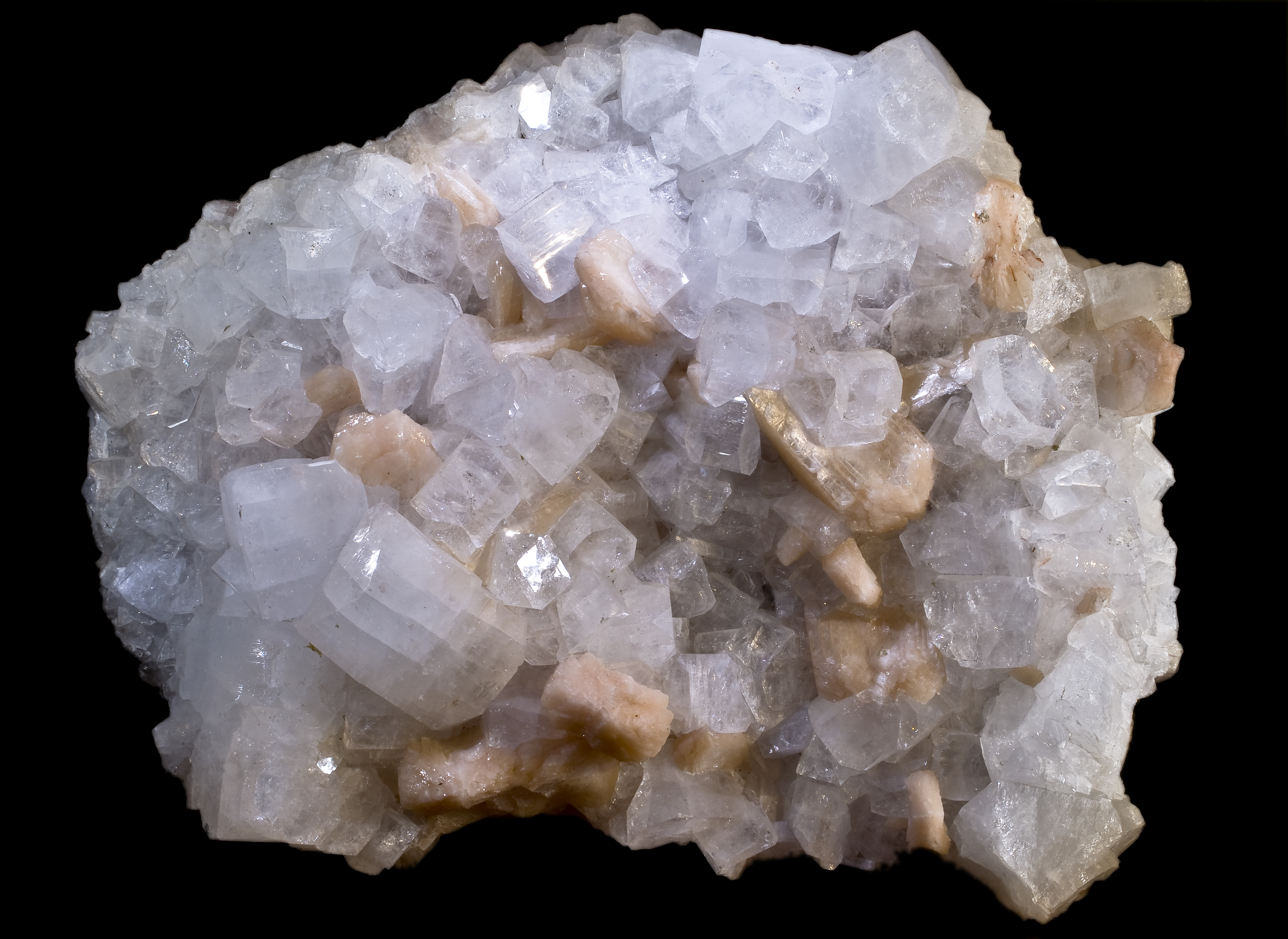
Fluorapophyllite-(K) and stilbite

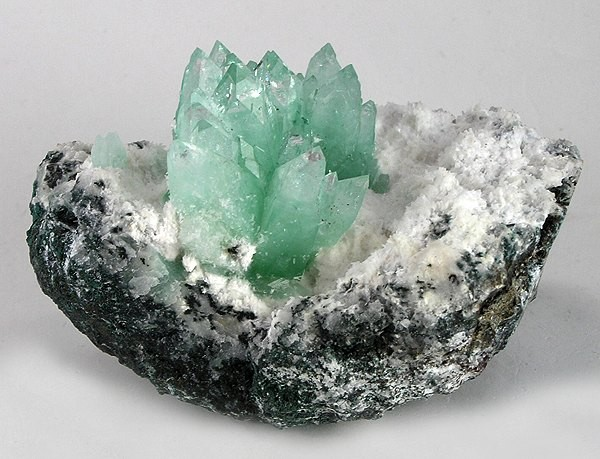
Isolated Fluorapophyllite-(K) cluster on contrasting matrix

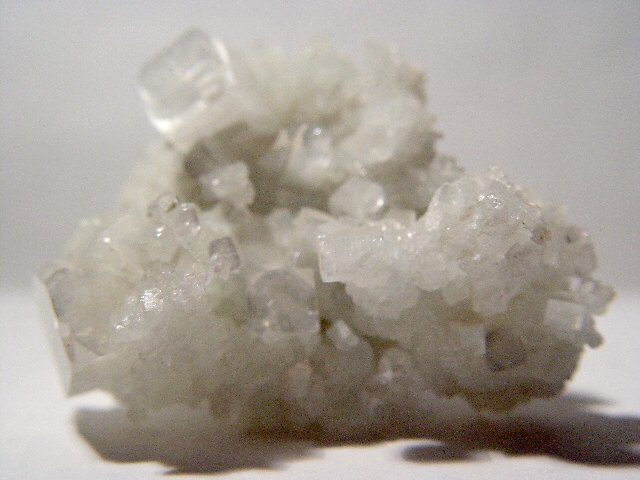
Hydroxyapophyllite

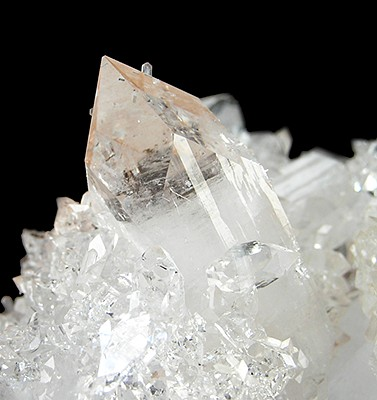
Fluorapophyllite-(Na)

== See also ==
- Carbonatite
- Gyrolite
- Zeolite
- List of minerals
