= Hydrogrossular =

Calcium aluminium garnet

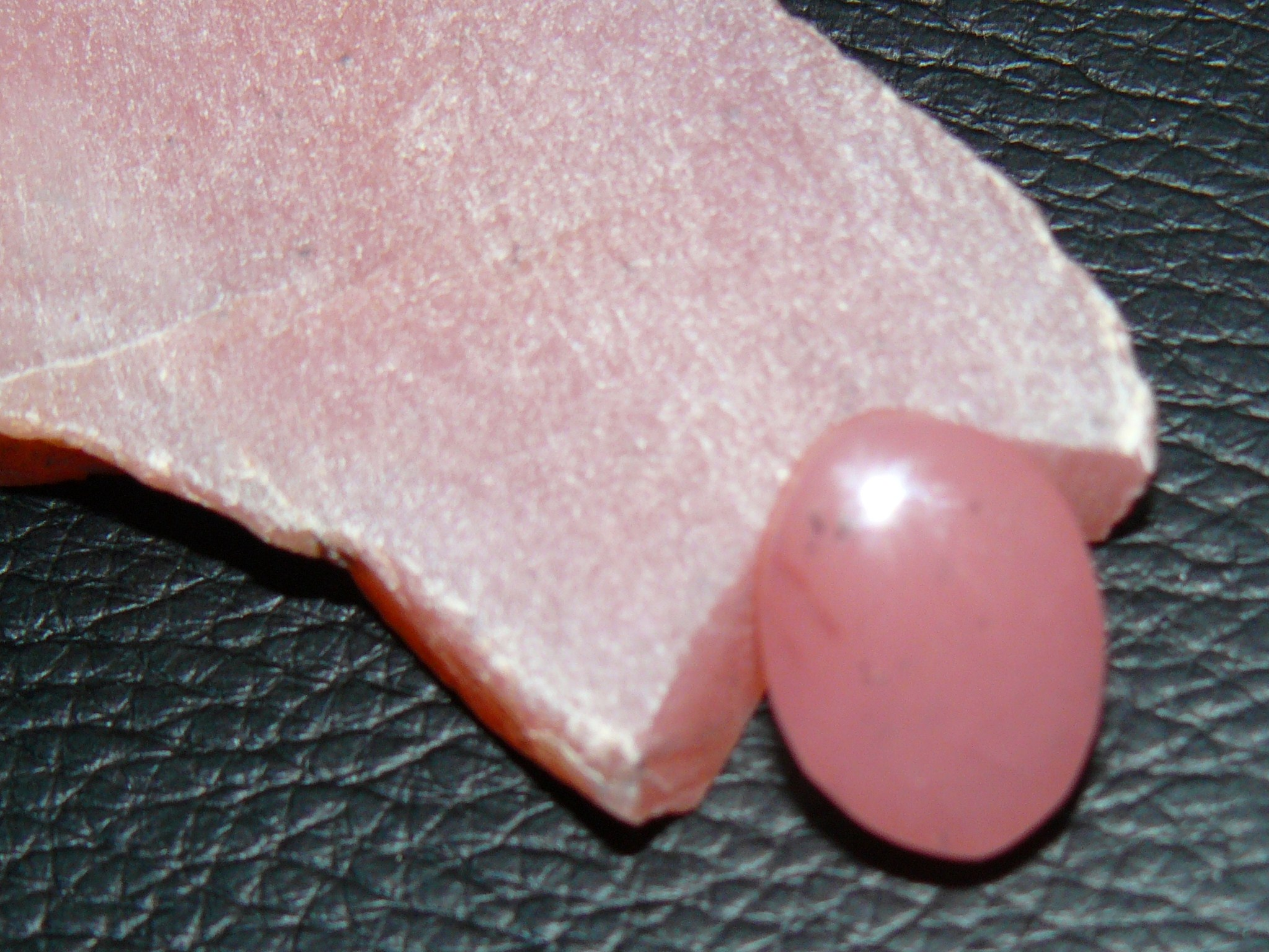

General
- Category: Nesosilicate
- Formula: Ca_{3}Al_{2}(SiO_{4})_{3−x}(OH)_{4x}
- IMA symbol: Hgrs
- Crystal system: Cubic

Identification
- Color: green to bluish green, pink, white, gray
- Crystal habit: Massive
- Cleavage: none
- Fracture: conchoidal
- Mohs scale hardness: 7–7.5
- Luster: vitreous
- Specific gravity: 4.15+0.05 −0.03
- Polish luster: vitreous to subadamantine
- Optical properties: single refractive, anomalous aggregate reaction
- Refractive index: 1.810+0.004 −0.020
- Birefringence: none
- Pleochroism: none
- Ultraviolet fluorescence: inert
- Absorption spectra: dark green hydrogrossular often shows cutoff below 460 nm. Other color stones may show line around 463 nm, indicating some idocrase content
- References: Gemological Institute of America

Hydrogrossular is a calcium aluminium garnet series (formula: Ca_{3}Al_{2}(SiO_{4})_{3−x}(OH)_{4x}, with hydroxide (OH) partially replacing silica (SiO_{4})). The endmembers of the hydrogarnet family (grossular, hibschite, and katoite) depend on the degree of substitution (x):

- grossular: x = 0
- hibschite: 0.2 < x < 1.5
- katoite: 1.5 < x < 3.

Hydrogrossular is a garnet variety in which a Si^{4+} is missing from a tetrahedral site. Charge balance is maintained by bonding a H^{+} to each of the four oxygens surrounding the vacant site.

Hydrogrossular is found in massive crystal habit, sometimes grown in with idocrase.

Hydrogrossular is translucent to opaque, and found in green to bluish green, pink, white, and gray. The cause of the green color is chromium, and possibly iron. Pink hydrogrossular is caused by the presence of manganese. Hydrogrossular may have dark gray to black small inclusions. It has similarities to jade, and has the misnomers Transvaal jade, and African jade.

Hydrogrossular is sometimes used as a gemstone, being cabochon cut, or made into beads. Sources for green and pink hydrogrossular are South Africa, Canada, and the United States. White hydrogrossular is sourced from Burma and China.
