= Pozzolana =

Natural siliceous or siliceous-aluminous material

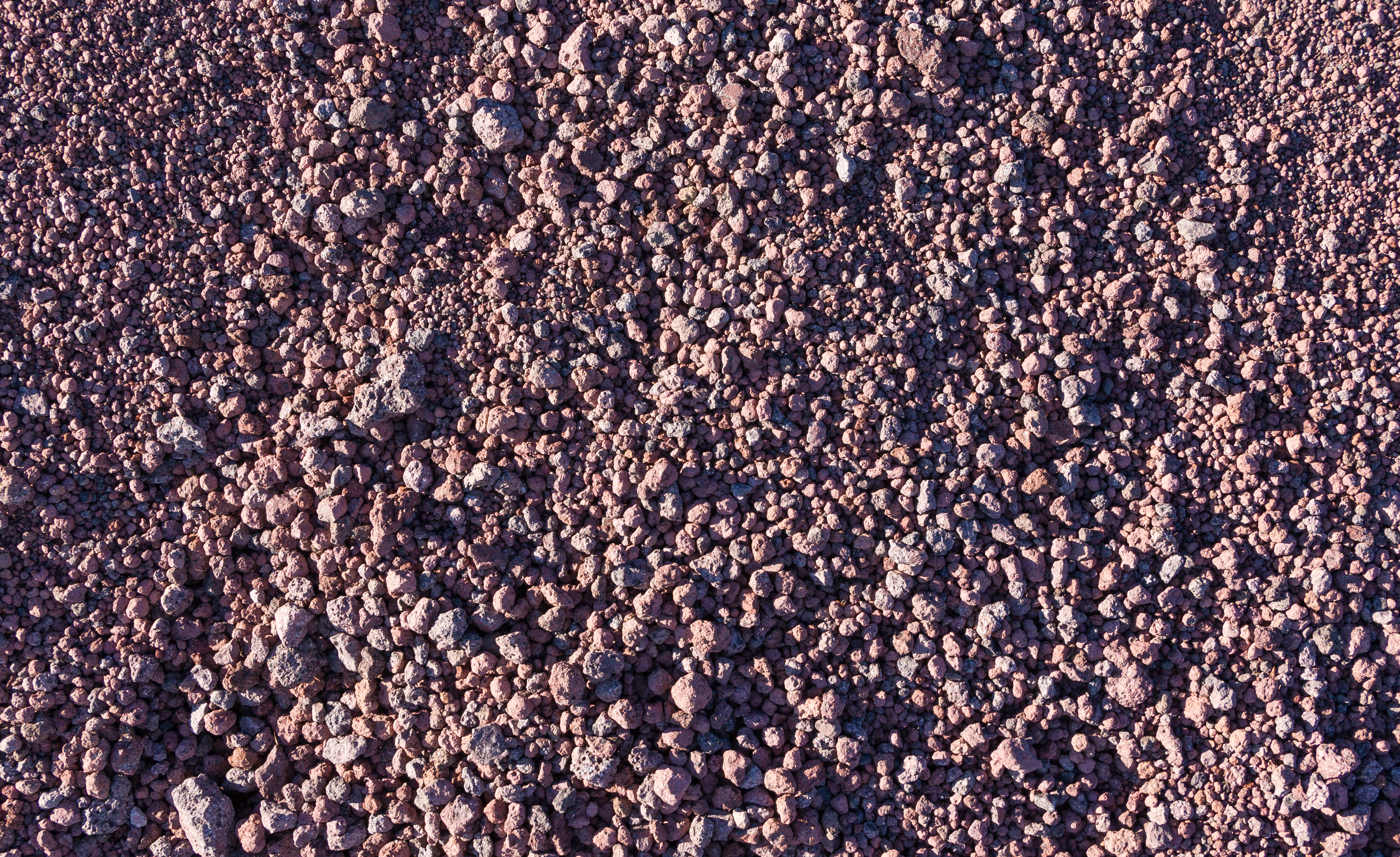
Pozzolana from Mount Vesuvius volcano, Italy

Pozzolana or pozzuolana (/ˌpɒts(w)əˈlɑːnə/ POT-s(w)ə-LAH-nə, Italian: [potts(w)oˈlaːna]), also known as pozzolanic ash (Latin: pulvis puteolanus), is a natural siliceous or siliceous-aluminous material that reacts with calcium hydroxide in the presence of water at room temperature (cf. pozzolanic reaction). In this reaction insoluble calcium silicate hydrate and calcium aluminate hydrate compounds are formed possessing cementitious properties. The designation pozzolana is derived from one of the primary deposits of volcanic ash used by the Romans in Italy, at Pozzuoli. The modern definition of pozzolana encompasses any volcanic material (pumice or volcanic ash), predominantly composed of fine volcanic glass, that is used as a pozzolan. Note the difference with the term pozzolan, which exerts no bearing on the specific origin of the material, as opposed to pozzolana, which can only be used for pozzolans of volcanic origin, primarily composed of volcanic glass.

== Historical use ==
Pozzolanas such as Santorin earth were used in the Eastern Mediterranean since 500–400 BC. Although pioneered by the ancient Greeks, it was the Romans who eventually fully developed the potential of lime-pozzolan pastes as binder phase in Roman concrete used for buildings and underwater construction. Vitruvius speaks of four types of pozzolana: black, white, grey, and red, all of which can be found in the volcanic areas of Italy, such as Naples. Typically it was very thoroughly mixed two-to-one with lime just prior to mixing with water. The Roman port at Cosa was built of pozzolana-lime concrete that was poured under water, apparently using a long tube to carefully lay it up without allowing sea water to mix with it. The three piers are still visible today, with the underwater portions in generally excellent condition even after more than 2100 years.

== Geochemistry and mineralogy ==
The major pozzolanically active component of volcanic pumices and ashes is a highly porous glass. The easily alterable, or highly reactive, nature of these ashes and pumices limits their occurrence largely to recently active volcanic areas. Most of the traditionally used natural pozzolans belong to this group, i.e., volcanic pumice from Pozzuoli, Santorin earth and the incoherent parts of German trass.

The chemical composition of pozzolana is variable and reflects the regional type of volcanism. SiO_{2} being the major chemical component, most unaltered pumices and ashes fall in the intermediate (52–66 wt% SiO_{2}) to acid (>66 wt% SiO_{2}) composition range for glassy rock types outlined by the IUGS. Basic (45–52 wt% SiO_{2}) and ultrabasic (<45 wt% SiO_{2}) pyroclastics are less commonly used as pozzolans. Al_{2}O_{3} is present in substantial amounts in most pozzolanas, Fe_{2}O_{3} and MgO are present in minor proportions only, as is typical or more acid rock types. CaO and alkali contents are usually modest but can vary substantially from pozzolana to pozzolana.

The mineralogical composition of unaltered pyroclastic rocks is mainly determined by the presence of phenocrysts and the chemical composition of the parent magma. The major component is volcanic glass typically present in quantities over 50 wt%. Pozzolana containing significantly less volcanic glass, such as a trachyandesite from Volvic (France) with only 25 wt% are less reactive. Apart from the glass content and its morphology associated with the specific surface area, also defects and the degree of strain in the glass appear to affect the pozzolanic activity. Typical associated minerals present as large phenocrysts are members of the plagioclase feldspar solid solution series. In pyroclastic rocks in which alkalis predominate over Ca, K-feldspar such as sanidine or albite Na-feldspar are found. Leucite is present in the K-rich, silica-poor Latium pozzolanas. Quartz is usually present in minor quantities in acidic pozzolanas, while pyroxenes and/or olivine phenocrysts are often found in more basic materials. Xenocrysts or rock fragments incorporated during the violent eruptional and depositional events are also encountered. Zeolite, opal CT and clay minerals are often present in minor quantities as alteration products of the volcanic glass. While zeolitisation or formation of opal CT is in general beneficial for the pozzolanic activity, clay formation has adverse effects on the performance of lime-pozzolan blends or blended cements.

== Modern use ==
Pozzolana is abundant in certain locations and is extensively used as an addition to Portland cement in countries such as Italy, Germany, Kenya, Uganda, Turkey, China and Greece. Compared to industrial by-product pozzolans they are characterized by larger ranges in composition and a larger variability in physical properties. The application of pozzolana in Portland cement is mainly controlled by the local availability of suitable deposits and the competition with the accessible industrial by-product supplementary cementitious materials. In part due to the exhaustion of the latter sources and the extensive reserves of pozzolana available, partly because of the proven technical advantages of an intelligent use of pozzolana, their use is expected to be strongly expanded in the future.

== Pozzolanic reaction ==
The pozzolanic reaction is the chemical reaction that occurs in portland cement containing pozzolans. It is the main reaction involved in the Roman concrete invented in Ancient Rome. At the basis of the pozzolanic reaction stands a simple acid-base reaction between calcium hydroxide (as Portlandite) and silicic acid.

== See also ==
- Ancient Roman use as underwater cement
  - Caesarea Maritima, the Herodian port
  - Ostia Antica, the Trajanic port
- Calcium silicate hydrate (CSH)
- Cement
- Cement chemist notation
- Concrete
- Energetically modified cement (EMC)
- Fly ash
- Metakaolin
- Portland cement
- Pozzolan
- Pozzolanic reaction (main page)
- Pumice
- Rice hull ash
- Roman concrete
- Silica fume
