= Alkali–silica reaction =

Chemical reaction damaging concrete

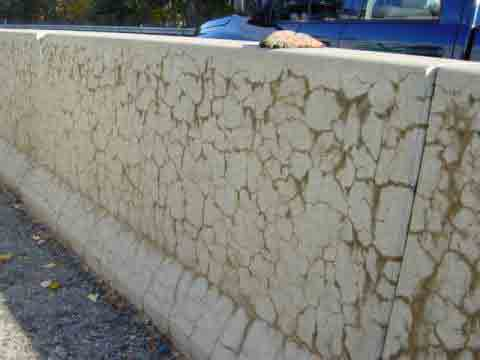
Characteristic crack pattern associated with the alkali–silica reaction affecting a concrete step barrier on a US highway. Note the typical fatty aspect of the silicagel exudations imbibing the concrete surface along the two sides of the cracks.

The alkali–silica reaction (ASR), also commonly known as concrete cancer, is a deleterious internal swelling reaction that occurs over time in concrete between the highly alkaline cement paste and the reactive amorphous (i.e., non-crystalline) silica found in many common aggregates, given sufficient moisture.

This deleterious chemical reaction causes the expansion of the altered aggregate by the formation of a soluble and viscous gel of sodium silicate (Na_{2}SiO_{3} · n H_{2}O, also noted Na_{2}H_{2}SiO_{4} · n H_{2}O, or N-S-H (sodium silicate hydrate), depending on the adopted convention). This hygroscopic gel swells and increases in volume when absorbing water: it exerts an expansive pressure inside the siliceous aggregate, causing spalling and loss of strength of the concrete, finally leading to its failure.

ASR can lead to serious cracking in concrete, resulting in critical structural problems that can even force the demolition of a particular structure. The expansion of concrete through reaction between cement and aggregates was first studied by Thomas E. Stanton in California during the 1930s with his founding publication in 1940.

== Chemistry ==
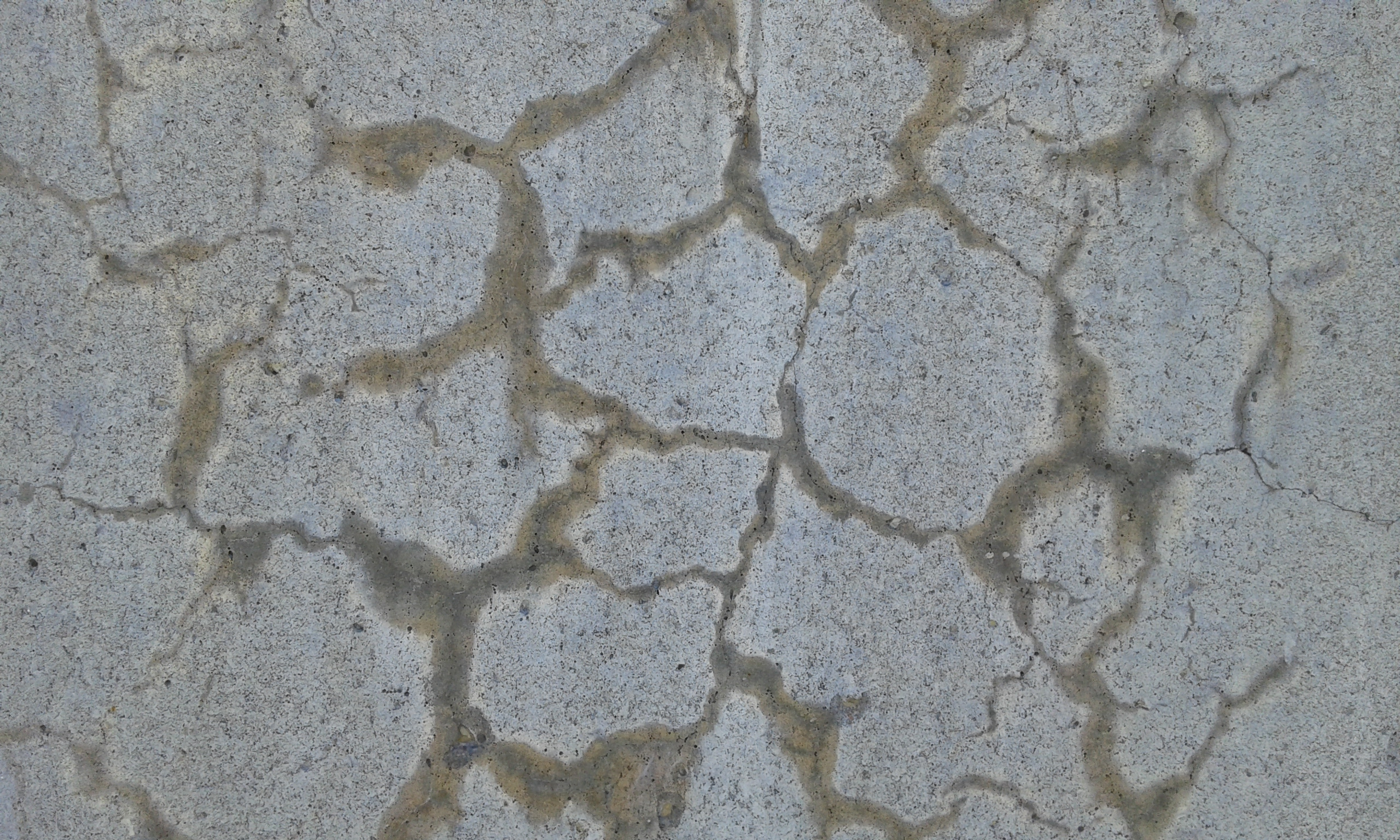
Typical crack pattern of the alkali-silica reaction (ASR). The gel exudations through the concrete cracks have a characteristic yellow color and a high pH. The fatty aspect of the exudations imbibing the concrete porosity along the cracks is also a distinctive feature of ASR.

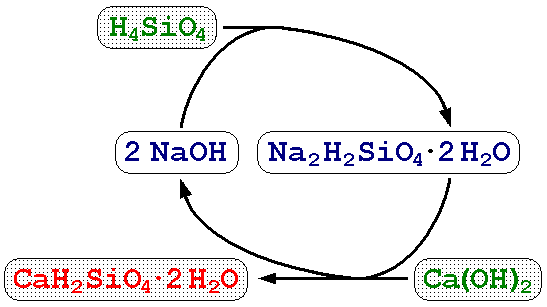
The alkali-silica reaction as a chemical cycle process

To attempt to simplify and to stylize a very complex set of various reactions, the whole ASR reaction, after its complete evolution (ageing process) in the presence of sufficient Ca^{2+} cations available in solution, could be compared to the pozzolanic reaction which would be catalysed by the undesirable presence of excessive concentrations of alkali hydroxides (NaOH and KOH) in the concrete. It is a mineral acid-base reaction between NaOH or KOH, calcium hydroxide, also known as portlandite, or (Ca(OH)_{2}), and silicic acid (H_{4}SiO_{4}, or Si(OH)_{4}). For simplification, after a complete exchange of the alkali cations with the calcium ions released by portlandite, the alkali-silica reaction in its ultimate stage leading to calcium silicate hydrate (C-S-H) could be schematically represented as follows:

Ca(OH)_{2} + H_{4}SiO_{4} → Ca^{2+} + H_{2}SiO_{4}^{2−} + 2 H_{2}O → CaH_{2}SiO_{4} · 2 H_{2}O

Here, the silicic acid H_{4}SiO_{4}, or Si(OH)_{4}, which is equivalent to SiO_{2} · 2 H_{2}O represents hydrous or amorphous silica for the sake of simplicity in aqueous chemistry.

Indeed, the term silicic acid has traditionally been used as a synonym for silica, SiO_{2}. Strictly speaking, silica is the anhydride of orthosilicic acid, Si(OH)_{4}.

SiO_{2}↓ + 2 H_{2}O ⇌ Si(OH)_{4}

An ancient industrial notation referring to H_{2}SiO_{3}, metasilicic acid, is also often used to depict the alkali-silica reaction. However, the metasilicic acid, H_{2}SiO_{3}, or SiO(OH)_{2}, is a hypothetic molecule which has never been observed, even in extreme diluted solutions because H_{2}SiO_{3} is unstable and continues to hydrate.

Indeed, contrary to the hydration of CO_{2} which consumes only one water molecule and stops at H_{2}CO_{3}, the hydration of SiO_{2} consumes two water molecules and continues one step further to form H_{4}SiO_{4}. The difference in hydration behaviour between SiO_{2} and CO_{2} is explained by thermodynamic reasons (Gibbs free energy) and by bond energy or steric hindrance around the central atom of the molecule.

This is why the more correct geochemical notation referring to the orthosilicic acid Si(OH)_{4} really existing in dilute solution is preferred here. However, the main advantage of the now deprecated, but still often used, industrial notation referring to the metasilicate anion (SiO^{2–}_{3}), which also does not exist in aqueous solution, is its greater simplicity and its direct similitude in notation with the carbonate (CO^{2–}_{3}) system.

One will also note that the NaOH and KOH species (alkali hydroxides, also often simply called alkali to refer to their strongly basic character) which catalyze and accelerate the silica dissolution in the alkali-silica reaction do not explicitly appear in this simplified representation of the ultimate reaction with portlandite, because they are continuously regenerated from the cation exchange reaction with portlandite. As a consequence, they disappear from the global mass balance equation of the catalyzed reaction.

=== Silica dissolution mechanism ===
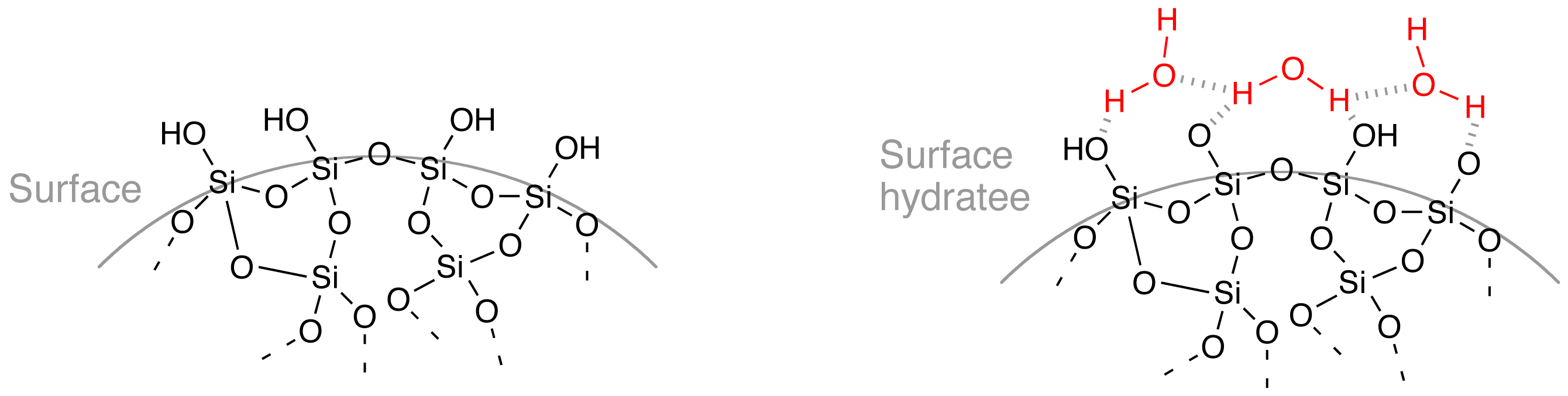
Anhydrous and hydrated silica surface with siloxane and silanol groups along with surface bound water molecules.

The surface of solid silica in contact with water is covered by siloxane bonds (≡Si–O–Si≡) and silanol groups (≡Si–OH) sensitive to an alkaline attack by OH^{−} ions.

The presence of these oxygen-bearing groups very prone to form hydrogen bonds with water molecules explains the affinity of silica for water and makes colloidal silica very hydrophilic.

Siloxane bonds may undergo hydrolysis and condensation reactions as schematically represented hereafter:

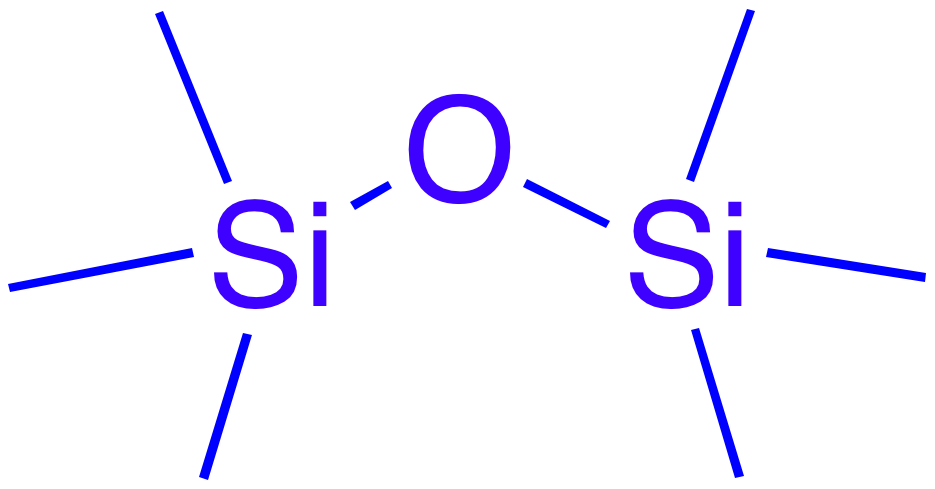
Siloxane bond between two silicon atoms.

≡Si–O–Si≡ + H_{2}O ↔ ≡Si–OH + HO–Si≡
=Si=O + H_{2}O ↔ =Si(–OH)_{2}

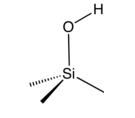
Chemical structure of a silanol group.

On the other hand, silanol groups can also undergo protonation/deprotonation:

≡Si–OH ↔ ≡Si–O^{−} + H^{+}.

These equilibria can be shifted towards the right side of the reaction leading to silica dissolution by increasing the concentration of the hydroxide anion (OH^{–}), i.e., by increasing the pH of the solution.

Alkaline hydrolysis of siloxane bonds occurs by nucleophilic substitution of OH^{–} onto a silicon atom, while another ^{–}O–Si group is leaving to preserve the tetravalent character of Si atom:

≡Si–O–Si≡ + OH^{−} → ≡Si–OH + ^{–}O–Si≡
=Si=O + OH^{−} → =SiO(OH)^{−}

Deprotonation of silanol groups:

≡Si–OH + OH^{−} → ≡Si–O^{−} + H_{2}O.

In the pH range 0 – 7, the solubility of silica is constant, but above pH=8, the hydrolysis of siloxane bonds and deprotonation of silanol groups exponentially increase with the pH value. This is why glass easily dissolves at high pH values and does not withstand extremely basic NaOH/KOH solutions. Therefore, NaOH/KOH is released during cement hydration attacks and dissolves the tridimensional network of silica present in the aggregates. Amorphous or poorly crystallized silica, such as cryptocrystalline chalcedony or chert present in flints (in chalk) or rolled river gravels, is much more soluble and sensitive to alkaline attack by OH^{–} anions than well crystallized silica such as quartz. Strained (deformed) quartz or chert exposed to freeze-thaw cycles in Canada and Nordic countries are also more sensitive to alkaline (high pH) solutions.

The species responsible for silica dissolution is the hydroxide anion (OH^{–}). The high pH conditions are said to be alkaline and one also speaks of the alkalinity of the basic solutions. For the sake of electroneutrality, (OH^{–}) anions need to be accompanied by positively charged cations, Na^{+} or K^{+} in NaOH or KOH solutions, respectively. Na and K both belong to the alkali metals column in the Periodic Table. When speaking of alkalis, one systematically refers to NaOH and KOH basic hydroxides, or their corresponding oxides Na_{2}O and K_{2}O in cement. Therefore, it is the hydroxide, or the oxide, component of the salt which is the only relevant chemical species for silica dissolution, not the alkali metal in itself. However, to determine the alkali equivalent content (Na_{2}O_{eq}) in cement, because of the need to maintain electroneutrality in solids or in solution, one directly measures the contents of cement in Na and K elements and one conservatively considers that their counter ions are the hydroxide ions. As Na^{+} and K^{+} cations are hydrated species, they also contribute to retain water in alkali-silica reaction products.

Osmotic processes (Chatterji et al., 1986, 1987, 1989) and the electrical double layer (EDL) play also a fundamental role in the transport of water towards the concentrated liquid alkali gel, explaining their swelling behavior and the deleterious expansion of aggregates responsible of ASR damages in concrete.

=== Catalysis of ASR by dissolved NaOH or KOH ===
The ASR reaction significantly differs from the pozzolanic reaction by the fact that it is catalysed by soluble alkali hydroxides (NaOH / KOH) at very high pH. It can be represented as follows using the classical geochemical notation for representing silica by the fully hydrated dissolved silica (Si(OH)_{4} or silicic acid: H_{4}SiO_{4}), while in an older industrial notation the non-existing (H_{2}SiO_{3}, hemihydrated silica, is considered in analogy to carbonic acid):

2 Na(OH) + H_{4}SiO_{4} → Na_{2}H_{2}SiO_{4} · 2 H_{2}O

The so-produced soluble alkali silicagel can then react with calcium hydroxide (portlandite) to precipitate insoluble calcium silicate hydrates (C-S-H phases) and regenerate NaOH, thus continuing the initial silica dissolution reaction:

Na_{2}H_{2}SiO_{4} · 2 H_{2}O + Ca(OH)_{2} → CaH_{2}SiO_{4} · 2 H_{2}O + 2 NaOH

The combination of the two above mentioned reactions gives a general reaction resembling the pozzolanic reaction, but it is important to keep in mind that this reaction is catalysed by the undesirable presence in cement, or other concrete components, of soluble alkaline hydroxides (NaOH / KOH) responsible for the dissolution of the silica (silicic acid) at high pH:

Ca(OH)_{2} + H_{4}SiO_{4} → CaH_{2}SiO_{4} · 2 H_{2}O

Without the presence of dissolved NaOH or KOH, responsible for the high pH (~13.5) of the concrete pore water, the amorphous silica of the reactive aggregates would not be dissolved and the reaction would not evolve. Moreover, the soluble sodium or potassium silicate is very hygroscopic and swells when it absorbs water. When the sodium silicate gel forms and swells inside a porous siliceous aggregate, it first expands and occupies the free porosity. When this latter is completely filled, and if the soluble but very viscous gel cannot be easily expelled from the silica network, the hydraulic pressure rises inside the attacked aggregate and leads to its fracture. The hydro-mechanical expansion of the damaged siliceous aggregate surrounded by calcium-rich hardened cement paste is responsible for the development of a network of cracks in concrete. When the sodium silicate expelled from the aggregate encounters grains of portlandite present in the hardened cement paste, an exchange between sodium and calcium cations occurs and hydrated calcium silicate (C-S-H) precipitates with a concomitant release of NaOH. In its turn, the regenerated NaOH can react with the amorphous silica aggregate, leading to an increased production of soluble sodium silicate. When a continuous rim of C-S-H completely envelops the external surface of the attacked siliceous aggregate, it behaves as a semi-permeable barrier and hinders the expulsion of the viscous sodium silicate while allowing the NaOH / KOH to diffuse from the hardened cement paste inside the aggregate. This selective barrier of C-S-H contributes to increase the hydraulic pressure inside the aggregate and aggravates the cracking process. It is the expansion of the aggregates which damages concrete in the alkali-silica reaction.

Portlandite (Ca(OH)_{2}) represents the main reserve of OH^{–} anions in the solid phase as suggested by Davies and Oberholster (1988) and emphasized by Wang and Gillott (1991). As long as portlandite, or the siliceous aggregates, has not become completely exhausted, the ASR reaction will continue. The alkali hydroxides are continuously regenerated by the reaction of the sodium silicate with portlandite and thus represent the transmission belt of the ASR reaction driving it to completeness. It is thus impossible to interrupt the ASR reaction. The only way to avoid ASR in the presence of siliceous aggregates and water is to maintain the concentration of soluble alkali (NaOH and KOH) at the lowest possible level in concrete, so that the catalysis mechanism becomes negligible.

=== Analogy with the soda lime and concrete carbonatation ===
The alkali-silica reaction mechanism catalysed by a soluble strong base as NaOH or KOH in the presence of Ca(OH)_{2} (alkalinity buffer present in the solid phase) can be compared with the carbonatation process of soda lime. The silicic acid (H_{2}SiO_{3} or SiO_{2}) is simply replaced in the reaction by the carbonic acid (H_{2}CO_{3} or CO_{2}).

(1)	CO_{2} + 2 NaOH	→	Na_{2}CO_{3} + H_{2}O	(CO_{2} trapping by soluble NaOH)
(2)	Na_{2}CO_{3} + Ca(OH)_{2}	→	CaCO_{3} + 2 NaOH	(regeneration of NaOH after reaction with lime)
sum (1+2)	CO_{2} + Ca(OH)_{2}	→	CaCO_{3} + H_{2}O	(global reaction)

In the presence of water or simply ambient moisture, the strong bases, NaOH or KOH, readily dissolve in their hydration water (hygroscopic substances, deliquescence phenomenon), and this greatly facilitates the catalysis process because the reaction in aqueous solution occurs much faster than in the dry solid phase. The moist NaOH impregnates the surface and the porosity of calcium hydroxide grains with a high specific surface area. Soda lime is commonly used in closed-circuit diving rebreathers and in anesthesia systems.

The same catalytic effect of the alkali hydroxides (function of the Na_{2}O_{eq} content of cement) also contributes to the carbonatation of portlandite by atmospheric CO_{2} in concrete although the rate of propagation of the reaction front is there essentially limited by the CO_{2} diffusion within the concrete matrix less porous.

The soda lime carbonatation reaction can be directly translated into the ancient industrial notation of silicate (referring to the never observed metasilicic acid) simply by substituting a C atom by a Si atom in the mass balance equations (i.e., by replacing a carbonate by a metasilicate anion). This gives the following set of reactions also commonly encountered in the literature to schematically depict the continuous regeneration of NaOH in ASR:

(1)	SiO_{2} + 2 NaOH	→	Na_{2}SiO_{3} + H_{2}O	(SiO_{2} quickly dissolved by hygroscopic NaOH)
(2)	Na_{2}SiO_{3} + Ca(OH)_{2}	→	CaSiO_{3} + 2 NaOH	(regeneration of NaOH after reaction with portlandite)
sum (1+2)	SiO_{2} + Ca(OH)_{2}	→	CaSiO_{3} + H_{2}O	(global reaction resembling the Pozzolanic reaction)

If NaOH is clearly deficient in the system under consideration (soda lime or alkali-silica reaction), it is formally possible to write the same reactions sets by simply replacing the CO_{3}^{2-} anions by HCO_{3}^{−} and the SiO_{3}^{2-} anions by HSiO_{3}^{−}, the principle of catalysis remaining the same, even if the number of intermediate species differs.

=== Main sources of OH^{−} in hardened cement paste ===
One can distinguish several sources of hydroxide anions (OH^{−}) in hardened cement paste (HCP) from the family of Portland cement (pure OPC, with BFS, or with cementitious additions, FA or SF).

==== Direct sources ====
OH^{−} anions can be directly present in the HCP pore water or be slowly released from the solid phase (main buffer, or solid stock) by the dissolution of Ca(OH)_{2} (portlandite) when its solubility increases when high pH value starts to drop. Beside these two main sources, ions exchange reactions and precipitation of poorly soluble calcium salts can also contribute to release OH^{−} into solution.

Alkali hydroxides, NaOH and KOH, arise from the direct dissolution of Na_{2}O and K_{2}O oxides produced by the pyrolysis of the raw materials at high temperature (1450 °C) in the cement kiln. The presence of minerals with high Na and K contents in the raw materials can thus be problematic. The ancient wet manufacturing process of cement, consuming more energy (water evaporation) that the modern dry process, had the advantage to eliminate much of the soluble Na and K salts present in the raw material.

As previously described in the two sections dealing respectively with ASR catalysis by alkali hydroxides and soda lime carbonatation, soluble NaOH and KOH are continuously regenerated and released into solution when the soluble alkali silicate reacts with Ca(OH)_{2} to precipitate insoluble calcium silicate. As suggested by Davies and Oberholster (1988), the alkali-silica reaction is self-perpetuating as the alkali hydroxides are continuously regenerated in the system. Therefore, portlandite is the main buffer of OH^{−} in the solid phase. As long as the stock of hydroxides in the solid phase is not exhausted, the alkali-silica reaction can continue to proceed until the complete disparition of one of the reagents (Ca(OH)_{2} or SiO_{2}) involved in the pozzolanic reaction.

==== Indirect sources ====
There exist also other indirect sources of OH^{−}, all related to the presence of soluble Na and K salts in the pore water of hardened cement paste (HCP). The first category contains soluble Na and K salts whose corresponding anions can precipitate an insoluble calcium salts, e.g., Na_{2}SO_{4}, Na_{2}CO_{3}, Na_{3}PO_{4}, NaB(OH)_{4}, Na_{2}B_{4}O_{7}, ... .

Hereafter, an example for calcium sulfate (gypsum, anhydrite) precipitation releasing sodium hydroxide:

Na_{2}SO_{4} + Ca(OH)_{2} → CaSO_{4} + 2 NaOH

or, the reaction of sodium carbonate with portlandite, also important for the catalysis of the alkali–carbonate reaction as emphasized by Fournier and Bérubé (2000) and Bérubé et al. (2005):

Na_{2}CO_{3} + Ca(OH)_{2} → CaCO_{3} + 2 NaOH

However, not all Na or K soluble salts can precipitate insoluble calcium salts, such as, e.g., NaCl-based deicing salts:

2 NaCl + Ca(OH)_{2} ← CaCl_{2} + 2 NaOH

As calcium chloride is a soluble salt, the reaction cannot occur and the chemical equilibrium regresses to the left side of the reaction.

So, a question arises: can NaCl or KCl from deicing salts still possibly play a role in the alkali-silica reaction? Na^{+} and K^{+} cations in themselves cannot attack silica (the culprit is their counter ion OH^{−}), and soluble alkali chlorides cannot produce soluble alkali hydroxide by interacting with calcium hydroxide. So, does it exist another route to still produce hydroxide anions in the hardened cement paste (HCP)?

Beside portlandite, other hydrated solid phases are present in HCP. The main phases are the calcium silicate hydrates (C-S-H) (the "glue" in cement paste), calcium sulfo-aluminate phases (AFm and AFt, ettringite) and hydrogarnet. C-S-H phases are less soluble (~ 10^{−5} M) than portlandite (CH) (~ 2.2 10^{−2} M at 25 °C) and therefore are expected to play a negligible role for the calcium ions release.

An anion-exchange reaction between chloride ions and the hydroxide anions contained in the lattice of some calcium aluminate hydrates (C-A-H), or related phases (C-A-S-H, AFm, AFt), is suspected to also contribute to the release of hydroxide anions into solution. The principle mechanism is schematically illustrated hereafter for C-A-H phases:

Cl^{−} + (C-A-H)–OH → (C-A-H)–Cl + OH^{−}

As a simple, but robust, conclusion, the presence of soluble Na and K salts can also cause, by precipitation of poorly soluble calcium salt (with portlandite, CH) or anion exchange reactions (with phases related to C-A-H), the release of OH^{−} anions into solution. Therefore, the presence of any salts of Na and K in cement pore water is undesirable and the measurements of Na and K elements is a good proxy (indicator) for the maximal concentration of OH^{−} in pore solution. This is why the total alkali equivalent content (Na_{2}O_{eq}) of cement can simply rely on the measurements of Na and K (e.g., by ICP-AES, AAS, XRF measurements techniques).

=== Alkali gel evolution and ageing ===
The maturation process of the fluid alkali silicagel found in exudations into less soluble solid products found in gel pastes or in efflorescences is described hereafter. Four distinct steps are considered in this progressive transformation.

1. SiO_{2} dissolution and Na_{2}SiO_{3} formation (here, explicitly written in the ancient industrial metasilicate notation (based on the non-existing metasilicic acid, H_{2}SiO_{3}) to also illustrate the frequent use of this later in the literature):

2 NaOH + SiO_{2} → Na_{2}SiO_{3} · H_{2}O (young N-S-H gel)
This reaction is accompanied by hydration and swelling of the alkali gel leading to the expansion of the affected aggregates. The pH of the fresh alkali gel is very high and it has often a characteristic amber color. The high pH of young alkali gel exudations often precludes the growth of mosses at the surface of concrete crack infilling.

2. Maturation of the alkali gel: polymerisation and gelation by the sol–gel process. Condensation of silicate monomers or oligomers dispersed in a colloidal solution (sol) into a biphasic aqueous polymeric network of silicagel. Ca^{2+} divalent cations released by calcium hydroxide (portlandite) when the pH starts to slightly drop may influence the gelation process.

3. Cation exchange with calcium hydroxide (portlandite) and precipitation of amorphous calcium silicate hydrates (C-S-H) accompanied by NaOH regeneration:

Na_{2}SiO_{3} + Ca(OH)_{2} → CaSiO_{3} + 2 NaOH

Amorphous non-stoechiometric calcium silicate hydrates (C-S-H, the non-stoechiometry being denoted here by the use of dashes) can recrystallize into rosettes similar to these of gyrolite. The C-S-H formed at this stage can be considered an evolved calcium silicate hydrate.

4. Carbonation of the C-S-H leading to precipitation of calcium carbonate and amorphous SiO_{2} stylized as follows:

CaSiO_{3} + CO_{2} → CaCO_{3} + SiO_{2}

As long as the alkali gel (Na_{2}SiO_{3}) has not yet reacted with Ca^{2+} ions released from portlandite dissolution, it remains fluid and can easily exude from broken aggregates or through open cracks in the damage concrete structure. This can lead to visible yellow viscous liquid exudations (amber liquid droplets) at the surface of affected concrete.

When pH slowly drops due to the progress of the silica dissolution reaction, the solubility of calcium hydroxide increases, and the alkali gel reacts with Ca^{2+} ions. Its viscosity increases due to gelation process and its mobility (fluidity) strongly decreases when C-S-H phases start to precipitate after reaction with calcium hydroxide (portlandite). At this moment, the calcified gel hardens, hindering therefore the alkali gel transport in concrete.

When the C-S-H gel is exposed to atmospheric carbon dioxide, it undergoes a rapid carbonation, and white or yellow efflorescences appear at the surface of concrete. When the relatively fluid alkali gel continues to exude below the hardened superficial gel layer, it pushes the efflorescences out of the crack surface making them to appear in relief. Because the rates of the gel drying and of the carbonation reactions are faster than the gel exudation velocity (liquid gel expulsion rate through open cracks), in most of the cases, fresh liquid alkali exudates are not frequently encountered at the surface of civil engineering concrete structures. Decompressed concrete cores can sometimes let observe fresh yellow liquid alkali exudations (viscous amber droplets) just after their drilling.

== Mechanism of concrete deterioration ==
The mechanism of ASR causing the deterioration of concrete can thus be described in four steps as follows:

1. The very basic solution (NaOH / KOH) attacks the siliceous aggregates (silicic acid dissolution at high pH), converting the poorly crystallised or amorphous silica to a soluble but very viscous alkali silicate gel (N-S-H, K-S-H).
2. The consumption of NaOH / KOH by the dissolution reaction of amorphous silica decreases the pH of the pore water of the hardened cement paste. This allows the dissolution of Ca(OH)_{2} (portlandite) and increases the concentration of Ca^{2+} ions into the cement pore water. Calcium ions then react with the soluble sodium silicate gel to convert it into solid calcium silicate hydrates (C-S-H). The C-S-H forms a continuous poorly permeable coating at the external surface of the aggregate.
3. The penetrated alkaline solution (NaOH / KOH) converts the remaining siliceous minerals into bulky soluble alkali silicate gel. The resulting expansive pressure increases in the core of the aggregate.
4. The accumulated pressure cracks the aggregate and the surrounding cement paste when the pressure exceeds the tolerance of the aggregate.

== Structural effects of ASR ==
The cracking caused by ASR can have several negative impacts on concrete, including:

1. Expansion: The swelling nature of ASR gel increases the chance of expansion in concrete elements.
2. Compressive strength: The effect of ASR on compressive strength can be minor for low expansion levels, to relatively higher degrees at larger expansion. Swamy and Al-Asali (1986) points out that the compressive strength is not a very accurate parameter to study the severity of ASR; however, the test is done because of its simplicity.
3. Tensile strength / Flexural capacity: Researches show that ASR cracking can significantly reduce the tensile strength of concrete; therefore reducing the flexural capacity of beams. Some research on bridge structures indicate about 85% loss of capacity as a result of ASR.
4. Modulus of elasticity/UPV: The effect of ASR on elastic properties of concrete and ultrasound pulse velocity (UPV) is very similar to tensile capacity. The modulus of elasticity is shown to be more sensitive to ASR than pulse velocity.
5. Fatigue: ASR reduces the load bearing capacity and the fatigue life of concrete.
6. Shear strength: ASR enhances the shear capacity of reinforced concrete with and without shear reinforcement (Ahmed et al., 2000).

== Mitigation ==
ASR can be mitigated in new concrete by several approaches:

1. Limit the alkali metal content of the cement. Many standards impose limits on the "Equivalent Na_{2}O" content of cement.
2. Limit the reactive silica content of the aggregate. Certain volcanic rocks are particularly susceptible to ASR because they contain volcanic glass (obsidian) and should not be used as aggregate. The use of calcium carbonate aggregates can avoid this. In principle, limestone (CaCO_{3}) the level of silica depends on its purity. Some siliceous limestones (a.o., Kieselkalk found in Switzerland) may be cemented by amorphous or poorly crystalline silica and can be very sensitive to the ASR reaction, as also observed with some Tournaisian siliceous limestones exploited in quarries in the area of Tournai in Belgium. The use of limestone as aggregate is not a guarantee against ASR in itself. In Canada, the Spratt siliceous limestone is also particularly well known in studies dealing with ASR and is commonly used as the Canadian ASR reference aggregate.
3. Add very fine siliceous materials to neutralize the excessive alkalinity of cement with silicic acid by a controlled pozzolanic reaction at the early stage of the cement setting. Pozzolanic materials to add to the mix may be, e.g., pozzolan, silica fume, fly ash, or metakaolin. These react preferentially with the cement alkalis without formation of an expansive pressure, because siliceous minerals in fine particles convert to alkali silicate and then to calcium silicate without formation of semipermeable reaction rims.
4. Limit the external alkalis that come in contact with the system.

A prompt reaction initiated at the early stage of concrete hardening on very fine silica particles will help to suppress a slow and delayed reaction with larger siliceous aggregates on the long term. Following the same principle, the fabrication of low-pH cement also implies the addition of finely divided pozzolanic materials rich in silicic acid to the concrete mix to decrease its alkalinity. Beside initially lowering the pH value of the concrete pore water, the main working mechanism of silica fume addition is to consume portlandite (the reservoir of hydroxyde (OH^{–}) in the solid phase) and to decrease the porosity of the hardened cement paste by the formation of calcium silicate hydrates (C-S-H). However, silica fume has to be very finely dispersed in the concrete mix because agglomerated flakes of compacted silica fume can themselves also induce ASR if the dispersion process is insufficient. This can be the case in laboratory studies made on cement pastes alone in the absence of aggregates. Silica fume is sufficiently dispersed during mixing operations of large batches of fresh concrete by the presence of coarse and fine aggregates.

As part of a study conducted by the Federal Highway Administration, a variety of methods have been applied to field structures suffering from ASR-affected expansion and cracking. Some methods, such as the application of silanes, have shown significant promise, especially when applied to elements such as small columns and highway barriers. The topical application of lithium compounds, have shown little or no promise in reducing ASR-induced expansion and cracking.

== Curative treatment ==
There are no curative treatments in general for ASR affected structures. Repair in damaged sections is possible, but the reaction will continue. In some cases, when a sufficient drying of thin components (walls, slabs) of a structure is possible, and is followed by the installation of a watertight membrane, the evolution of the reaction can be slowed down, and sometimes stopped, due to the lack of water needed to continue fueling the reaction. Indeed, water plays a triple role in the alkali-silica reaction: solvent for the reaction taking place, transport medium for the dissolved species reacting, and finally also reagent consumed by the reaction itself.

However, concrete at the center of thick concrete components or structures can never dry because water transport in saturated or unsaturated conditions is always limited by diffusion in the concrete pores (water present under the liquid form, or under the vapor state). The water diffusion time is thus proportional to the square of its transport distance. As a consequence, the water saturation degree inside thick concrete structures often remains higher than 80%, a level sufficient to provide enough water to the system and to maintain the alkali-silica reaction on going.

Massive structures such as dams pose particular problems: they cannot be easily replaced, and the swelling can block spillway gates or turbine operations. Cutting slots across the structure can relieve some pressure, and help restore geometry and function.

== Heavy aggregates for nuclear shielding concrete ==
Two types of heavy aggregates are commonly used for nuclear shielding concrete in order to efficiently absorb gamma-rays: baryte (BaSO_{4}, density = 4.3 – 4.5) and various types of iron oxides, mainly magnetite (Fe_{3}O_{4}, density = 5.2) and hematite (Fe_{2}O_{3}, density = 5.3). The reason is their high density favorable to gamma attenuation. Both types of aggregates need to be checked for ASR as they may contain reactive silica impurities in one form or another.

As elevated temperature in the range of 50 – 80 °C may be reached in the concrete of the primary confinement wall around nuclear reactors, particular attention has to be paid to the selection of aggregates and heavy aggregates to avoid alkali-silica reaction promoted by reactive silica impurities and accelerated by the high temperature to which concrete is exposed.

In some hydrothermal deposits, baryte is associated with silica mineralization and can also contain reactive cristobalite while oxy-hydroxides of Fe(III), in particular ferrihydrite, exhibit a strong affinity for dissolved silica present in water and may constitute an ultimate sink for SiO_{2}.

This explains how microcrystalline silica can progressively accumulate in the mineral gangue of iron oxides.

Dissolved silica (Si(OH)_{4}), and its corresponding silicate anion (SiO(OH)^{−}_{3}), strongly sorbs onto hydrous ferric oxides (HFO) and ferric oxides hydrated surface (>Fe–OH) by ligand exchange:

(HO)_{3}SiO^{−} + >Fe–OH → >Fe–OSi(OH)_{3} + OH^{−}

In this ligand exchange reaction, a silicate anion (also often more simply written as H_{3}SiO^{−}_{4}) is making a nucleophilic substitution onto a >Fe–OH ferrol surface group of HFO and ejects a hydroxide anion OH^{−} while taking its place onto the ferrol group. This mechanism explains the formation of strong inner sphere complexes of silica at the surface of iron oxy-hydroxides and iron oxides. The surface of iron oxides becomes progressively coated with silica and a silica gangue forms at the surface of iron oxide ores. This explains why some iron ores are rich in silica and may therefore be sensitive to the alkali-silica reaction. Very low level of reactive silica in heavy aggregates are sufficient to induce ASR. This is why heavy aggregates must be systematically tested for ASR before nuclear applications such as radiation shielding or immobilization of strongly irradiating radioactive waste.

Another reason of concern for the possible accelerated development of ASR in the concrete of nuclear structures is the progressive amorphization of the silica contained in aggregates exposed to high neutron fluence. This process is also known as metamictization and is known to create amorphous halos in minerals like zircon rich in uranium and thorium when their crystal structure is submitted to intense alpha-particles internal bombardment and becomes amorph (metamict state).

The loss of mechanical properties of heavily neutron-irradiated concrete component such as the biological shield of a reactor at the end of the service life of a nuclear power plant is expected to be due to radiation-induced swelling of aggregates, which leads to volumetric expansion of the concrete.

== Prevention of the risk ==
The only way to prevent, or to limit, the risk of ASR is to avoid one or several of the three elements in the critical triangle aggregate reactivity – cement alkali content – water:

- by selecting non-reactive aggregates after testing them according to an appropriate standard test method (see next section);
- by using a low-alkali (LA) cement: with a maximum alkali content expressed in Na_{2}O_{eq} < 0.60% of the cement mass, according to EN 197-1 European standard for cement, or by limiting the total alkali content in concrete (e.g., less than 3 kg Na_{2}O_{eq}/m^{3} of concrete for a CEM I cement (OPC)). Example of standard for concrete in Belgium: NBN EN 206 and its national supplement NBN B 15-001;
- by limiting the contact of underground or meteoritic water infiltrations with the concrete structure (water tight membrane, roofing, sufficient water drainage, ...). This last precaution is always advisable when possible and the only one also sometimes applicable for existing ASR-affected concrete structures.

== Methods for testing potential alkali reactivity ==
ASTM International has developed different standardized test methods for screening aggregates for their susceptibility to ASR:

- ASTM C227: "Test Method for Potential Alkali Reactivity of Cement-Aggregate Combinations (Mortar-Bar Method)" Round Mortar Bar Container
- ASTM C289: "Standard Test Method for Potential Alkali-Silica Reactivity of Aggregates (Chemical Method)" Alkali Reaction Container
- ASTM C295: "Guide for Petrographic Examination of Aggregate for Concrete"
- ASTM C1260: "Test Method for Potential Reactivity of Aggregates (Mortar-Bar-Test)". It is a rapid test of aggregates: immersion of mortar bars in NaOH 1 M at 80 °C for 14 days used to quickly identify highly reactive aggregates or quasi non-reactive aggregates. Beside an elevated temperature, the C1260 method also involves the use of a large quantity/inventory of NaOH in the solution in which the mortar bar is immersed. A large pool of OH^{–} anions is thus available to diffuse inside the mortar bar to dissolve silica present in aggregates. Consequently, this test is very severe and may exclude valuable aggregates. In case of non-decisive results, the long-term ASTM C1293 test method has to be used for a final screening. The main advantage of the ASTM C1260 test is that it allows to quickly identify extreme cases: very insensitive or very reactive aggregates.
- ASTM C1293: "Test Method for Concrete Aggregates by Determination of Length Change of Concrete Due to Alkali-Silica Reaction". It is a long-term confirmation test (1 or 2 years) at 38 °C in a water-saturated moist atmosphere (inside a thermostated oven) with concrete prisms containing the aggregates to be characterised mixed with a high-alkali cement specially selected to induce ASR. The concrete prisms are not directly immersed in an alkaline solution, but wrapped with moist tissues and tightly packed inside a water-tight plastic foils.
- ASTM C1567: "Standard Test Method for Determining the Potential Alkali-Silica Reactivity of Combinations of Cementitious Materials and Aggregate (Accelerated Mortar-Bar Method)"

Other concrete prism methods have also been internationally developed to detect potential alkali-reactivity of aggregates or sometimes hardened concrete cores, e.g.:

- The Oberholster method on which the ASTM C1260 test is based. It is a severe short duration test with immersion of the mortar prism or concrete core in a solution of NaOH 1 M at 80 °C for 14 days.
- The Duggan method starts with a first immersion of several concrete cores in distilled water at 22 °C for rehydration during 3 days. It is then followed by heating for one day in a dry oven at 82 °C and then with a succession of cycles of one day hydration followed by one day drying at 82 °C. The expansion of the concrete cores is measured till 14 or 20 days. It is a short duration test for ASR/AAR but much softer than the Oberholster test. It can also be used to measure the expansion of concrete due to delayed ettringite formation (DEF). The mechanical stresses induced by the thermal cycles create micro-cracks in the concrete matrix and so facilitate the accessibility to water of the reactive mineral phases in the treated samples.
- The concrete microbar test was proposed by Grattan-Bellew et al. (2003) as a universal accelerated test for alkali-aggregate reaction.
- CSA A23.1-14A and CSA A23.2-14A: Canadian CSA standard concrete prism tests for potential expansivity of cement/aggregate combinations. CSA A23.2-14A is a long-term test in which concrete prisms are stored under saturated moist conditions at a temperature of 38 °C, for a minimum of 365 days. It is the Canadian standard equivalent to ASTM C1293.
- LCPC/IFSTTAR (1997) LPC-44. Alkali reaction in concrete. Residual expansion tests on hardened concrete.
- RILEM AAR-3 concrete prism method (storage at 38 °C).
- RILEM AAR-4 concrete prism method (storage at 60 °C).
- RILEM AAR-4 alternative method (storage at 60 °C).
- German concrete test method (storage at 40 °C).
- Norwegian concrete prism method (storage at 38 °C).

== Known affected structures ==
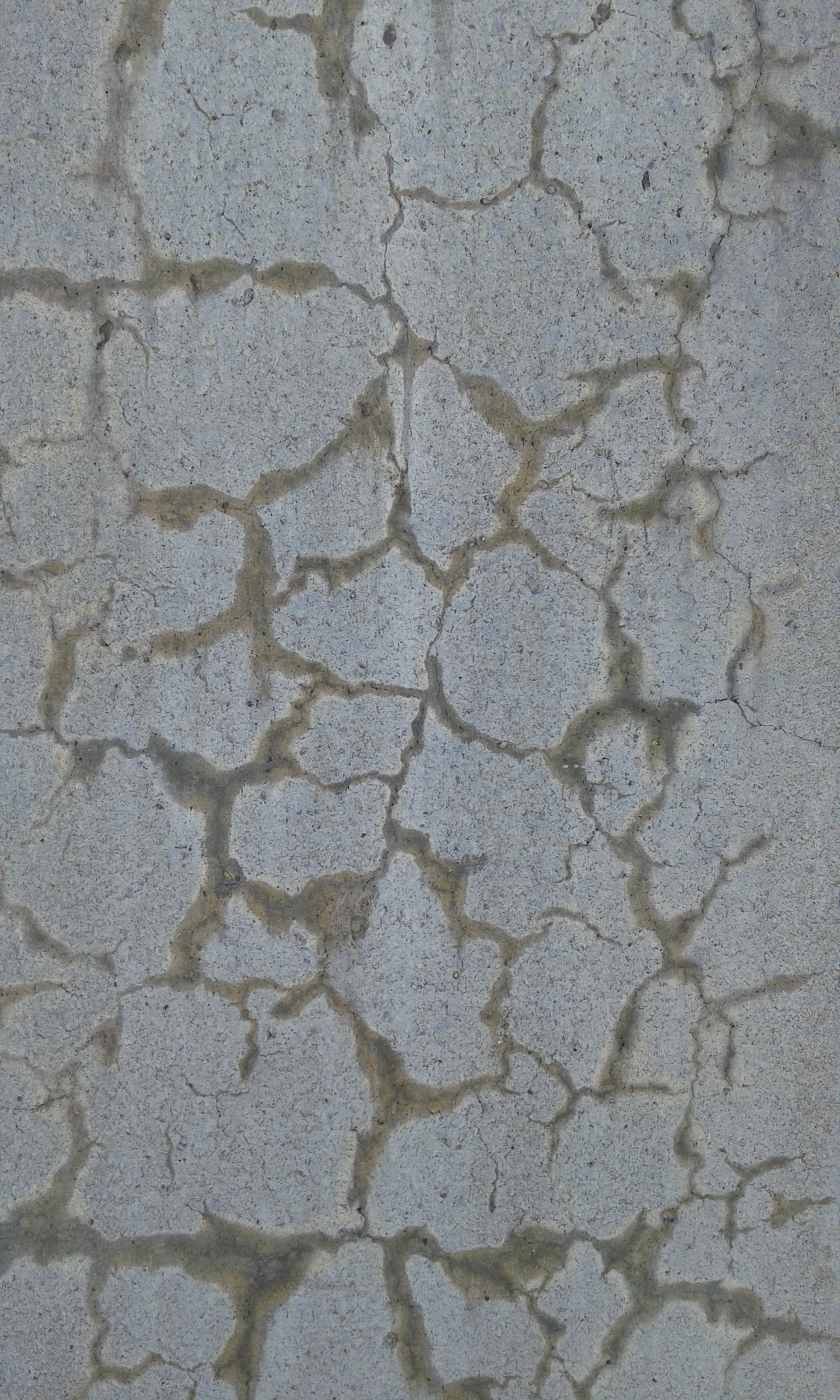
Surface of a concrete pillar of the building of the National Gallery of Canada at Ottawa presenting the typical crack pattern of the alkali-silica reaction (ASR). Note the typical fatty aspect of the yellow silicagel exudations imbibing the concrete surface along the two sides of the cracks.

=== Australia ===
- Adelaide Festival Centre car park, demolished in 2017
- Centennial Hall, Adelaide (1936–2007)
- Dee Why ocean pool, Dee Why, New South Wales.
- King St Bridge, demolished and replaced in 2011 (crossing the Patawalonga River, Glenelg North, South Australia).
- Manly Surf Pavilion, Manly, New South Wales (1939–1981).
- The MCG's old Southern Stand, demolished in 1990 and replaced with the Great Southern Stand which was completed in 1992
- Westpoint Blacktown car park

=== Belgium ===
- Many bridges and civil engineering works of motorways because the improper use of highly reactive siliceous Tournaisian limestone (lower carboniferous Dinantian) during the years 1960 – 1970 when most of the motorways were constructed in Belgium. ASR damages started to be recognised only in the 1980s. The Tournaisian limestone may contain up to 25–30 wt. % of reactive biogenic silica originating from the spicules of siliceous sponges deposited with calcium carbonate in the marine sediments.
- Pommeroeul lock in Hainaut on the canal Hensies – Pommeroeul – Condé.
- Tour & Taxis car access ramp in Brussels with liquid exudations of amber alkali gel evidenced on concrete cores by SPW experts (Public Services of Wallonia).
- External containment building of the Tihange 2 nuclear power plant.
- Poorly conditioned radioactive waste from the Doel nuclear power plant: evaporator concentrates and spent ion-exchange resins (SIER) exuding out of the concrete immobilization matrix very large quantities of liquid sodium silicagel (mainly N-S-H).

=== Canada ===
Alkali-aggregate reactions (AAR), both alkali-silica (ASR) and alkali-carbonate (ACR, involving dolomite) reactions, were identified in Canada since the years 1950s.

- Many hydraulic dams are affected by ASR in Canada because of the wide use of reactive aggregates. Indeed, reactive frost-sensitive chert is very often found in glacio-fluvial environments from which gravels are commonly extracted in Canada. Another reason is also the presence of reactive silica in Paleozoic limestones like the siliceous Ordovician limestone (Bobcaygeon Formation) from the Spratt's quarry near Ottawa in Ontario. The Spratt's limestone aggregates (from the company "Spratt Sand and Gravel Limited") are widely used for ASR studies in Canada and worldwide as described by Rogers et al. (2000) and also recommended by RILEM (International Union of Laboratories and Experts in Construction Materials, Systems, and Structures).
- Many bridges and civil engineering works of motorways.
- Interchange Robert Bourassa – Charest (Québec city: interchange autoroutes 740 – 440) demolished in 2010.
- Gentilly 2 nuclear power plant.
- Building of the National Gallery of Canada at Ottawa.
- Mactaquac Dam

=== France ===
- Former Térénez bridge in Brittany, built in 1951 and replaced in 2011.

=== Germany ===
- East German Deutsche Reichsbahn used numerous concrete ties in the 1970s to replace previous wooden ties. However, the gravel from the Baltic Sea caused ASR and the ties had to be replaced earlier than planned, lasting well into the 1990s.
- After reunification, many Autobahns in East Germany were refurbished with concrete that turned out to have been defective and affected by ASR, necessitating expensive replacement work.

=== New Zealand ===
- Fairfield Bridge in Hamilton, New Zealand. Repaired in 1991 at a cost of NZ$1.1 million.

=== United Kingdom ===
- Keybridge House, South Lambeth Road, Vauxhall, London, England.
- Millennium Stadium North Stand (part of the old National Stadium), Cardiff, Wales.
- Merafield Bridge, A38, England. Demolished manually in 2016.
- Pebble Mill Studios, Birmingham. Demolished in 2005
- Royal Devon and Exeter Hospital, Wonford. Demolished and replaced in the mid-1990s.
- Steve Bull Stand, Molineux Stadium, Wolverhampton

=== United States ===
- Chickamauga Dam in Tennessee.
- Fontana Dam in Tennessee.
- Kauffman Stadium in Missouri.
- Seabrook Station Nuclear Power Plant in Seabrook, New Hampshire.
- Seminoe Dam in Wyoming.
- Sixth Street Viaduct in Los Angeles. Demolished in 2016.

=== Zambia and Zimbabwe ===
- Kariba Dam

== See also ==
- Alkali-carbonate reaction
- Alkali–aggregate reaction
- Calthemite: Secondary calcium carbonate deposit growing under man-made structures
- Carbonatation
- Colloidal silica
- Construction aggregate
- Cracking pattern
- Crocodile cracking: distress in asphalt pavement characterized by interconnecting or interlaced cracking in the asphalt layer
- Energetically modified cement (EMC)
- Gyrolite, a product of slag hydration and ASR gel ageing
- Hydrated silica
- Pozzolanic reaction
- Silicate: see solid SiO_{2} hydrolysis/dissolution and Si–OH deprotonation reactions at high pH
- Siliceous sponge
- Soda lime: the mechanism of ASR catalysed by NaOH is analogous to the trapping mechanism of CO_{2} by Ca(OH)_{2} impregnated with NaOH
