= Trass =

Trass is the local name of a tuff (rock from volcanic ash) occurring in the Eifel mountains of northwestern Europe, where it is worked for hydraulic mortar. It is a grey or cream-coloured fragmental rock, largely composed of pumiceous dust, and may be regarded as a trachytic tuff. It much resembles the Italian pozzolana and is applied to like purposes. Mixed with lime and sand, or with Portland cement, it is extensively employed for hydraulic work, especially in the Netherlands; while the compact varieties have been used as a building material and as a fire-stone in ovens. Trass was formerly worked extensively in the Brohl valley and is now obtained from the valley of the Nette, near Andernach.

== See also ==
- Pozzolan
- Pozzolana
- Pozzolanic reaction
- Pumice
