= Denticulate tool =

Type of stone tool

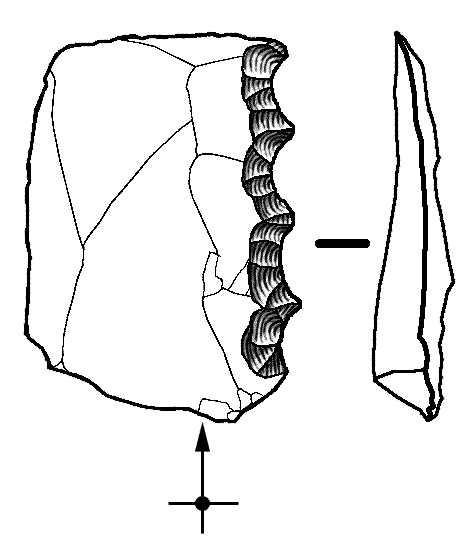
Drawing of tool with denticulate retouch

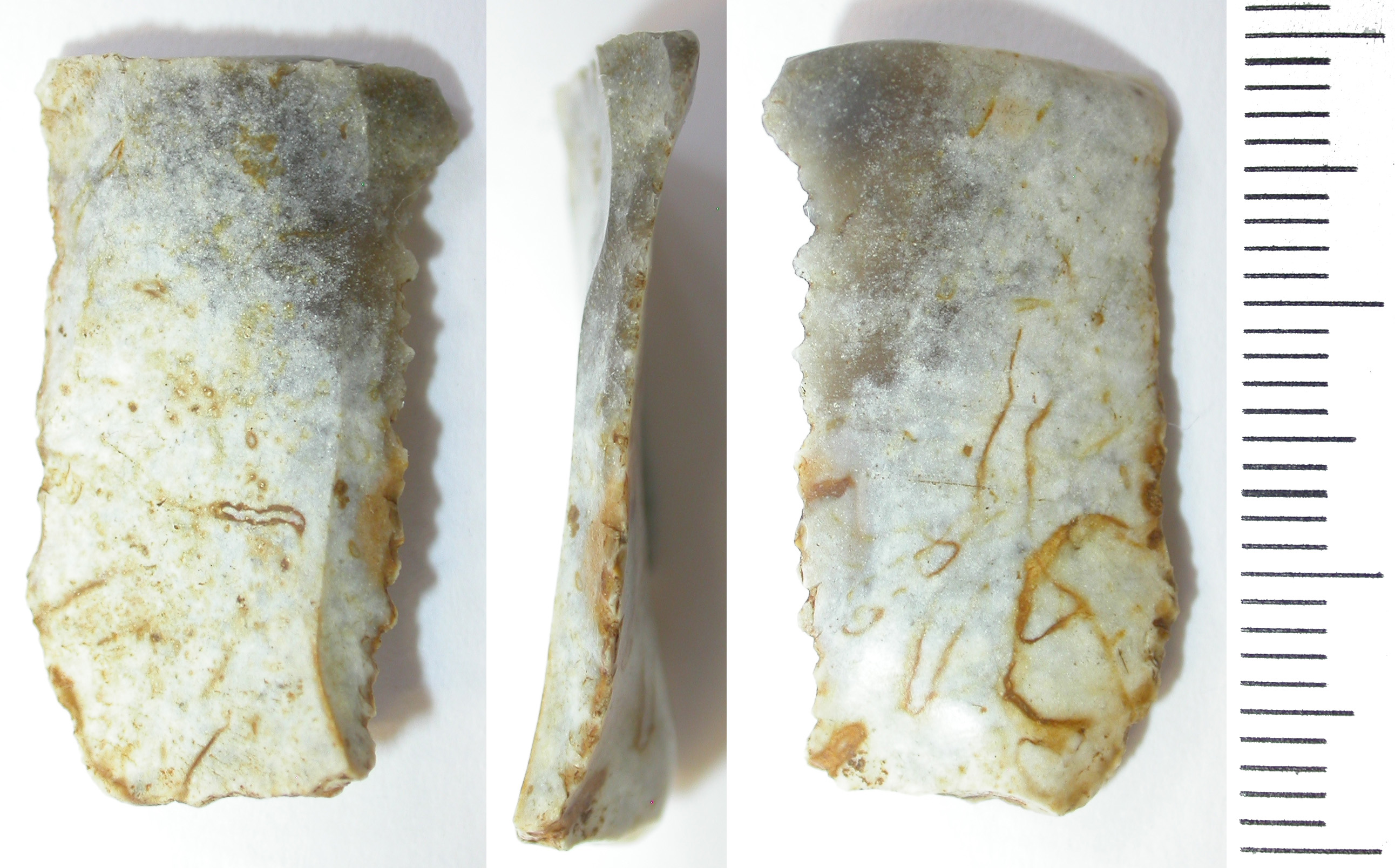
Denticulate tool from the Mesolithic period with a clear serrated edge

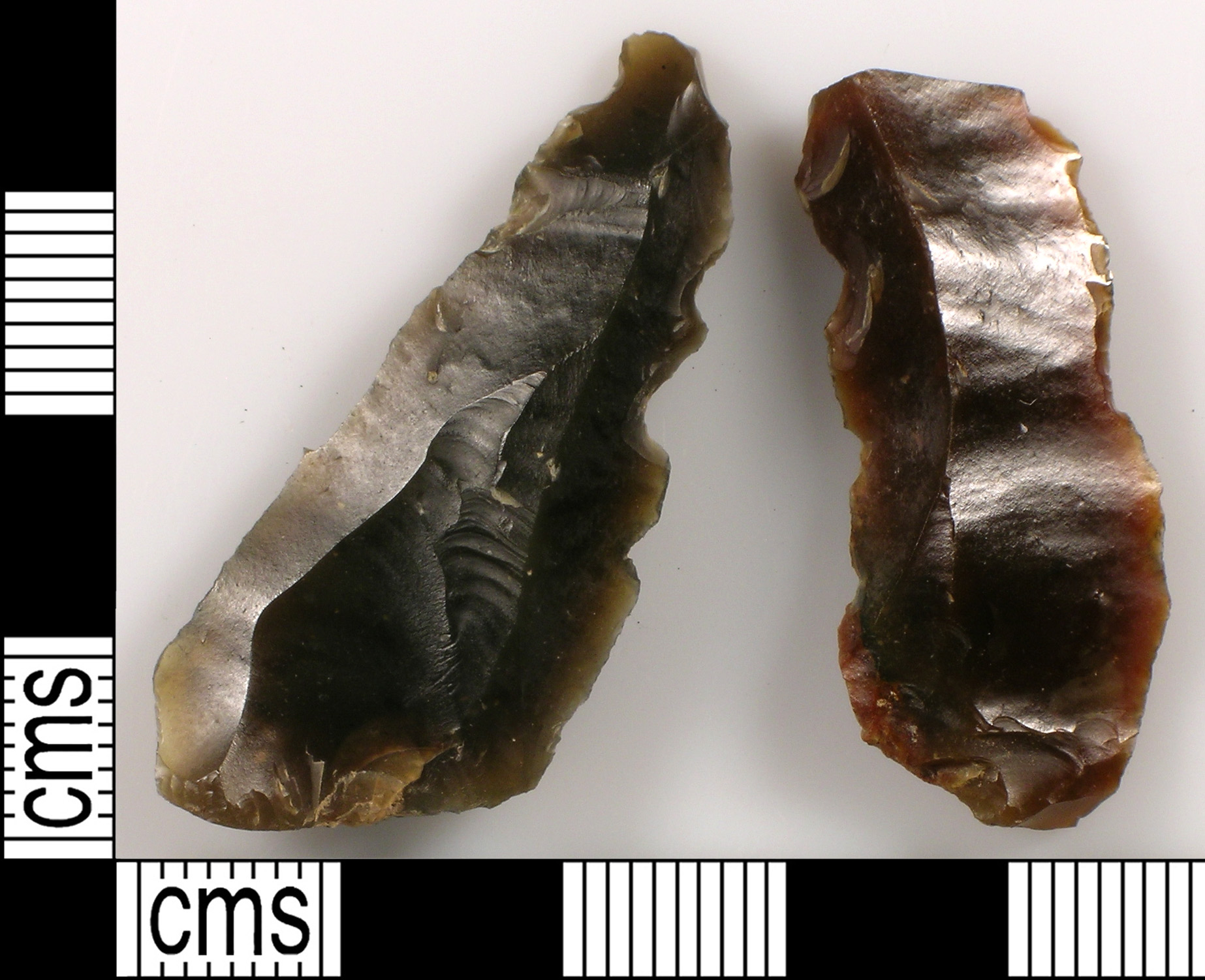
Two denticulate tools with large notches

In archaeology, a denticulate tool is a stone tool containing one or more edges that are worked into multiple notched shapes (or teeth), much like the toothed edge of a saw. Such tools have been used as saws for woodworking, processing meat and hides, craft activities and for agricultural purposes. Denticulate tools were used by many different groups worldwide and have been found at a number of notable archaeological sites. They can be made from a number of different lithic materials, but a large number of denticulate tools are made from flint.

Due to the nature of denticulate tools they can be difficult to classify, this leads to what is known as a 'typology dilemma'. It can be difficult for archaeologists to sort and classify these tools because it is impossible for them to know if the notches were created intentionally, or if they are a result of unintentional damage. Incorrectly classifying items found at archaeological sites is problematic because it can have a significant impact on how the tools and the site are interpreted by archaeologists.

These tools are included in the Mousterian tool industry by Neanderthal culture, proceeded by small hand axes and side scrapers.

== Uses ==
Denticulate tools have many different uses which can differ based on the material, size and shape of the tool. The tools can be used for woodworking, processing meat and hides, craft activities and agricultural purposes.

=== Woodworking ===
Experiments carried out by archaeologists found that using denticulate tools "seem to provide more control when working wood than a raw flake or even a scraper might", because they hold their position well on the wood because of the notches. Shaped wooden artefacts have been found uncovered at sites alongside denticulate tools, suggesting these tools were used to shape these items. If denticulate tools are examined under a microscope and traces of use wear may suggest they were used to scrape wood, for example if the edges are more polished and uniform.

=== Meat and hide processing ===
There is evidence which suggests denticulate tools were also used on softer surfaces such as meat and hides. Use-wear analysis carried out on denticulate tools at sites in Spain and Italy suggests that they were "employed in hide-working and butchery activities" The sort of polish on the notches of a denticulate tool can also indicate it was used to scrape hides or skin.

=== Craft activities ===
Evidence shows that denticulate tools were used by Palaeolithic craftsmen. Some denticulate tools found in Spain have characteristics which suggest they were used for craft activities, in particular, crafts that required careful and precise action or work on small items such as needles or handles.

=== Agriculture ===
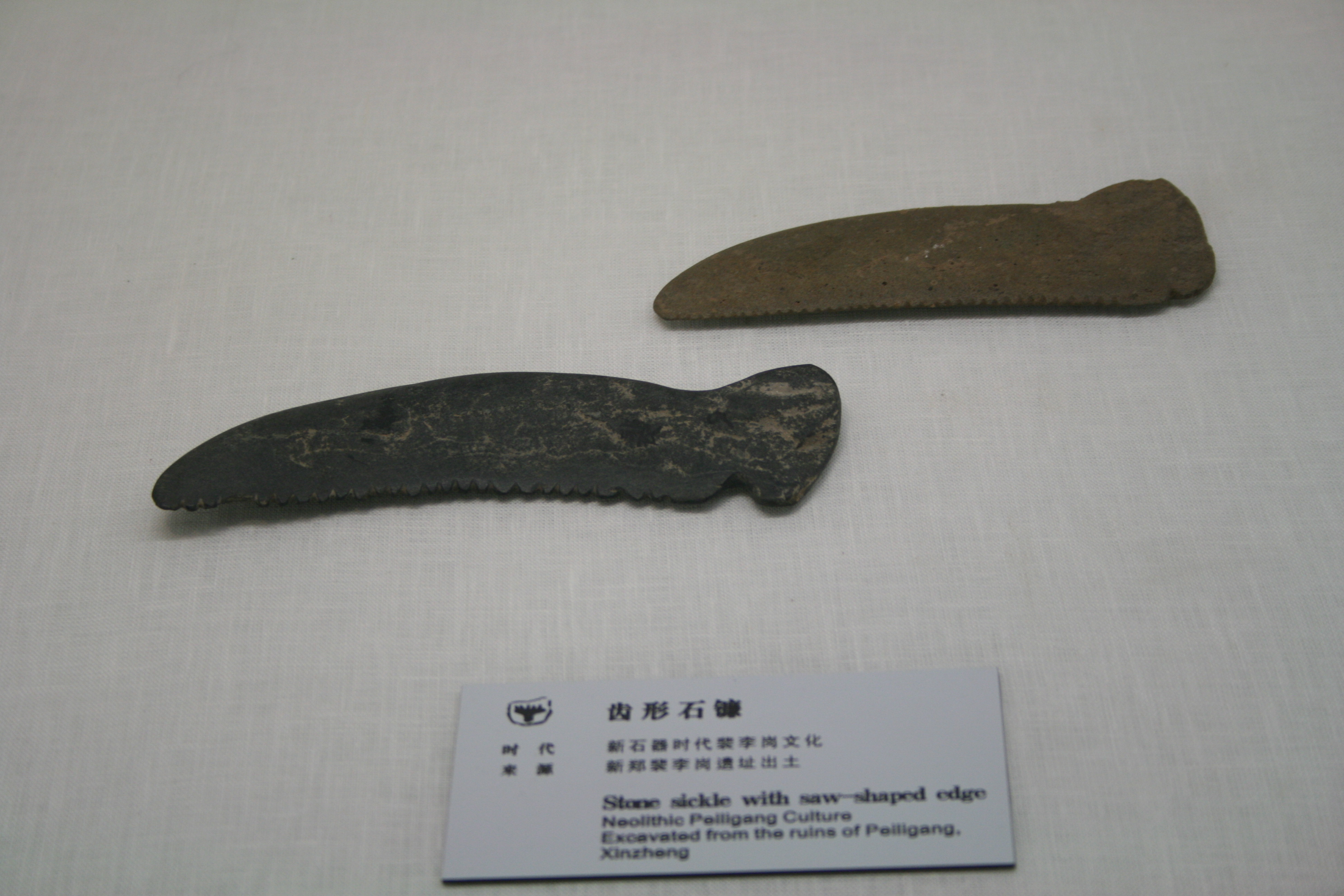
Example of a 'denticulate sickle' found at Peiligang site in China

Researchers in China have examined denticulate tools found at Peiligang sites which show signs they were used for agricultural purposes, these specific tools are referred to as 'denticulate sickles'. Denticulate sickles are characterised by a denticulated cutting edge with grooves carved into it and a concave back opposite to grooves, one end of the tool is pointed and the other has a notch where a wooden handle may have once been connected. These tools can range in size from 10 to 20 cm and are made from soft lithic materials. Usewear analysis of these tools suggests they were used for harvesting cereals, cutting grass and reeds and stripping fruits and nuts from branches. However, findings concluded that "denticulate sickles were multi-purpose tools, rather than specialised implements for harvesting cereals."

There is also evidence that denticulate tools were used to carry out what is known as 'plant splitting', which involves using a tool and a specific and hand movement ("twist-of-the-wrist") to split bamboo shoots and reeds or to remove bark from trees Archaeologists have also theorised that it was the process plant splitting itself that created the notches on the denticulate tools, rather intentional retouch.

== Distribution ==
Denticulate tools have a wide distribution and have been found in many places around the world, including Europe, Asia and Africa.

=== Notable Sites ===
Denticulate tools have been found at a number of notable archaeological sites around the world, include Pech de l'Aze IV and Payre in France, the El Collado site and el Miron Cave in Spain, Jiahu, Shigu and Egou in China and the Tabon Caves in the Philippines.

==== Pech de l'Azé IV ====
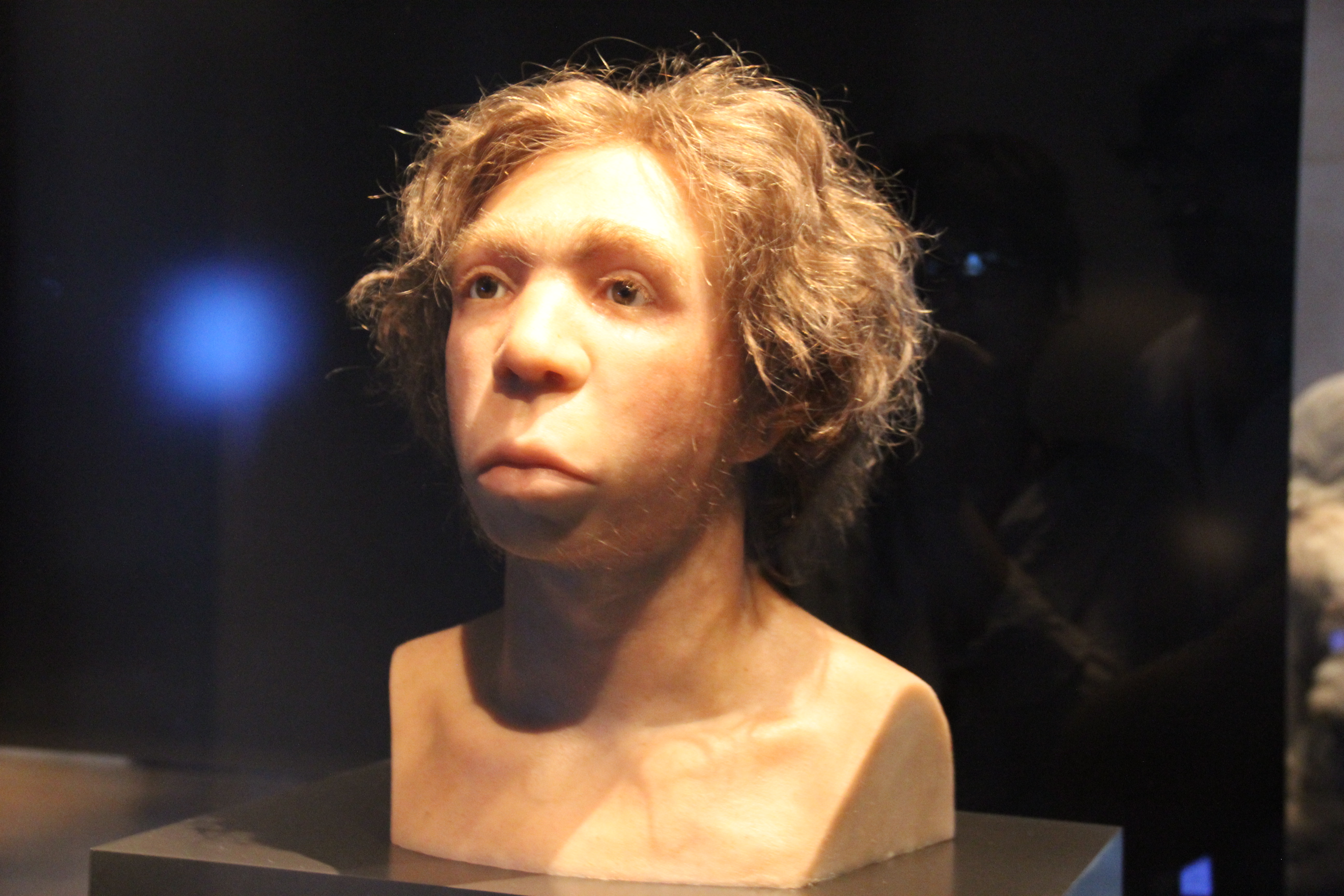
Reconstruction of a Neanderthal skull - these are the people who would have been using the denticulate tools found at the European sites

Pech de l'Azé IV is an archaeological site located in the south of France which was the home to Neanderthals during the Ice Age, 90,000-30,000 BCE. Over 20,000 lithic tools were found at the site during the most recent excavations, including 43 denticulate tools, which for the purpose of this excavation were classified as "types which have two or more adjacent notches". Some of the denticulate tools found at this site were made from very thin flakes and had complex notches resembling saws, which were most likely used for woodworking and for the processing of meat and hides. Francois Bordes, an archaeologist whose work focused on the typology of lithic tools, was involved in excavations at this site.

==== Payre ====
Payre is site located in Southeast France, by the Rhone River and human remains excavated at the site reveal that it was home to humans of the Neanderthal lineage. Researchers identified a number of stone tools at the site, which included 49 denticulates, made from either flint or quartz. Researchers found that out of all the types of stone tools found at the site, the denticulate tools were made from the largest and thickest flakes.

==== El Collado ====
El Collado is a Mesolithic funerary site in Spain where a number of denticulate tools were found. Analysis of these tools indicates that they were used in craft activities that involved working with wood and bone. The denticulate tools found at this site were mainly made from flint.

==== el Mirón Cave ====
The el Mirón Cave in Spain is another site with an abundant lithic artefact assemblage, which includes denticulate tools, which are assumed to have been used as domestic tools. However, denticulate tools only made up a small number of the lithic tools found at this site. The lithic tools found at this site were made from local non-flint materials and non-local flint materials.

==== Jiahu, Shigu and Egou ====
Jiahu, Shigu and Egou are Peiligang sites in China where denticulate tools have been found. The tools range from 10 to 20 cm in length and were most likely used for agricultural purposes. Denticulate tools found at these sites vary in shape “from a narrow body with a sharp-angled tip to a wide body with a more obtuse angled tip” and most have worn down teeth, indicating heavy usage.

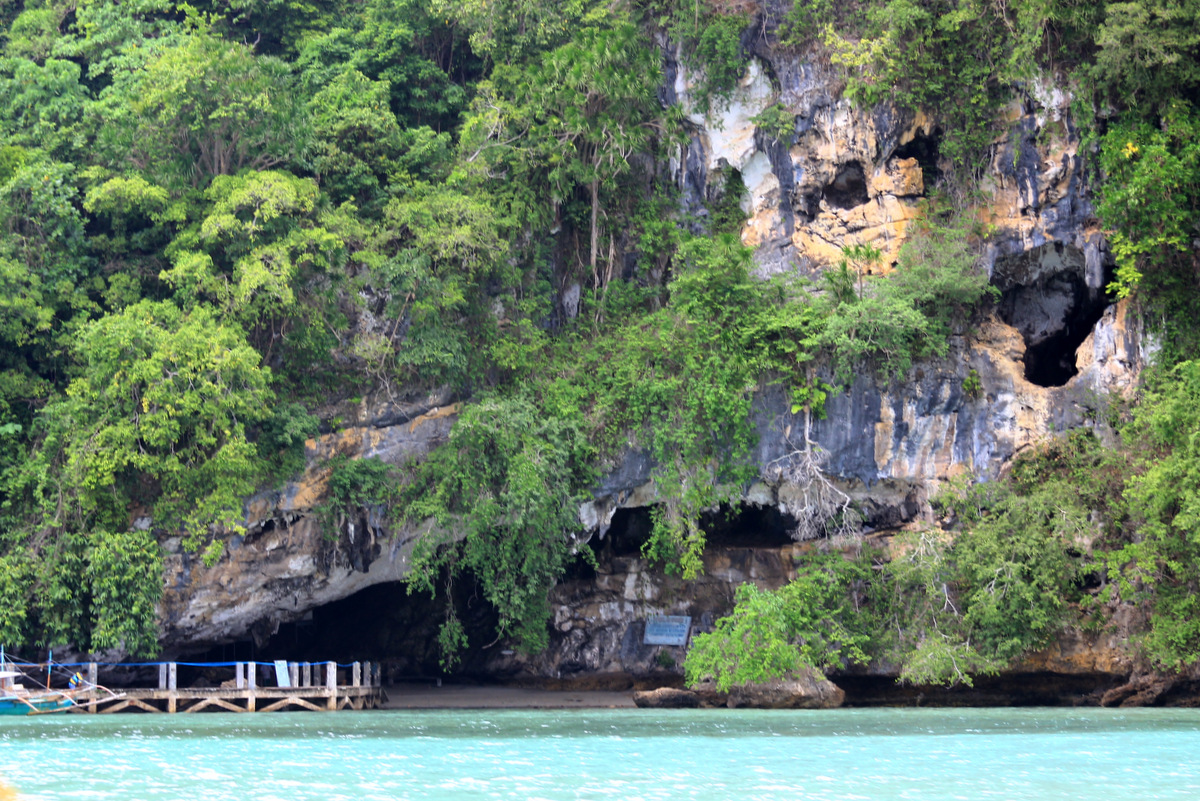
Tabon Caves in the Philippines, where a number of denticulate tools were found

==== Tabon Caves ====
41 denticulate tools were found in the Tabon Caves in the Philippines, which are thought to have been used for ‘plant splitting’. Some of tools found show evidence of intentional retouching while other denticulate tools may have been formed unintentionally.

=== Other ===
==== Egypt ====
A large proportion of the denticulate tools in the Metropolitan Museum of Art's collection come from different areas in Egypt. In ancient Egypt flint denticulate tools adhered to wooden handles were used to reap grain from the 5th to 4th millennia BC.

==== England ====
Denticulate tools have also been found in England, in the Robin Hood Cave and in Etton, Cambridgeshire

== Raw Materials ==
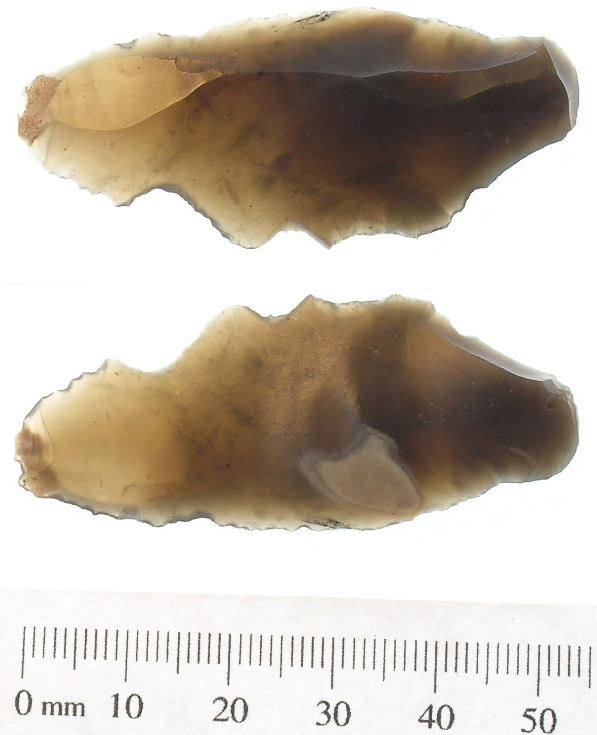
A denticulate tool made from flint

Denticulate tools are usually made from flint, but can also be made from other materials such as limestone and quartz.

The availability and quality of the raw materials used to create denticulate tools is heavily influenced by the geographic area and analysis of raw materials and where they come from can provide information about the travel and trading habits of the inhabitants of the ancient sites.

Researchers at Pech de l'Azé IV identified denticulate tools made from different types of flint, including Coniacian flint, Campanian flint and Bergerac flint. At Pech de l'Azé IV 95% of lithic tools found were made from local raw materials and a small number of tools were made from exotic raw materials such as chalcedony. At Payre 47 of the denticulate tools found were made from flint and 4 were made from quartz.

Denticulate tools found at the Peiligang sites were made from a number of different raw materials including; tuff, sandstone, siltstone, mudstone, slate and siliceous limestone. These are softer lithic materials that allow for easier manufacture through filing and grinding.

Denticulate tools found at the Tabon Caves in the Philippines were made from red jasper, white chert and andesite.

The tools found at the el Mirón Cave were made from local non-flint materials and non-local flint materials.

== Typology Dilemma ==
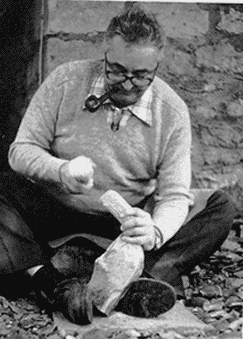
Francois Bordes - key figure in typology of lithic tools

Denticulate tools have been proven to be relevant enough in the Mousterian tool industry to have been identified as a specific tool type in Typologie du Paléolithique ancien et moyen 1961, written by French archaeologist and geologist Francois Bordes. Many archaeologists use Bordes' typology when classifying lithic tools but this can prove difficult, especially “when too many questionable pieces appeared in an assemblage”. Even Bordes himself found it difficult when attempting to classify denticulate tools within his typology.

It is sometimes hard for typologists to tell whether lithic artefacts were retouched intentionally or unintentionally, for example as a result of wear over time or human trampling. The question then becomes:

“should the term denticulates be restricted to tools intentionally retouched or encompass all tools with adjacent notches whatever the origin of the latter is?”

It is important that lithic tools are accurately classified because the way these tools are sorted can impact how they are interpreted. Lithic tools can provide important information on the social and economic realities of the lives of the ancient people who were using them, so archaeologists must take care when attempting to classify them.

Archaeologists have run tests to see whether the human trampling of stone flakes can damage the edges of the flakes in a way that appears to be deliberate retouch. Flakes of chert and obsidian were used in the experiment, they were placed in substrate and then the archaeologists walked over the substrate and finally excavated the flakes. This experiment created what the archaeologists referred to as 'pseudo-tools', which resemble deliberately retouched Palaeolithic formal tools so closely that they would be classified as such. The archaeologists who carried out this study warn that, when working with denticulate tools "any typological analysis and conclusions about economic activities, social organisation, or cultural affinities must be made with caution"

The typology dilemma can also occur as a result of excavator bias, which impacts the way artefacts are classified and sorted and can distort the interpretation of the uncovered collection. Sometimes artefacts are thrown away because they are not recognised as artefacts at all, for example, an early excavator at the site of site of Combe-Capelle Bas discarded all the denticulate tools because they did not recognise them as 'valid tool types'. As a result, the collection was dominated by scrapers and did not accurately reflect the range of tools used at the site.

=== Types of Denticulate tools ===
Within the category of denticulate tools, there are further classifications that can be used when examining or studying the tools. Three different types have been distinguished based on the length of the notches on the cutting edge. Theodoropoulou, Moncel and Navarro (2009) describe the different types as follows:

- macrodenticulates: with notches with lengths of more than 5mm
- microdenticulates: with notches with lengths of less than 5mm the length of notches is smaller than 5 mm
- festooned denticulates: with notches with lengths of more or less than 5mm the length of notches varies

The degree of modification of denticulate tools also can also be used to classify them further – with modification being considered either as small, average or invasive.
