= Soda lime =

Chemical mixture for absorbing carbon dioxide

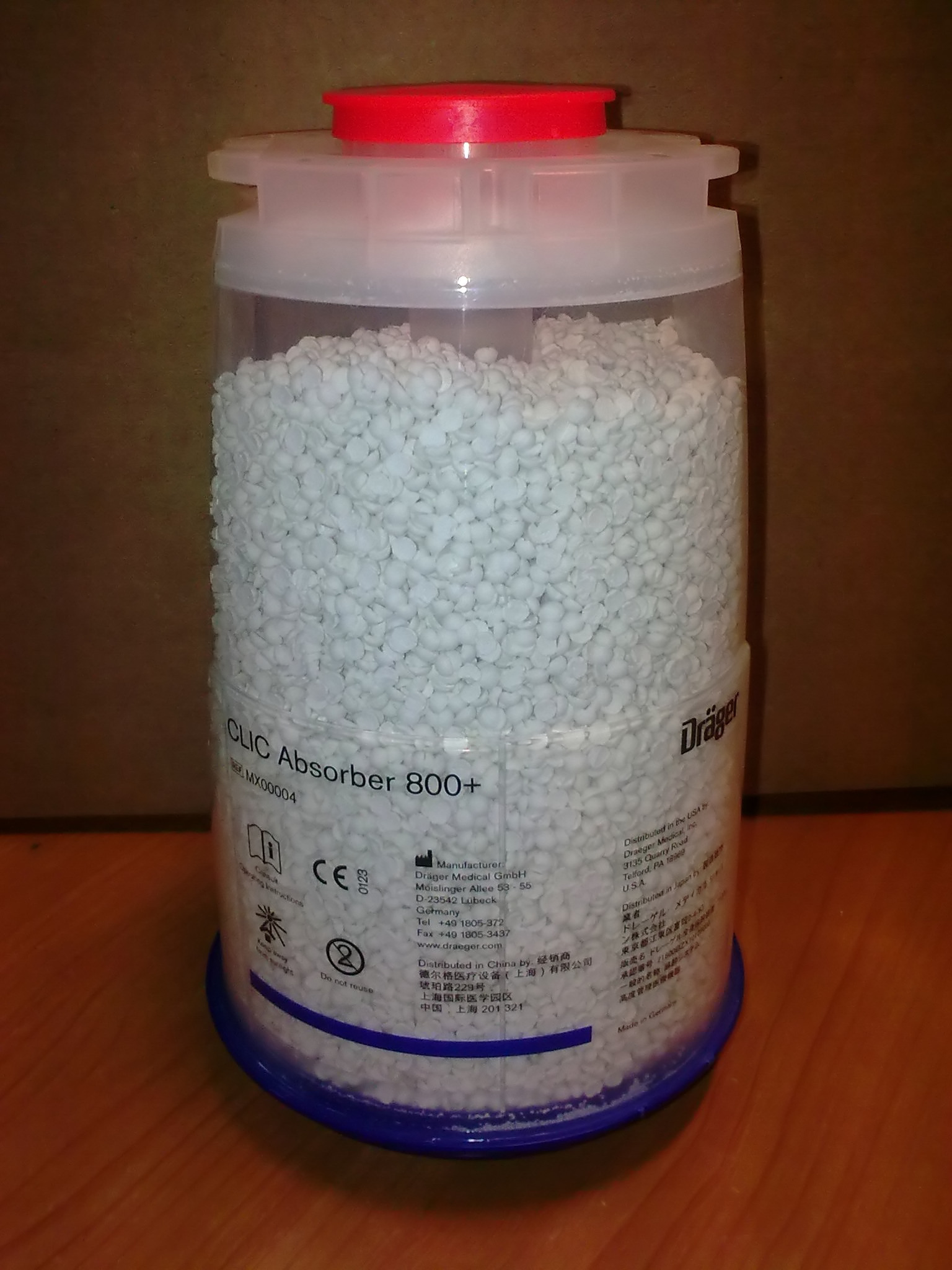
Soda lime canister used in anaesthetic machines to act as a carbon dioxide scrubber

Soda lime is a mixture of sodium hydroxide (NaOH) and calcium oxide (CaO). It is used in granular form within recirculating breathing environments like general anesthesia and its breathing circuit, submarines, rebreathers, and hyperbaric chambers and underwater habitats. Its purpose is to eliminate carbon dioxide (CO_{2}) from breathing gases, preventing carbon dioxide retention and, eventually, carbon dioxide poisoning. The creation of soda lime involves treating slaked lime with a concentrated sodium hydroxide solution.

== Chemical components ==
The primary components of soda lime include: calcium oxide (CaO) constituting approximately 75%, water (H_{2}O) accounting for around 20%, sodium hydroxide (NaOH) making up about 3%, and potassium hydroxide (KOH) present at approximately 0.1%.

== Anesthesia ==
During general anesthesia, a patient's exhaled gases, containing carbon dioxide, pass through an anaesthesia machine's breathing circuit, containing a soda lime canister filled with soda lime granules. Medical-grade soda lime includes an indicating dye that changes color when it reaches its carbon dioxide absorption capacity. To ensure proper functioning, a carbon dioxide scrubber (or soda lime canister) should not be used if the indicating dye is activated. Standard anesthesia machines typically contain up to 2 kilograms (4.4 lb) of soda lime granules.

Recent carbon dioxide absorbents have been developed to minimize the risk of toxic by-product formation resulting from the interaction between the absorbent and inhaled anesthetics, like halothane. Some absorbents, including those made from lithium hydroxide, are available for this purpose.

== Space flight ==
In space flights, lithium hydroxide (LiOH) is used as a carbon dioxide absorbent due to its low molecular weight (Na: 23 g/mol; Li: 7 g/mol), saving weight during launch. During the Apollo 13 flight, high carbon dioxide levels in the Lunar Module led the crew to adapt spare absorbent cartridges from the Apollo capsule to the Lunar Excursion Module (LEM) system.

== Rebreather use ==
Exhaled gas in a breathing circuit must pass through a carbon dioxide scrubber where carbon dioxide is absorbed before the gas is circulated for breathing again. In rebreathers, this scrubber is integrated into the breathing loop. However, in larger settings like recompression chambers or submarines, a fan is employed to ensure a continuous flow of gas through the scrubbing canister. The use of indicating dye in United States Navy fleet applications ceased in 1996 due to concerns about potential chemical releases into the circuit.

== Chemical reaction ==
The overall chemical reaction is:

CO_{2} + Ca(OH)_{2} → CaCO_{3} + H_{2}O + heat (in the presence of water)

Each mole of CO_{2} (44 g) reacts with one mole of calcium hydroxide (74 g) and produces one mole of water (18 g).

The reaction can be considered as a strong-base-catalysed, water-facilitated reaction.

The reaction mechanism of carbon dioxide with soda lime can be decomposed in three elementary steps:

1) $\ce{CO2(g) <=>> CO2(aq)}$ (CO_{2} dissolves in water – slow and rate-determining),

2) $\ce{CO2(aq) + NaOH -> NaHCO3}$ (bicarbonate formation at high pH),

3) $\ce{NaHCO3 + Ca(OH)2 -> CaCO3 + NaOH + H2O}$ (NaOH recycled to step 2 – hence a catalyst).

This sequence of reactions explains the catalytic role played by sodium hydroxide in the system and why soda lime is faster in chemical reactivity than calcium hydroxide alone. The moist sodium hydroxide impregnates the surface and the porosity of calcium hydroxide grains with a high specific surface area. It reacts much more quickly and so contributes to a faster elimination of the carbon dioxide from the rebreathing circuit. The formation of water by the reaction and the moisture from the respiration also act as a solvent for the reaction. Reactions in aqueous phase are generally faster than between a dry gas and a dry solid. Soda lime is commonly used in closed-circuit diving rebreathers and in the anesthesia breathing circuit in anesthesia systems.

The same catalytic effect by the alkali hydroxides (function of the Na_{2}O_{eq} content of cement) also contributes to the carbonation of portlandite by atmospheric CO_{2} in concrete although the rate of propagation of the reaction front is there essentially limited by the carbon dioxide diffusion within the concrete matrix less porous.

== Analogy with the alkali–silica reaction ==
A similar reaction to above, also catalysed by sodium hydroxide, is the alkali–silica reaction, a slow degradation process causing the swelling and the cracking of concrete containing aggregates rich in reactive amorphous silica. In a very similar way, sodium hydroxide greatly facilitates the dissolution of the amorphous silica. The produced sodium silicate then reacts with the calcium hydroxide (portlandite) present in the hardened cement paste to form calcium silicate hydrate (abbreviated as C-S-H in the cement chemist notation). This silicification reaction of calcium hydroxide on its turn continuously releases again sodium hydroxide in solution, maintaining a high pH, and the cycle continues up to the total disappearance of portlandite or reactive silica in the exposed concrete. Without the catalysis of this reaction by sodium- or potassium-soluble hydroxides, the alkali–silica reaction would not proceed or would be limited to a very slow pozzolanic reaction. The alkali–silica reaction can be written like the soda lime reaction, by simply substituting carbon dioxide by silica dioxide in the reactions mentioned here above as follows:

reaction 1:	SiO_{2} + NaOH	→	NaHSiO_{3}	silica dissolution by NaOH: high pH
reaction 2:	NaHSiO_{3} + Ca(OH)_{2}	→	CaSiO_{3} + H_{2}O + NaOH	C-S-H precipitation and regeneration of NaOH
sum (1+2):	SiO_{2} + Ca(OH)_{2}	→	CaSiO_{3} + H_{2}O	global reaction: Pozzolanic reaction catalysed by NaOH

== See also ==
- Carbon dioxide scrubber – Device which absorbs carbon dioxide from circulated gas
- Alkali–silica reaction – Chemical reaction damaging concrete
- Soda–lime glass – Type of glass, made from silica, soda, lime and aluminum oxide
- Baralyme – Carbon dioxide scrubber absorbent mixture of calcium and barium hydroxides
