= Kieselkalk =

Siliceous limestone in Switzerland

Kieselkalk is also known as the Helvetic Siliceous Limestone. It was deposited during the Lower Cretaceous epoch. It can contain up to 40% of very fine (1-10 μm), evenly distributed authigenic quartz crystals. Early diagenetic dissolution of opal sponge spicules led to silica enrichment of interstitial waters, which reprecipitated silica in the overlying horizons, forming tiny quartz crystals in pore spaces.

Because of its high silica content, the Kieselkalk is much less susceptible to karstification than the overlying Schrattenkalk. In the Siebenhengste-Hohgant-Höhle cave system in Switzerland, large galleries, easily developing in the Schrattenkalk, become impenetrable fissures networks when water disappears in the Kieselkalk.

== Susceptibility to alkali silica reaction ==
Siliceous limestones can be very prone to the Alkali Silica Reaction (ASR) and their use as aggregate is often the cause of premature concrete degradation and problems in civil engineering (concrete spalling, bridges failure, ...).

== See also ==
- Alkali-aggregate reaction
