= Pozzolan =

Siliceous volcanic ashes commonly used as supplementary cementitious material

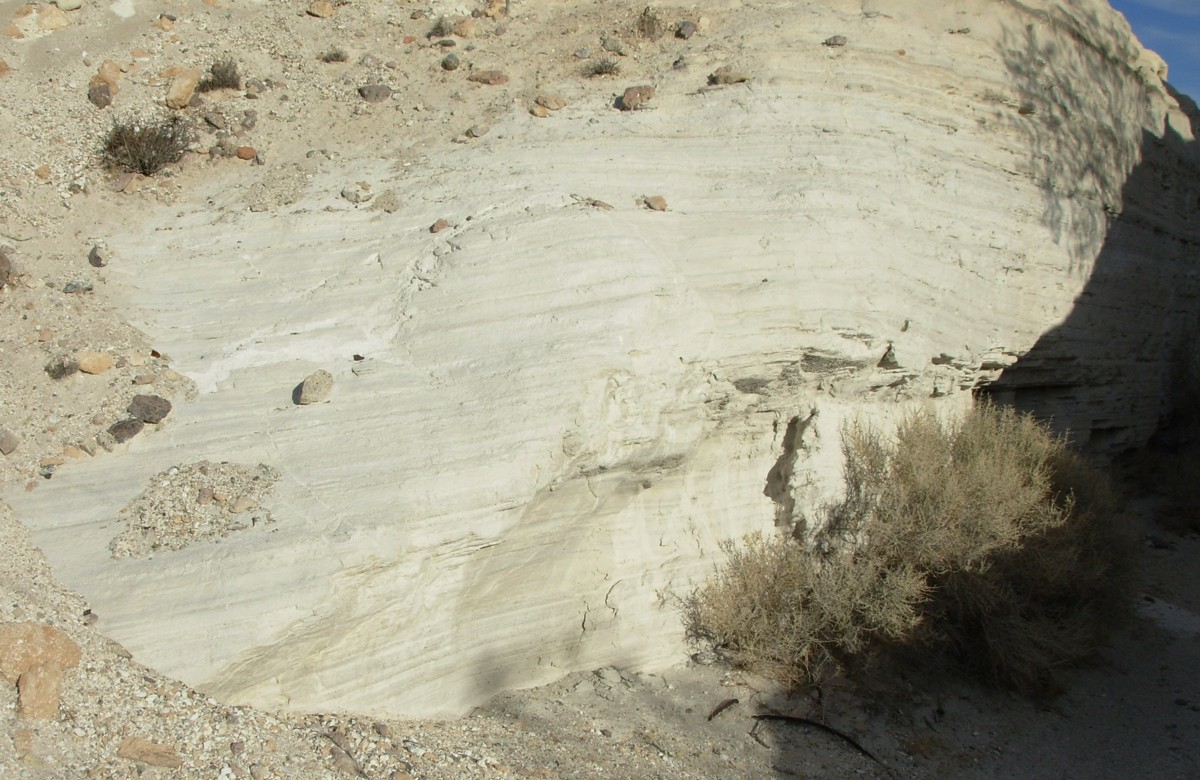
Natural pozzolana (volcanic ash) deposits situated in Southern California in the United States

Pozzolans are a broad class of siliceous and aluminous materials which, in themselves, possess little or no cementitious value but which will, in finely divided form and in the presence of water, react chemically with calcium hydroxide (Ca(OH)_{2}) at ordinary temperature to form compounds possessing cementitious properties. The quantification of the capacity of a pozzolan to react with calcium hydroxide and water is given by measuring its pozzolanic activity. Pozzolana are naturally occurring pozzolans of volcanic origin.

== History ==
Mixtures of calcined lime and finely ground, active aluminosilicate materials were pioneered and developed as inorganic binders in the Ancient world. Architectural remains of the Minoan civilization on Crete have shown evidence of the combined use of slaked lime and additions of finely ground potsherds for waterproof renderings in baths, cisterns and aqueducts. Evidence of the deliberate use of volcanic materials such as volcanic ashes or tuffs by the ancient Greeks dates back to at least 500–400 BC, as uncovered at the ancient city of Kameiros, Rhodes. In subsequent centuries the practice spread to the mainland and was eventually adopted and further developed by the Romans. The Romans used volcanic pumices and tuffs found in neighbouring territories, the most famous ones found in Pozzuoli (Naples), hence the name pozzolan, and in Segni (Latium). Preference was given to natural pozzolan sources such as German trass, but crushed ceramic waste was frequently used when natural deposits were not locally available. The exceptional lifetime and preservation conditions of some of the most famous Roman buildings such as the Pantheon or the Pont du Gard constructed using pozzolan-lime mortars and concrete testify both to the excellent workmanship achieved by Roman engineers and to the durable properties of the binders they used.

Much of the practical skill and knowledge regarding the use of pozzolans was lost at the decline of the Roman empire. The rediscovery of Roman architectural practices, as described by Vitruvius in De architectura, also led to the reintroduction of lime-pozzolan binders. Particularly the strength, durability and hydraulic capability of hardening underwater made them popular construction materials during the 16th–18th century. The invention of other hydraulic lime cements and eventually Portland cement in the 18th and 19th century resulted in a gradual decline of the use of pozzolan-lime binders, which develop strength less rapidly.

Over the course of the 20th century the use of pozzolans as additions (the technical term is "supplementary cementitious material", usually abbreviated "SCM") to Portland cement concrete mixtures became common practice. Combinations of economic and technical aspects and, increasingly, environmental concerns have made so-called blended cements, i.e., cements that contain considerable amounts of supplementary cementitious materials (mostly around 20% by weight, but over 80% by weight in Portland blast-furnace slag cement), the most widely produced and used cement type by the beginning of the 21st century.

== Pozzolanic materials ==
The general definition of a pozzolan embraces a large number of materials which vary widely in terms of origin, composition and properties. Both natural and artificial (man-made) materials show pozzolanic activity and are used as supplementary cementitious materials. Artificial pozzolans can be produced deliberately, for instance by thermal activation of kaolin-clays to obtain metakaolin, or can be obtained as waste or by-products from high-temperature process such as fly ashes from coal-fired electricity production. The most commonly used pozzolans today are industrial by-products such as fly ash, silica fume from silicon smelting, highly reactive metakaolin, and burned organic matter residues rich in silica such as rice husk ash. Their use has been firmly established and regulated in many countries. However, the supply of high-quality pozzolanic by-products is limited and many local sources are already fully exploited. Alternatives to the established pozzolanic by-products are to be found on the one hand in an expansion of the range of industrial by-products or societal waste considered and on the other hand in an increased usage of naturally occurring pozzolans.

Natural pozzolanas are abundant in certain locations and are extensively used as an addition to Portland cement in countries such as Italy, Germany, Greece and China. Volcanic ashes and pumices largely composed of volcanic glass are commonly used, as are deposits in which the volcanic glass has been altered to zeolites by interaction with alkaline waters. Deposits of sedimentary origin are less common, with diatomaceous earths, formed by the accumulation of siliceous diatom microskeletons, a prominent source.

== Use ==
The benefits of pozzolan use in cement and concrete are threefold. First is the economic gain obtained by replacing a substantial part of the Portland cement by cheaper natural pozzolans or industrial by-products. Second is the lowering of the blended cement environmental cost associated with the greenhouse gases emitted during Portland cement production. A third advantage is the increased durability of the end product.

Blending of pozzolans with Portland cement is of limited interference in the conventional production process and offers the opportunity to convert waste (for example, fly ash) into durable construction materials.

A reduction of 40 percent of Portland cement in the concrete mix is usually feasible when replaced with a combination of pozzolanic materials. Pozzolans can be used to control setting, increase durability, reduce cost and reduce pollution without significantly reducing the final compressive strength or other performance characteristics.

The properties of hardened blended cements are strongly related to the development of the binder microstructure, i.e., to the distribution, type, shape and dimensions of both reaction products and pores. The beneficial effects of pozzolan addition in terms of higher compressive strength, performance and greater durability are mostly attributed to the pozzolanic reaction in which calcium hydroxide is consumed to produce additional C-S-H and C-A-H reaction products. These pozzolanic reaction products fill in pores and result in a refining of the pore size distribution or pore structure. This results in a lowered permeability of the binder.

The contribution of the pozzolanic reaction to cement strength is usually developed at later curing stages, depending on the pozzolanic activity. In the large majority of blended cements initial lower strengths can be observed compared to the parent Portland cement. However, especially in the case of pozzolans finer than the Portland cement, the decrease in early strength is usually less than what can be expected based on the dilution factor. This can be explained by the filler effect, in which small SCM grains fill in the space between the cement particles, resulting in a much denser binder. The acceleration of the Portland cement hydration reactions can also partially accommodate the loss of early strength.

The increased chemical resistance to the ingress and harmful action of aggressive solutions constitutes one of the main advantages of pozzolan blended cements. The improved durability of the pozzolan-blended binders lengthen the service life of structures and reduces the costly and inconvenient need to replace damaged construction.

One of the principal reasons for increased durability is the lowered calcium hydroxide content available to take part in deleterious expansive reactions induced by, for example, sulfate attack. Furthermore, the reduced binder permeability slows down the ingress of harmful ions such as chlorine or carbonate. The pozzolanic reaction can also reduce the risk of expansive alkali-silica reactions between the cement and aggregates by changing the binder pore solution. Lowering the solution alkalinity and increasing alumina concentrations strongly decreases or inhibits the dissolution of the aggregate aluminosilicates.

== See also ==
- Alkali–aggregate reaction – Expansive chemical reaction damaging concrete (AAR)
- Alkali–silica reaction – Chemical reaction damaging concrete (ASR)
- Caesarea Maritima – Ancient Levantine city; its ancient artificial bay was built with pozzolan
- Calcium silicate hydrate – Main product of the hydration of Portland cement (C-S-H)
- Cement chemist notation – Abbreviated notation for chemical formulas of common oxides (CCN)
- Energetically modified cement – Class of cements, mechanically processed to transform reactivity (EMC)
- Qadad – Old technique used in plastering walls and cisterns
- Zeolite
