= Limestone Calcined Clay Cement =

Low-carbon Portland cement

Limestone Calcined Clay Cement (LC^{3}) is a low-carbon cement developed by the École Polytechnique Fédérale de Lausanne (EPFL), IIT- Delhi, IIT-Madras, and the Central University of Las Villas (Cuba). The cement can reduce carbon dioxide emissions (CO_{2}) related to manufacturing by 30% as compared to ordinary Portland cement. In 2014, the LC3 project received 4 million CHF in Research and Development funding from the Swiss Agency for Development and Cooperation (SDC).

== History ==
Limestone Calcined Clay Cement (LC3) originated from research at the École Polytechnique Fédérale de Lausanne (EPFL) in Switzerland as part of a global initiative to create low-carbon, resource-efficient alternatives to ordinary Portland cement. The concept was first explored through collaboration between EPFL and the Central University “Marta Abreu” of Las Villas (UCLV) in Cuba, where early studies demonstrated that a blend of calcined clay and limestone could achieve comparable strength and durability to conventional cement while significantly reducing CO₂ emissions. Building upon this foundation, the project expanded to India around 2013, with the Indian Institute of Technology Delhi (IIT Delhi) and the Indian Institute of Technology Madras (IIT Madras) joining EPFL and UCLV to advance testing, standardisation, and industrial application of the technology.

In 2014, the Swiss Agency for Development and Cooperation (SDC) provided approximately CHF 4 million to fund LC3's research and development, enabling extensive laboratory testing, pilot production, and standardisation across partner institutions. IIT Delhi emerged as a leading research and implementation hub, coordinating pilot projects, developing industrial partnerships, and mentoring technology resource centres in Asia and Africa. The findings confirmed that LC3 can reduce carbon emissions by up to 40% compared to ordinary Portland cement. IIT Madras, contributed through extensive materials research focused on durability and environmental performance.

Together, these collaborations have transformed LC3 from a laboratory concept into a commercially viable material. By the 2020s, LC3 had been successfully deployed in several full-scale projects in India — including at JK Lakshmi's Jhajjar plant and the Noida International Airport — marking a milestone in the global transition toward sustainable cement technologies.

== Composition ==
The main components of LC3 cements are clinker, calcined clay, limestone, and gypsum. The fresh concrete production involves synergetic hydration. Adding large amounts of calcined clay (metakaolin) and ground limestone to the dry cement powder, when adding water to the mix for making concrete, cement and additives start to hydrate and the soluble aluminates released in water from the calcined clay react with the calcium carbonate from the finely crushed limestone. The reactive alumina present in metakaolin reacts with the ground limestone, leading to a less porous structure than in other concretes and providing equal strength as with higher levels of clinker substitution.

== Durability ==
Because calcined clay cements contain less portlandite than ordinary Portland cement, their capacity to buffer acidic attack is reduced; under accelerated laboratory exposure to CO_{2}, pastes containing calcined clay have shown lower carbonation resistance than ordinary Portland cement. Within ternary limestone-calcined-clay (LC3) formulations, carbonation resistance increased with higher metakaolin content in the calcined clay, and was further improved by the presence of limestone, which promotes the formation of carboaluminate phases. Because of this reduced carbonation resistance, LC3 cements have been considered better suited to unreinforced concrete elements than to reinforced concrete, where a drop in pore-solution pH raises the risk of steel corrosion.

== Environmental impact ==
Limestone Calcined Clay Cement is a low-carbon alternative to the standard Portland cement. LC3 can reduce CO_{2} emissions related to cement manufacturing by reducing the amount of clinker, replacing it with finely ground limestone and calcined clays. Low-grade kaolin clays can be used for the production of LC3 and are abundantly available in many parts of the world.

A 2024 life cycle assessment found that a 3D printable concrete made with LC3 had a 36% lower climate change impact than a comparable 3D printing material with the same compressive strength when modeled in Quebec, and a 46% lower impact when modeled in France. The study also noted that results varied by up to 15% depending on where raw materials were sourced.

== See also ==
- Green cement
- Cement
- Limestone
- Portland cement
- FUTURECEM
