= Alkali–carbonate reaction =

Alkali-reaction affecting impure dolomite aggregates with formation of expansive brucite

The alkali–carbonate reaction is an alteration process first suspected in the 1950s in Canada for the degradation of concrete containing dolomite aggregates.

Alkali from the cement might react with the dolomite crystals present in the aggregate inducing the production of poorly soluble brucite, (MgOH)_{2}, and calcite (CaCO_{3}). This mechanism was tentatively proposed by Swenson and Gillott (1964) and may be written as follows:

$$\ce{CaMg(CO3)2 + 2 NaOH -> Mg(OH)2 + CaCO3 + Na2CO3}$$

Brucite (Mg(OH)_{2}), could be responsible for the volumetric expansion after de-dolomitisation of the aggregates, due to absorption of water.

The alkali–carbonate reaction is also catalyzed by the soluble NaOH produced by the reaction of Na_{2}CO_{3} with Ca(OH)_{2} (portlandite) present in the hardened cement paste (HCP), therefore perpetuating the reaction indefinitely as observed by Fournier and Bérubé (2000) and Bérubé et al. (2005).

$$\ce{Na2CO3 + Ca(OH)2 -> CaCO3 + 2 NaOH}$$

The sum of the two above mentioned reactions leading to the ultimate production of brucite and calcium carbonate can be written as follows:

$$\ce{CaMg(CO3)2 + Ca(OH)2 -> Mg(OH)2 + 2 CaCO3}$$

The alkali-carbonate reaction is much less understood than the alkali-silica reaction. Both reactions share in common the continuous regeneration of the sodium hydroxide (NaOH) after the reaction of soluble sodium carbonate or sodium silicate with calcium hydroxide, Ca(OH)_{2}. However, impure dolomitic aggregates also often contain clay impurities, and small amounts of pyrite (FeS_{2}) and organic matter. The alkali-carbonate reaction could therefore also simply hide an alkali-silica or an alkali-silicate reaction. Anyway a chemical coupling between ACR and ASR cannot be ruled out.

== See also ==
- Alkali–aggregate reaction
- Alkali–silica reaction
- Calthemite: Secondary calcium carbonate deposit growing under man-made structures
- Pozzolanic reaction
