= Alkali–aggregate reaction =

Expansive chemical reaction damaging concrete

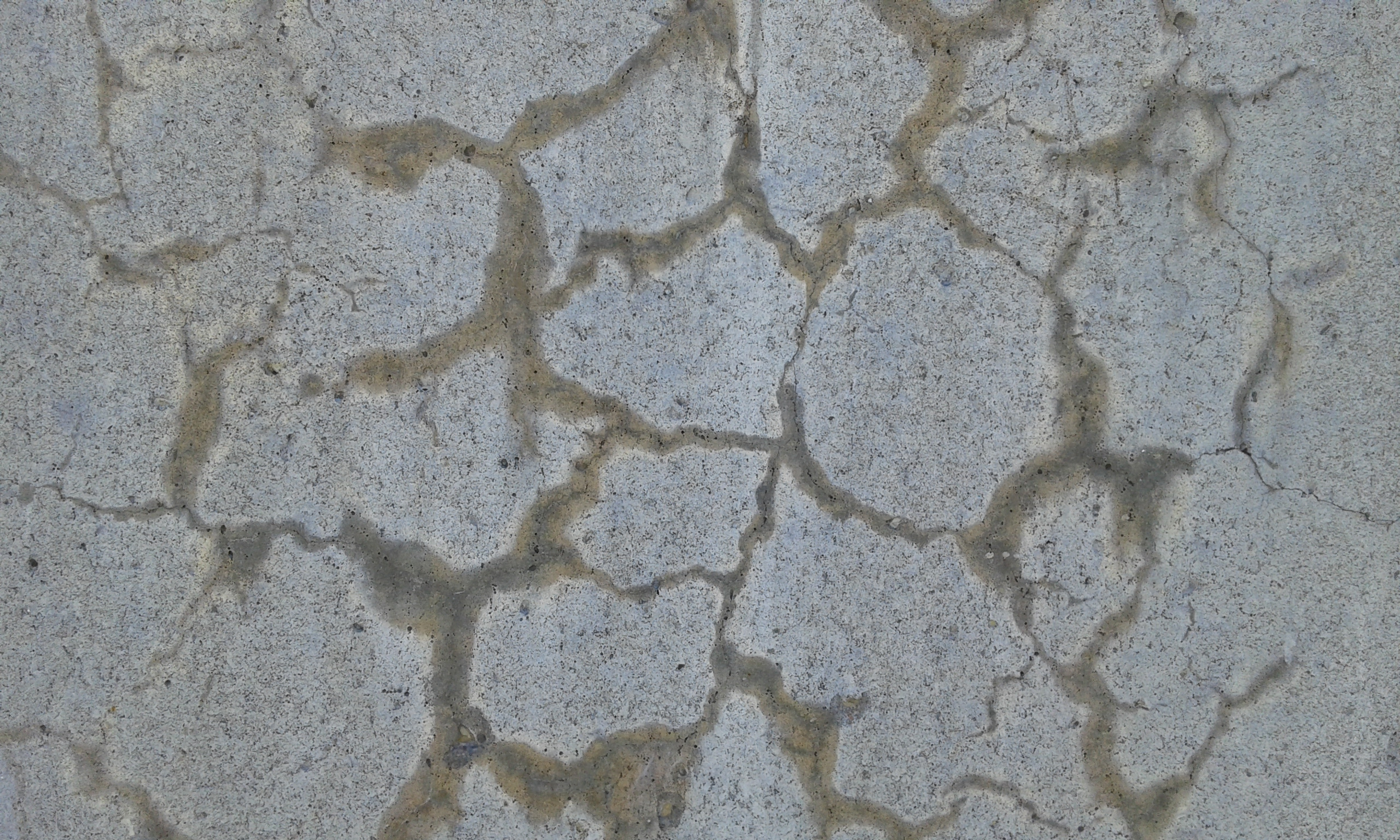
Surface of a concrete pillar with crack pattern of alkali–silica reaction

Alkali–aggregate reaction is a term mainly referring to a reaction which occurs over time in concrete between the highly alkaline cement paste and non-crystalline silicon dioxide, which is found in many common aggregates. This reaction can cause the expansion of the altered aggregate, leading to spalling and loss of strength of concrete.

== More accurate terminology ==
The alkali–aggregate reaction is a general, but relatively vague, expression which can lead to confusion. More exact definitions include the following:

1. Alkali–silica reaction (ASR, the most common reaction of this type);
2. Alkali–silicate reaction, and;
3. Alkali–carbonate reaction.

The alkali–silica reaction is the most common form of alkali–aggregate reaction.
Two other types are:

- the alkali–silicate reaction, in which layer silicate minerals (clay minerals), sometimes present as impurities, are attacked, and;
- the alkali–carbonate reaction, which is an uncommon attack on certain argillaceous dolomitic limestones, likely involving the expansion of the mineral brucite (Mg(OH)_{2}).

The pozzolanic reaction which occurs in the setting of the mixture of slaked lime and pozzolanic materials has also features similar to the alkali–silica reaction, mainly the formation of calcium silicate hydrate (C-S-H).

== See also ==
- Energetically modified cement (EMC)
- Calthemite
- Pozzolanic reaction
