= Ultrasonic pulse velocity test =

Concrete quality test

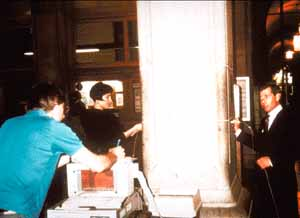
Ultrasonic pulse velocity is being used to obtain typical wave velocities for granite. Note transmitter on one side of the column and receiver on opposite.

An ultrasonic pulse velocity test is an in-situ, nondestructive test to check the quality of concrete and natural rocks. In this test, the strength and quality of concrete or rock is assessed by measuring the velocity of an ultrasonic pulse passing through a concrete structure or natural rock formation.

This test is conducted by passing a pulse of ultrasonic through concrete to be tested and measuring the time taken by pulse to get through the structure. Higher velocities indicate good quality and continuity of the material, while slower velocities may indicate concrete with many cracks or voids.

Ultrasonic testing equipment includes a pulse generation circuit, consisting of electronic circuit for generating pulses and a transducer for transforming electronic pulses into mechanical pulses having an oscillation frequency in range of 40 kHz to 50 kHz, and a pulse reception circuit that receives the signal.

The transducer, clock, oscillation circuit, and power source are assembled for use. After calibration to a standard sample of material with known properties, the transducers are placed on opposite sides of the material. Pulse velocity is measured by a simple formula:

$\text{Pulse Velocity} = \frac{\text{Width of structure}}{\text{Time taken by pulse to go through}}$.

== Applications ==
Ultrasonic Pulse Velocity can be used to:

- Evaluate the quality and homogeneity of concrete materials
- Predict the strength of concrete
- Evaluate dynamic modulus of elasticity of concrete,
- Estimate the depth of cracks in concrete.
- Detect internal flaws, cracks, honeycombing, and poor patches.

The test can also be used to evaluate the effectiveness of crack repair. Ultrasonic testing is an indicative and other tests such as destructive testing must be conducted to find the structural and mechanical properties of the material.

== Regulation and standards ==
A procedure for ultrasonic testing is outlined in ASTM C597 - 09.

In India, till 2018 ultrasonic testing was conducted according to IS 13311-1992.From 2018, procedure and specification for Ultrasonic pulse velocity test is outlined in IS 516 Part 5:Non destructive testing of concrete Section 1:Ultrasonic Pulse Velocity Testing. This test indicates the quality of workmanship and to find the cracks and defects in concrete.

== Factors affecting testing ==
The important factors that affect/influence the ultrasonic pulse velocity test are:

1. Surface Conditions of Concrete
2. Moisture Content of Concrete
3. Path Length of Concrete Structure
4. Shape and Size of Concrete Structure
5. Temperature of Concrete
6. Stress to Which the Structure is Subjected
7. Reinforcing Bars
8. Contact Between the Transducer and Concrete
9. Cracks and Voids in Concrete
10. Density and Modulus of Elasticity of Aggregate

== Usage ==
This test is recommended in some of testing done by the Indian government to certify and check construction of residential buildings.
