= Silica fume =

Silicon dioxide nano particles

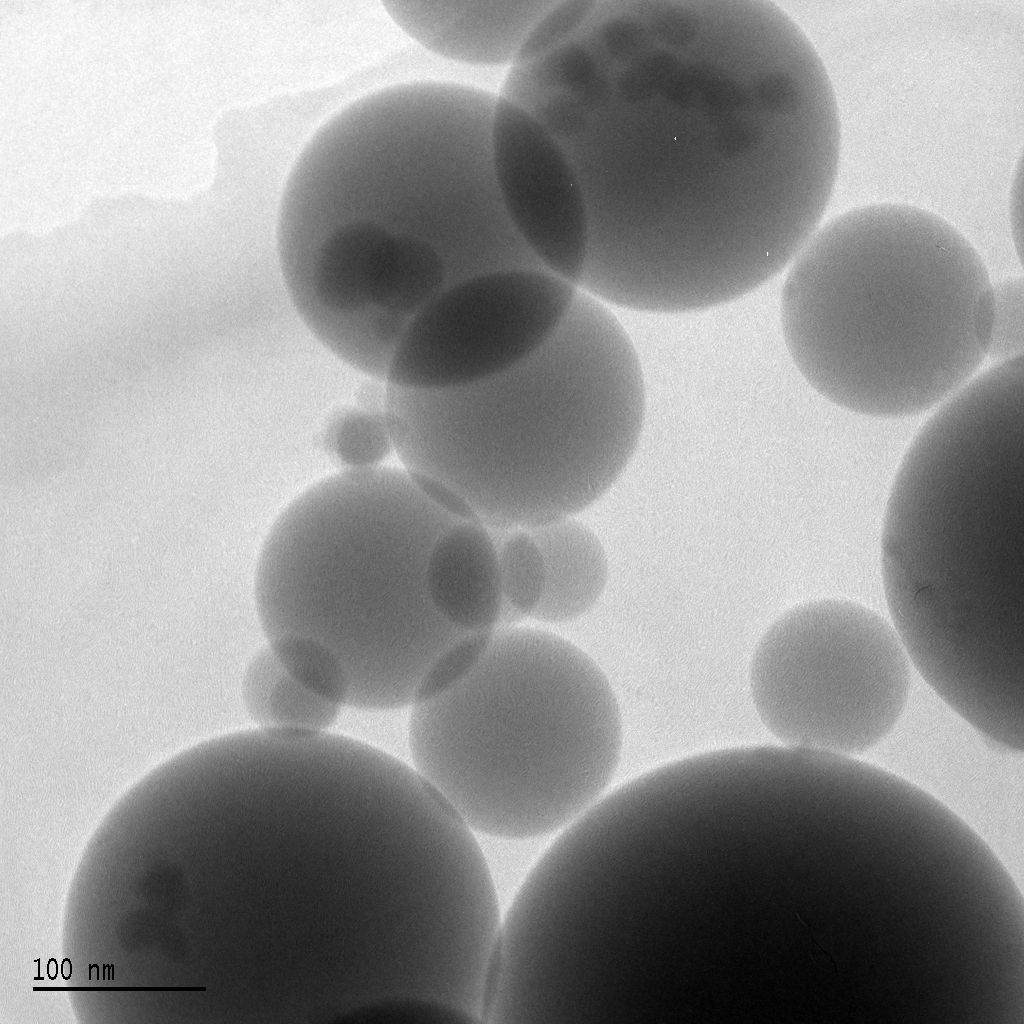
Silica fume particles viewed in a transmission electron microscope

Silica fume, also known as microsilica, (CAS number 69012-64-2, EINECS number 273-761-1) is an amorphous (non-crystalline) polymorph of silicon dioxide, silica. It is an ultrafine powder collected as a by-product of the silicon and ferrosilicon alloy production and consists of spherical particles with an average particle diameter of 150 nm. The main field of application is as pozzolanic material for high performance concrete.

It is sometimes confused with fumed silica (also known as pyrogenic silica, CAS number 112945-52-5). However, the production process, particle characteristics and fields of application of fumed silica are all different from those of silica fume.

== History ==
The first testing of silica fume in Portland-cement-based concretes was carried out in 1952. The biggest drawback to exploring the properties of silica fume was a lack of material with which to experiment. Early research used an expensive additive called fumed silica, an amorphous form of silica made by combustion of silicon tetrachloride in a hydrogen-oxygen flame. Silica fume on the other hand, is a very fine pozzolanic, amorphous material, a by-product of the production of elemental silicon or ferrosilicon alloys in electric arc furnaces. Before the late 1960s in Europe and the mid-1970s in the United States, silica fumes were simply vented into the atmosphere.

With the implementation of tougher environmental laws during the mid-1970s, silicon smelters began to collect the silica fume and search for its applications. The early work done in Norway received most of the attention, since it had shown that Portland cement-based-concretes containing silica fumes had very high strengths and low porosities. Since then the research and development of silica fume made it one of the world's most valuable and versatile admixtures for concrete and cementitious products.

== Properties ==
Components of cement: comparison of chemical and physical characteristics (Note: Values shown are approximate: those of a specific material may vary.)
Property		Portland cement	Siliceous (Note: ASTM C618 Class F) fly ash	Calcareous (Note: ASTM C618 Class C) fly ash	Slag cement	Silica fume
Proportion by mass (%)	SiO_{2}	21.9	52	35	35	85–97
Proportion by mass (%)	Al_{2}O_{3}	6.9	23	18	12	—
Proportion by mass (%)	Fe_{2}O_{3}	3	11	6	1	—
Proportion by mass (%)	CaO	63	5	21	40	< 1
Proportion by mass (%)	MgO	2.5	—	—	—	—
Proportion by mass (%)	SO_{3}	1.7	—	—	—	—
Specific surface (m^{2}/kg) (Note: Specific surface measurements for silica fume by nitrogen adsorption (BET) method, others by air permeability method (Blaine).)		370	420	420	400	15,000 – 30,000
Specific gravity		3.15	2.38	2.65	2.94	2.22
General purpose		Primary binder	Cement replacement	Cement replacement	Cement replacement	Property enhancer

Silica fume is an ultrafine material with spherical particles less than 1 μm in diameter, the average being about 0.15 μm. This makes it approximately 100 times smaller than the average cement particle. The bulk density of silica fume depends on the degree of densification in the silo and varies from 130 (undensified) to 600 kg/m^{3}. The specific gravity of silica fume is generally in the range of 2.2 to 2.3. The specific surface area of silica fume can be measured with the BET method or nitrogen adsorption method. It typically ranges from 15,000 to 30,000 m^{2}/kg.

== Production ==
Silica fume is a byproduct in the carbothermic reduction of high-purity quartz with carbonaceous materials like coal, coke, wood-chips, in electric arc furnaces in the production of silicon and ferrosilicon alloys.

== Applications ==
=== Concrete ===
Because of its extreme fineness and high silica content, silica fume is a very effective pozzolanic material. Standard specifications for silica fume used in cementitious mixtures are ASTM C1240, EN 13263.

Silica fume is added to Portland cement concrete to improve its properties, in particular its compressive strength, bond strength, and abrasion resistance. These improvements stem from both the mechanical improvements resulting from addition of a very fine powder to the cement paste mix as well as from the pozzolanic reactions between the silica fume and free calcium hydroxide in the paste.

Addition of silica fume also reduces the permeability of concrete to chloride ions, which protects the reinforcing steel of concrete from corrosion, especially in chloride-rich environments such as coastal regions and those of humid continental roadways and runways (because of the use of deicing salts) and saltwater bridges. Furthermore, Silica Fumes has important uses in oil and gas operations. Silica fume can be used for a primary placement of grout as a hydraulic seal in the well bore, or secondary applications such as remedial operations including leak repairs, splits, and closing of depleted zones.

Prior to the mid-1970s, nearly all silica fume was discharged into the atmosphere. After environmental concerns necessitated the collection and landfilling of silica fume, it became economically viable to use silica fume in various applications, in particular high-performance concrete. Effects of silica fume on different properties of fresh and hardened concrete include:

- Workability: With the addition of silica fume, the slump loss with time is directly proportional to increase in the silica fume content due to the introduction of large surface area in the concrete mix by its addition. Although the slump decreases, the mix remains highly cohesive.
- Segregation and bleeding: Silica fume reduces bleeding significantly because the free water is consumed in wetting of the large surface area of the silica fume and hence the free water left in the mix for bleeding also decreases. Silica fume also blocks the pores in the fresh concrete so water within the concrete is not allowed to come to the surface.

=== Silicon carbide ===
The silica fumes, as byproduct, may be used to produce silicon carbide.

== See also ==
- Alkali–silica reaction
- Engineered cementitious composite
- Energetically modified cement (EMC)
- Fly ash
- Kaolinite
- Pozzolan
- Rice husk ash
- Metakaolin
