= Pozzolanic activity =

Measure of chemical reaction in cement

Pozzolanic activity is a measure of the reaction rate between a pozzolan and Ca^{2+} or calcium hydroxide (Ca(OH)_{2}) in the presence of water. The rate of the pozzolanic reaction is dependent on the intrinsic characteristics of the pozzolan such as the specific surface area, the chemical composition, and the active phase content.

Physical surface adsorption is not considered as being part of the pozzolanic activity, because no irreversible molecular bonds are formed in the process.

== Reaction ==
The pozzolanic reaction is the chemical reaction that occurs in Portland cement upon the addition of pozzolans. It is the main reaction involved in the Roman concrete invented in Ancient Rome and used to build, for example, the Pantheon. The pozzolanic reaction converts a silica-rich precursor with no cementing properties, to a calcium silicate, with good cementing properties.

In chemical terms, the pozzolanic reaction occurs between calcium hydroxide, also known as portlandite (Ca(OH)_{2}), and silicic acid (written as H_{4}SiO_{4}, or Si(OH)_{4}, in the geochemical notation):

Ca(OH)_{2} + H_{4}SiO_{4} → CaH_{2}SiO_{4}·2 H_{2}O

or summarized in abbreviated cement chemist notation:

CH + SH → C-S-H

The pozzolanic reaction can also be written in an ancient industrial silicate notations as:

Ca(OH)_{2} + H_{2}SiO_{3} → CaSiO_{3}·2 H_{2}O

or even directly:

Ca(OH)_{2} + SiO_{2} → CaSiO_{3}·H_{2}O

Both notations still coexist in the literature, depending on the research field considered. However, the more recent geochemical notation in which the silicon atom is tetracoordinated by four hydroxyl groups (Si(OH)_{4}, also commonly noted H_{4}SiO_{4}) is more correct than the ancient industrial silicate notation, in which silicic acid (H_{2}SiO_{3}) was represented in the same way as carbonic acid (H_{2}CO_{3}) whose geometrical configuration is trigonal planar. When only considering mass balance, they are equivalent, and both are used.

The product CaH_{2}SiO_{4}·2 H_{2}O is a calcium silicate hydrate, also abbreviated as C-S-H in cement chemist notation; the hyphenation denotes the variable stoichiometry. The atomic (or molar) ratio Ca/Si, CaO/SiO_{2}, or C/S, and the number of water molecules can vary, and the aforementioned stoichiometry may differ.

Many pozzolans may also contain aluminate, or Al(OH)_{4}^{−}, that will react with calcium hydroxide and water to form calcium aluminate hydrates such as C_{4}AH_{13}, C_{3}AH_{6} or hydrogarnet, or in combination with silica C_{2}ASH_{8} or strätlingite (cement chemist notation). In the presence of anionic groups such as sulfate, carbonate, or chloride, AFm phases and AFt or ettringite phases can form.

The pozzolanic reaction is a long-term reaction, which involves dissolved silicic acid, water, and CaO or Ca(OH)_{2} or other pozzolans to form a strong cementation matrix. This process is often irreversible. A sufficient amount of free calcium ions and a high pH of 12+ are needed to initiate and maintain the pozzolanic reaction. This is because at a pH of around 12, the solubility of silicon and aluminium ions is high enough to support the reaction.

== Activity-determining parameters ==
=== Particle properties ===
Prolonged grinding results in an increased pozzolanic activity by creating a larger specific surface area available for reaction. Moreover, grinding creates crystallographic defects at and below the particle surface. The dissolution rate of the strained or partially disconnected silicate moieties is strongly enhanced. Even materials which are commonly not regarded as behaving as pozzolans, such as quartz, can become reactive once ground below a certain critical particle diameter.

=== Composition ===
The overall chemical composition of a pozzolan is considered as one of the parameters governing long-term performance (e.g. compressive strength) of the blended cement binder. ASTM C618 prescribes that a pozzolan should be at least 70% SiO_{2} + Al_{2}O_{3} + Fe_{2}O_{3} by mass. In case of a (quasi-)one-phase material such as blast-furnace slag, the overall chemical composition can be considered as a meaningful parameter; for multi-phase materials, only a correlation between the pozzolanic activity and the chemistry of the active phases can be sought.

Many pozzolans consist of a heterogeneous mixture of phases of different pozzolanic activity. Obviously, the content in reactive phases is an important property determining the overall reactivity. In general, the pozzolanic activity of phases thermodynamically stable at ambient conditions is low when compared (on an equal-specific-surface basis) to less-thermodynamically-stable phase assemblages. Volcanic ash deposits containing large amounts of volcanic glass or zeolites are more reactive than quartz sands or detrital clay minerals. In this respect, the thermodynamic driving force behind the pozzolanic reaction serves as a rough indicator of the potential reactivity of a(n alumino-)silicate material. Similarly, materials showing structural disorder such as glasses show higher pozzolanic activities than crystalline compounds.

=== Reaction conditions ===
The rate of the pozzolanic reaction can also be controlled by external factors such as the mix proportions, the amount of water or space available for the formation and growth of hydration products, and the temperature of reaction. Therefore, typical blended cement mix design properties such as the replacement ratio of pozzolan for Portland cement, the water-to-binder ratio, and the curing conditions strongly affect the reactivity of the added pozzolan.

== Pozzolanic activity tests ==
=== Mechanical tests ===
Mechanical evaluation of the pozzolanic activity is based upon a comparison of the compressive strength of mortar bars containing pozzolans as a partial replacement for Portland cement to reference mortar bars containing only Portland cement as binder. The mortar bars are prepared, cast, cured, and tested following a detailed set of prescriptions. Compressive-strength testing is carried out at fixed moments, typically 3, 7, and 28 days after mortar preparation. A material is considered pozzolanically active when it contributes to the compressive strength, taking into account the effect of dilution. Most national and international technical standards or norms include variations of this methodology.

=== Chemical tests ===
A pozzolanic material is by definition capable of binding calcium hydroxide in the presence of water. Therefore, the chemical measurement of this pozzolanic activity represents a way of evaluating pozzolanic materials. This can be done by directly measuring the amount of calcium hydroxide that a pozzolan consumes over time. At high water-to-binder ratios (suspended solutions), this can be measured by titration or by spectroscopic techniques. At lower water-to-binder ratios (pastes), thermal analysis and X-ray powder diffraction techniques are commonly used to determine remaining calcium hydroxide contents. Other direct methods have been developed that aim to directly measure the degree of reaction of the pozzolan itself. Here, selective dissolutions, X-ray powder diffraction, and scanning electron microscopy image analysis methods have been used.

Indirect methods comprise on the one hand methods that investigate which material properties are responsible for the pozzolan's reactivity with portlandite. Material properties of interest are the (re)active silica and alumina content, the specific surface area, and the reactive-mineral and amorphous phases of the pozzolanic material. Other methods indirectly determine the extent of the pozzolanic activity by measuring an indicative physical property of the reacting system. Measurements of electrical conductivity, chemical shrinkage of the pastes, or heat evolution by heat flow calorimetry reside in the latter category.

== See also ==
- Aerated autoclaved concrete
- Alkali-aggregate reaction
- Alkali-carbonate reaction
- Alkali-silica reaction
- Calcium silicate hydrate (C-S-H)
- Calthemite
- Cement
- Cement chemist notation
- Cenospheres
- Concrete
- Concrete degradation
- Energetically modified cement (EMC)
- Fly ash
- Geopolymer
- Metakaolin
- Portland cement
- Pozzolan
- Pozzolana
- Rice husk ash
- Roman concrete
- Silica fume
- Sodium silicate
