= Jasmine Pradissitto =

American artist and scientist

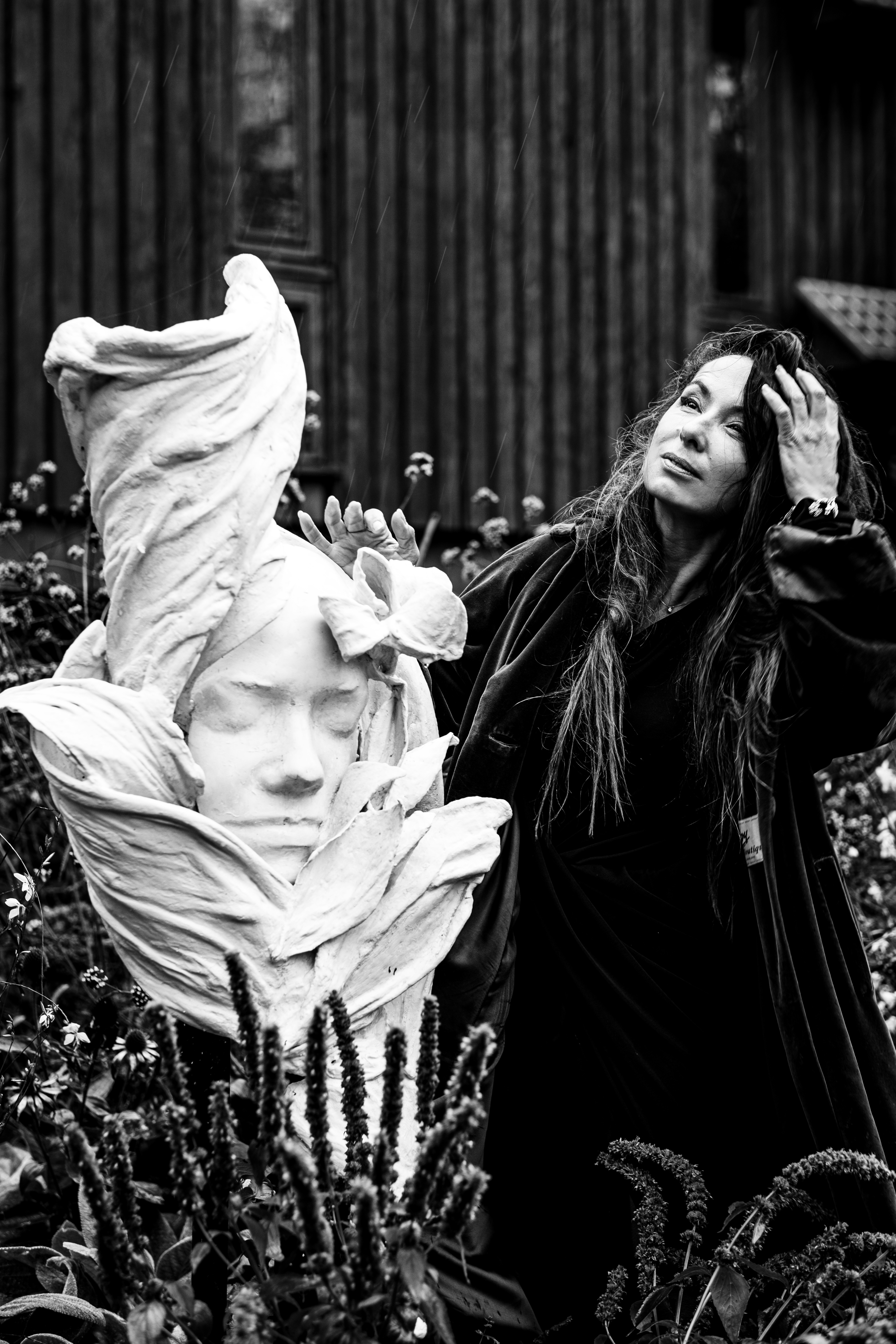
- Born: January 26, 1966 (age 60); Taunton, Somerset
- Education: University College London; Goldsmiths, University of London; Sir John Cass School of Art, Architecture and Design
- Website: www.pradissitto.com

Jasmine Pradissitto is a London-based multi-disciplinary artist, scientist, academic and speaker whose work focuses on the themes of environmentalism, sustainability and a more symbiotic adaptation as a species to the 21st century. A Fellow at The London Interdisciplinary School LIS and The RSA, since 2018 she has pioneered the use of a ceramic geopolymer that absorbs nitrogen dioxide pollution from the air, as a sculptural material. This branch of materials was discovered by Joseph Davidovits.

== Early life and education ==
Pradissitto was born in Taunton, Somerset, to an Italian father and a French mother. Her PhD from The Dept. of Electronic and Electrical Engineering, University College London, was ‘The Rare Earth Doping of silicon in fiber optics’ 1996. Whilst at UCL, she simultaneously gained a foundation degree in fine art at Goldsmiths College, taking classes during evenings. She subsequently completed a BA in fine art at the Sir John Cass School of Art, Architecture and Design in 2006, where she also undertook two years of printmaking under the tutelage of David Skingle.

From 1996-2016 she was The Director of a company she co-founded which was one of the first STEAM outreach companies in the UK.

== Career ==
Pradissitto’s work primarily focusses on issues of environmentalism, ecology, sustainability and the intersection between art and science, and has been exhibited at over 65 exhibitions and shows worldwide. As well as being a painter, she has become best known for both her sculptures made of recycled plastics and her unique use of Noxorb, a geopolymer that absorbs the harmful pollutant nitrogen dioxide from the air. She spent two years pioneering Noxtek's use for art and is currently the only artist in the world licensed to the use the geopolymer in their work.

In 2018 Pradissitto was commissioned to work with the Mayor of London Fund and the Euston Town Business Regeneration District to produce Breathe, a sculpture produced with Noxorb. The piece, which was inspired by ancient Greek and Roman sculptures of marble and stone, formed part of the Euston Green Link walking route which was designed to encourage commuters to use less polluted streets around Euston station.

In 2019 Pradissitto was commissioned to collaborate with Carrie Jenkinson, a milliner, to produce a hat for Serena Churchill, great-granddaughter of Winston Churchill, to wear at Ascot. The hat featured plastic butterflies and was partially made from recycled plastic; Pradissitto says she used the hat as a means of highlighting the threats butterflies face from environmental change and endangered biodiverse habitats.

Pradissitto was previously represented by Marine Tanguy and MTArt Agency. In 2020 she was among a group of MTArt Agency artists who designed a series of bottles for eco-friendly cleaning brand Method.

In May 2020 Pradissitto produced a new sculpture, Flower Girl, for a specially planted bee garden at the Horniman Museum in London. Made entirely of Noxtek, the sculpture is able to absorb up to 15% of its own weight in NOx molecules. The piece was designed to help local bees, as nitrogen dioxide masks the smell of flowers and prevents bees from being able to find food.

Later in 2020 Pradissitto was shortlisted for the inaugural Sustainability First Art Prize.

Pradissitto has established an outreach education consultancy that teaches STEAM subjects to children and teachers. She has also lectured for companies including Glaxo and the BBC, and continues to speak on creative and divergent thinking for institutions including the Institute of Physics and the Institute of Civil Engineers. She is also a Visiting Lecturer on Creativity at the London South Bank University.

== Personal life ==
Pradissitto lives in South London with her one son Ciaran Burns.

Influences for her work include the worlds of science and art, ancient Greek mythology, mythopoetry, technology and the Anthropocene world. Pradissitto has said how her son suffering an asthma attack in 2016 also served as an inspiration for her artwork and its focus on clean air and more sustainable ways of living.
