= Silicate =

Any polyatomic anion containing silicon and oxygen

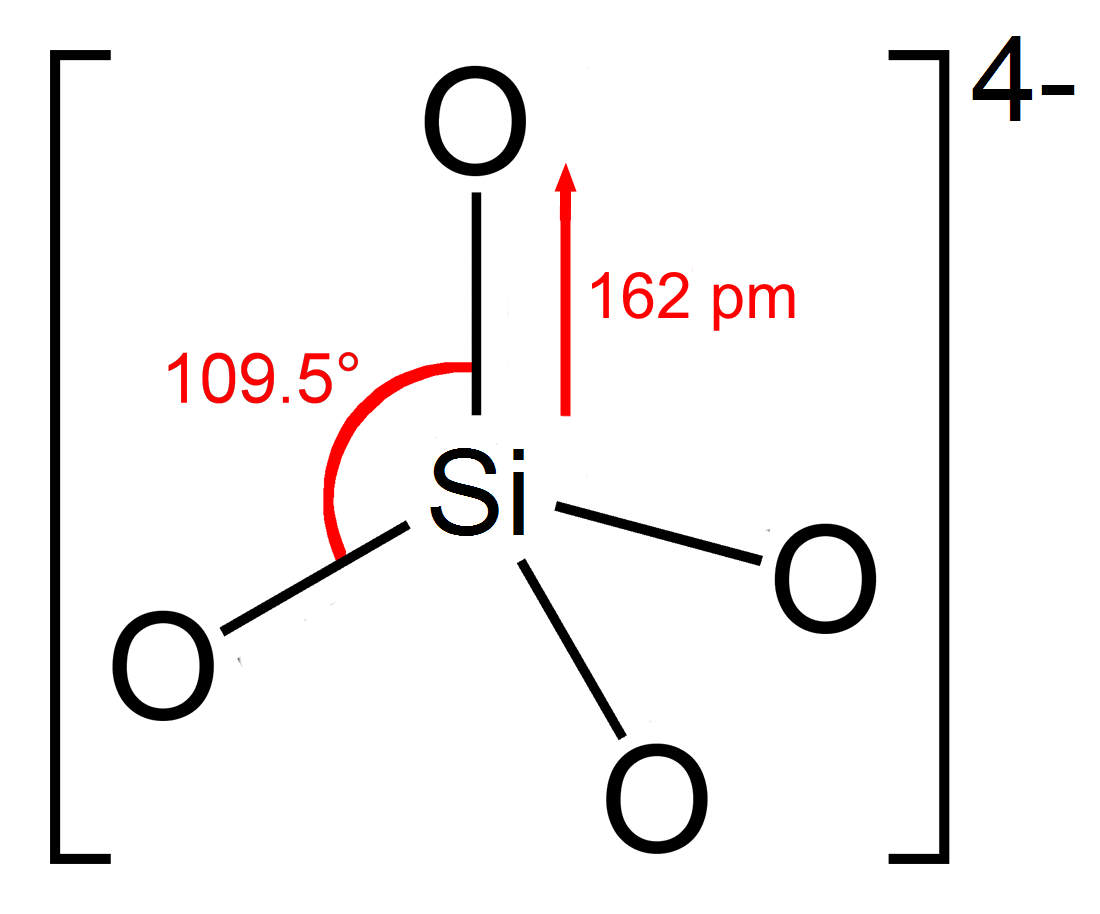
Structure of the orthosilicate anion SiO^{4−}_{4}

A silicate is any member of a family of polyatomic anions consisting of silicon and oxygen, usually with the general formula [SiO^{(4−2x)−}_{4−x}]_{n}, where 0 ≤ x < 2. The family includes orthosilicate SiO^{4−}_{4} (x = 0), metasilicate SiO^{2−}_{3} (x = 1), and pyrosilicate Si_{2}O^{6−}_{7} (x = 0.5, n = 2). The name is also used for any salt of such anions, such as sodium metasilicate; or any ester containing the corresponding chemical group, such as tetramethyl orthosilicate. The name "silicate" is sometimes extended to any anions containing silicon, even if they do not fit the general formula or contain other atoms besides oxygen; such as hexafluorosilicate [SiF_{6}]^{2−}. Most commonly, silicates are encountered as silicate minerals.

For manufacturing, technological, and artistic needs, silicates are versatile materials, both natural (such as granite, gravel, and garnet) and artificial (such as Portland cement, ceramics, glass, and waterglass).

== Structural principles ==
In most silicates, a silicon atom occupies the center of an idealized tetrahedron whose corners are four oxygen atoms, connected to it by single covalent bonds according to the octet rule. The oxygen atoms, which bear some negative charge, link to other cations (M^{n+}). This Si–O–M–O–Si linkage is strong and rigid, which properties are manifested in the rock-like silicates. The silicates can be classified according to the length and crosslinking of the silicate anions.

=== Isolated silicates ===
Isolated orthosilicate anions have the formula SiO^{4−}_{4}. A common mineral in this group is olivine ((Mg,Fe)_{2}SiO_{4}).

Two or more silicon atoms can share oxygen atoms in various ways, to form more complex anions, such as pyrosilicate Si_{2}O^{6−}_{7}.

=== Chains ===
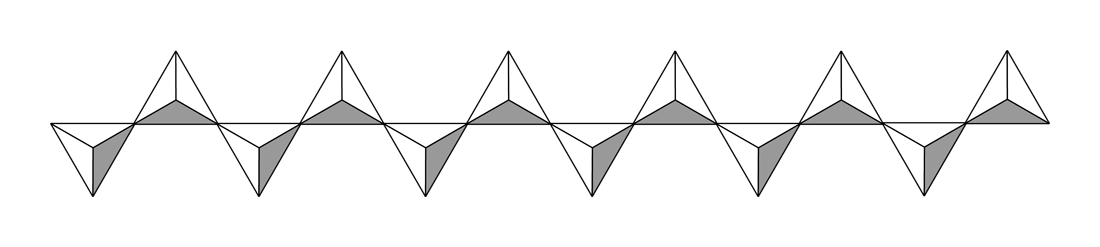
Depiction of a metasilicate chain, emphasizing the tetrahedral silicate subunits.

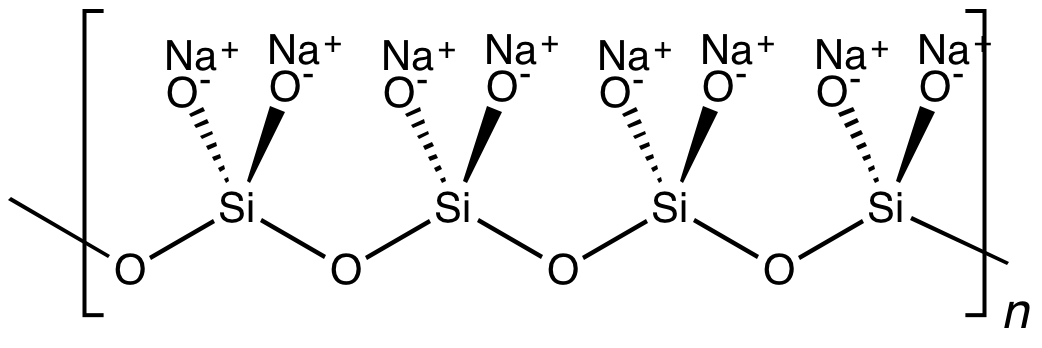
Alternative depiction of a metasilicate chain emphasizing the Si–O bonds.

With two shared oxides bound to each silicon, cyclic or polymeric structures can result. The cyclic metasilicate ring Si_{6}O^{12−}_{18} is a hexamer of SiO^{2−}_{3}. Polymeric silicate anions of can exist also as long chains.

In single-chain silicates, which are a type of inosilicate, tetrahedra link to form a chain by sharing two oxygen atoms each. A common mineral in this group is pyroxene.

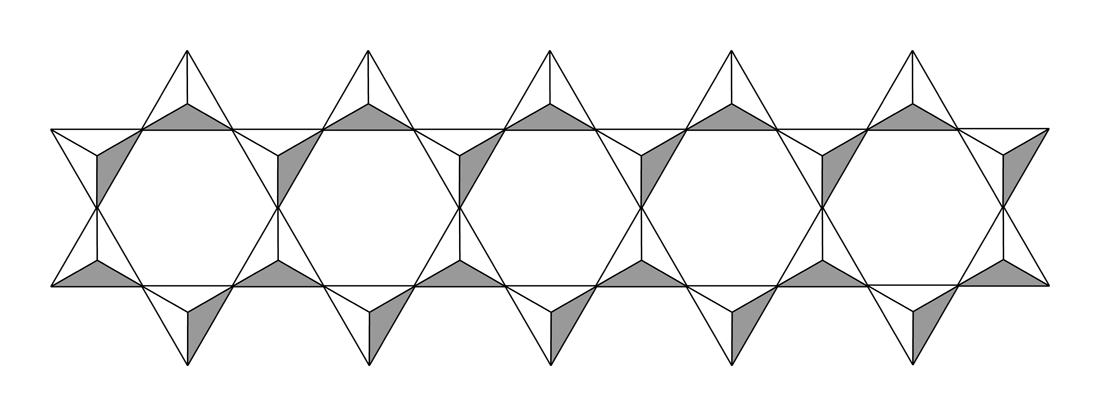
Double chain tetrahedra.

Double-chain silicates, the other category of inosilicates, occur when tetrahedra form a double chain (not always but mostly) by sharing two or three oxygen atoms each. Common minerals for this group are amphiboles.

=== Sheets ===
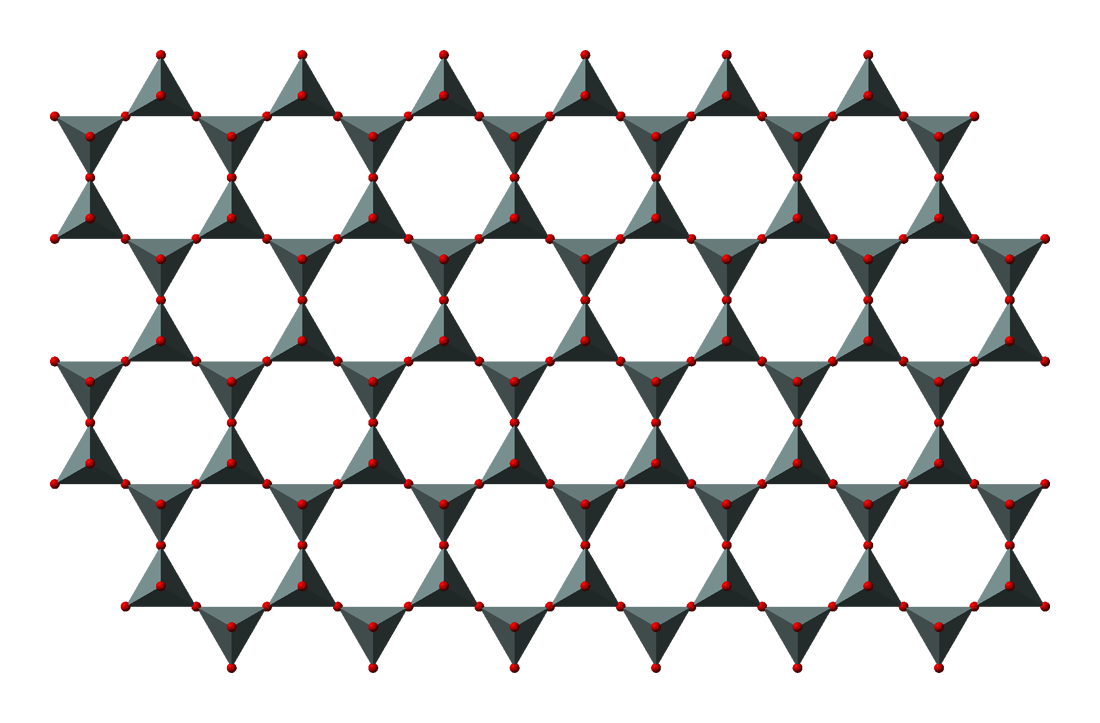
Sheet silicates.

In this group, known as phyllosilicates, tetrahedra all share three oxygen atoms each and in turn link to form two-dimensional sheets. This structure does lead to minerals in this group having one strong cleavage plane. Micas fall into this group. Both muscovite and biotite have very weak layers that can be peeled off in sheets.

=== Framework ===
In a framework silicate, known as a tectosilicate, each tetrahedron shares all 4 oxygen atoms with its neighbours, forming a 3D structure. Quartz and feldspars are in this group.

== Silicates with non-tetrahedral silicon ==
Although the tetrahedron is a common coordination geometry for silicon(IV) compounds, silicon may also occur with higher coordination numbers. For example, in the anion hexafluorosilicate SiF^{2−}_{6}, the silicon atom is surrounded by six fluorine atoms in an octahedral arrangement. This structure is also seen in the hexahydroxysilicate anion Si(OH)^{2−}_{6} that occurs in thaumasite, a mineral found rarely in nature but sometimes observed among other calcium silicate hydrates artificially formed in cement and concrete structures submitted to a severe sulfate attack in argillaceous grounds containing oxidized pyrite.

At very high pressure, such as exists in the majority of the Earth's rock, even SiO_{2} adopts the six-coordinated octahedral geometry in the mineral stishovite, a dense polymorph of silica found in the lower mantle of the Earth and also formed by shock during meteorite impacts.

== Chemical properties ==
Silicates with alkali cations and small or chain-like anions, such as sodium ortho- and metasilicate, are fairly soluble in water. They form several solid hydrates when crystallized from solution. Soluble sodium silicates and mixtures thereof, known as waterglass are important industrial and household chemicals. Silicates of non-alkali cations, or with sheet and tridimensional polymeric anions, generally have negligible solubility in water at normal conditions.

=== Reactions ===
Silicates are generally inert chemically. Hence they are common minerals. Their resiliency also recommends their use as building materials.

When treated with calcium oxides and water, silicate minerals form Portland cement.

Equilibria involving hydrolysis of silicate minerals are difficult to study. The chief challenge is the very low solubility of SiO^{4−}_{4} and its various protonated forms. Such equilibria are relevant to the processes occurring on geological time scales. Some plants excrete ligands that dissolve silicates, a step in biomineralization.

Catechols can depolymerize SiO_{2}—a component of silicates with ionic structures like orthosilicate (SiO^{4−}_{4}), metasilicate (SiO^{2−}_{3}), and pyrosilicate (Si_{2}O^{7−}_{6})—by forming bis- and tris(catecholate)silicate dianions through coordination. This complexes can be further coated on various substrates for applications such as drug delivery systems, antibacterial and antifouling applications.

=== Detection ===
Silicate anions in solution react with molybdate anions yielding yellow silicomolybdate complexes. In a typical preparation, monomeric orthosilicate was found to react completely in 75 seconds; dimeric pyrosilicate in 10 minutes; and higher oligomers in considerably longer time. In particular, the reaction is not observed with suspensions of colloidal silica.

=== Zeolite formation and geopolymers polymerisation ===
The nature of soluble silicates is relevant to understanding biomineralization and the synthesis of aluminosilicates, such as the industrially important catalysts called zeolites. Along with aluminate anions, soluble silicate anions also play a major role in the polymerization mechanism of geopolymers. Geopolymers are amorphous aluminosilicates whose production requires less energy than that of ordinary Portland cement. So, geopolymer cements could contribute to limiting the CO_{2} emissions in the Earth atmosphere and the global warming caused by this greenhouse gas.

== See also ==
- Alkali–silica reaction
- Carbon cycle
- Carbonate–silicate cycle
- Ocean acidification
