= Pyrosilicate =

Pyrosilicate anion
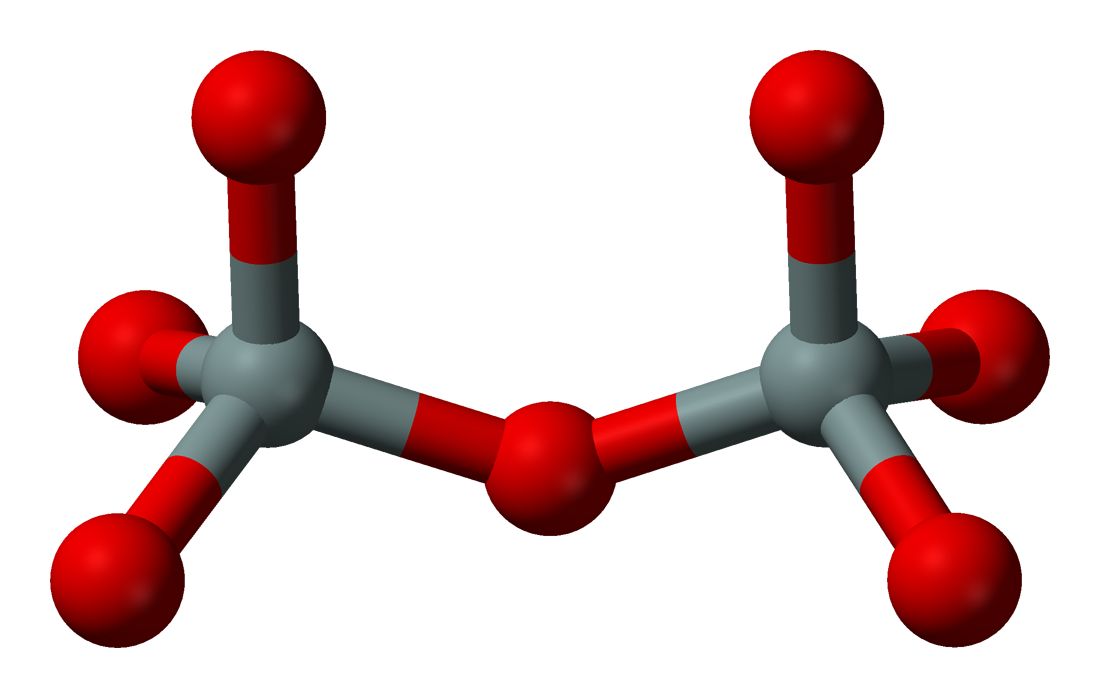

Names
- IUPAC name Pyrosilicate
- Other names disilicate, diorthosilicate

Identifiers
3D model (JSmol)	Interactive image
ChEBI	CHEBI:29380
ChemSpider	5257009
Gmelin Reference	326578
PubChem CID	6857674
CompTox Dashboard (EPA)	DTXSID701336332
- InChI: InChI=1S/O7Si2/c1-8(2,3)7-9(4,5)6/q-6 Key: KUDCBYUNCUYIDU-UHFFFAOYSA-N
- SMILES: [O-][Si]([O-])([O-])O[Si]([O-])([O-])[O-]

Properties
Chemical formula	O_{7}Si_{2}^{6−}
Molar mass	168.166 g·mol^{−1}
Conjugate acid	Pyrosilicic acid
- Except where otherwise noted, data are given for materials in their standard state (at 25 °C [77 °F], 100 kPa). (what is ?) Infobox references

A pyrosilicate is a type of chemical compound; either an ionic compound that contains the pyrosilicate anion Si_{2}O^{6−}_{7}, or an organic compound with the hexavalent ≡O_{3}Si−O−SiO_{3}≡ group. The anion is also called disilicate or diorthosilicate.

Ionic pyrosilicates can be considered salts of the unstable pyrosilicic acid, H_{6}Si_{2}O_{7}. Unlike the acid, the salts can be stable. Indeed, pyrosilicates occur widely in nature as a class of silicate minerals, specifically the sorosilicates - though some sorosilicate minerals, such as gehlenite, replace one of the silicon atoms with tetracoordinated aluminium or boron, giving the isostructural anions AlSiO^{7−}_{7} and BSiO^{7−}_{7}.

Some notable synthetic pyrosilicates include

- sodium pyrosilicate Na_{6}Si_{2}O_{7}, a possible component of water glass.
- sodium iron(II) pyrosilicate Na_{2}Fe_{2}Si_{2}O_{7}, a potential cathode material for batteries.
- sodium manganese(II) pyrosilicate Na_{2}Mn_{2}Si_{2}O_{7}, another potential cathode material.

== Structure ==
The pyrosilicate anion can be described as two SiO_{4} tetrahedra that share a vertex (an oxygen atom). The vertices that are not shared carry a negative charge each.

The structure of solid sodium pyrosilicate was described by Volker Kahlenberg and others in 2010.

Yuri Smolin and Yuri Shepelev determined in 1970 the crystal structures of pyrosilicates of rare earth elements with generic formula Ln_{2}Si_{2}O_{7}, where "Ln" stands for either one of lanthanum, cerium, neodymium, samarium, europium, gadolinium, dysprosium, holmium, yttrium, erbium, thulium, or ytterbium. They were found to belong to four distinct crystallographic classes, determined by the size of the cation. Other researchers also studied yttrium pyrosilicate Y_{2}Si_{2}O_{7}, gadolinium pyrosilicate Gd_{2}Si_{2}O_{7}, and scandium pyrosilicate Sc_{2}Si_{2}O_{7}.

== Preparation ==
Rare earth pyrosilicates Ln_{2}Si_{2}O_{7} can be obtained by fusing the corresponding oxide Ln_{2}O_{3} with silica in 1:2 molar ratio, Single crystals can be grown by the Verneuil process or the Czochralski method.

Industrial pyrosilicate can be produced by the depolymerisation of metasilicate by alkali, which releases water on breaking the Si−O−Si bond. This proceeds according to the idealised equation

2 SiO^{2−}_{3} + 2 OH^{−} → Si_{2}O^{6−}_{7} + H_{2}O

Additional alkali will degrade the bonds further, instead yielding orthosilicate.
