= Germanate =

Chemical compound

The orthogermanate anion

In chemistry, germanate is a compound containing an oxyanion of germanium. In the naming of inorganic compounds it is a suffix that indicates a polyatomic anion with a central germanium atom, for example potassium hexafluorogermanate, K_{2}GeF_{6}.

== Germanate oxy compounds ==
Germanium is similar to silicon forming many compounds with tetrahedral {GeO_{4}} units although it can also exhibit 5 and 6 coordination. Analogues of all the major types of silicates and aluminosilicates have been prepared. For example, the compounds Mg_{2}GeO_{4} (olivine and spinel forms), CaGeO_{3} (perovskite structure), Be_{2}GeO_{4} (phenakite structure) show the resemblance to the silicates. BaGe_{4}O_{9} has a complex structure containing 4 and 6 coordinate germanium. Germanates are important for geoscience as they possess similar structures to silicates and can be used as analogues for studying the behaviour of silicate minerals found in the Earth's mantle; for example, MnGeO_{3} has a pyroxene type structure similar to that of MgSiO_{3} which is a significant mineral in the mantle.

== Germanates in aqueous solutions ==
The alkali metal orthogermanates, M_{4}GeO_{4}, containing discrete GeO_{4}^{4−} ions, form basic solutions containing [Ge(OH)_{3}]^{−}, [GeO_{2}(OH)_{2}]^{2−} and [(Ge(OH)_{4})_{8}(OH)_{3}]^{3−}. Neutral solutions of germanium dioxide contain Ge(OH)_{4}, but at high pH germanate ions such as [Ge(OH)_{3}]^{−}, [GeO_{2}(OH)_{2}]^{2−} are present.

== Germanate zeolites ==
Microporous germanate zeolites were first prepared in the 1990s. A common method of preparation is hydrothermal synthesis using an organic amine as a template (structure determining agent). The frameworks are negatively charged due to extra oxide ions which leads to higher coordination numbers for germanium of 5 and 6. The negative charge is balanced by the positively charged amine molecules.

In addition to the ability of germanium to exhibit 4, 5 or 6 coordination, the greater length of the Ge–O bond in the {GeO_{4}} tetrahedral unit compared to Si–O in {SiO_{4}} and the narrower Ge–O–Ge angle (130°–140°) between corner shared tetrahedra allow for unusual framework structures. A zeolite reported in 2005 has large pores – 18.6 × 26.2 Å interconnected by channels defined by 30-membered rings (the naturally occurring zeolite faujasite with channels defined by 12-membered rings). Zeolites with frameworks containing silicon and germanium (silicogermanates), aluminium and germanium (aluminogermanates) and zirconium and germanium (zirconogermanates) are all known.

== See also ==
- Bismuth germanate (bismuth germanium oxide, BGO)
- Sodium germanate
