= Sodium germanate =

Names
- Other names sodium metagermanate

Identifiers
CAS Number	12025-19-3
3D model (JSmol)	Interactive image
ChemSpider	11214192
ECHA InfoCard	100.031.535
EC Number	234-703-0
PubChem CID	13783481
UNII	X7C1F92G4R
CompTox Dashboard (EPA)	DTXSID5020655
- InChI: InChI=1S/GeO3.2Na/c2-1(3)4;;/q-2;2*+1 Key: FNIHDXPFFIOGKL-UHFFFAOYSA-N
- SMILES: [O-][Ge](=O)[O-].[Na+].[Na+]

Properties
Chemical formula	Na_{2}GeO_{3}
Molar mass	166.62 g/mol
Appearance	white solid
Odor	odorless
Density	3.31 g/cm^{3}
Melting point	1,060 °C (1,940 °F; 1,330 K)
Solubility in water	14.4 g/100 mL (0 °C); 23.8 g/100 mL (25 °C)
Refractive index (n_{D})	1.59

Structure
Crystal structure	orthorhombic

Related compounds
Related compounds	Sodium silicate
- Except where otherwise noted, data are given for materials in their standard state (at 25 °C [77 °F], 100 kPa). Infobox references

Sodium germanate is an inorganic compound with the chemical formula Na_{2}GeO_{3}. It exists as a colorless solid. Sodium germanate is primarily used for the synthesis of other germanium compounds.

== Preparation and reactions ==
Sodium germanate can be prepared by the fusion of germanium oxide with sodium hydroxide at high temperatures:

2 NaOH + GeO_{2} → Na_{2}GeO_{3} + H_{2}O

An intermediate in this reaction is the protonated derivative NaHGeO_{3}, which is a water-soluble salt.

== Structure ==
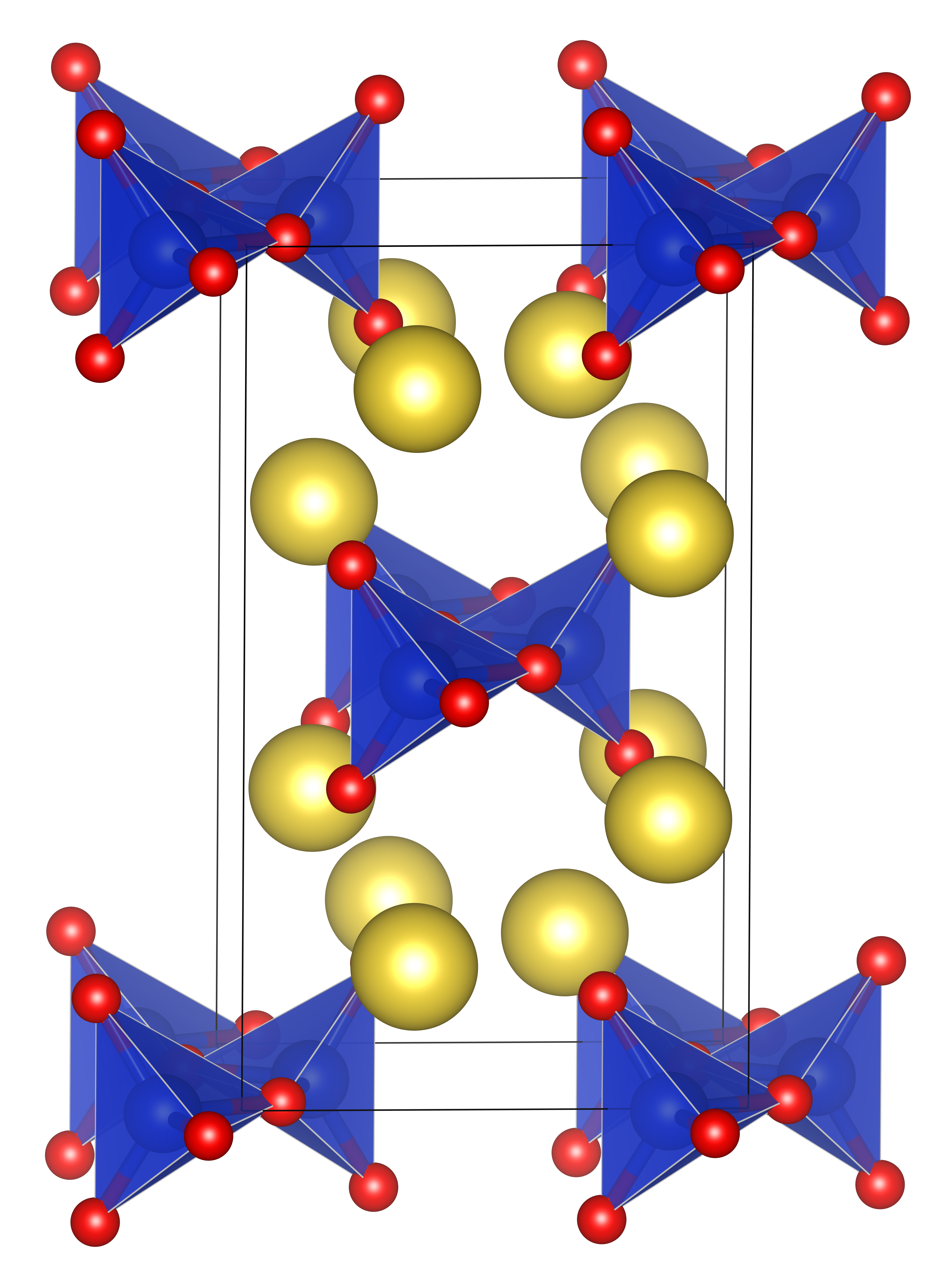
Structure of solid sodium germanate. (color scheme: red = O) Si resides at the center of the blue tetrahedra.

it is structurally analogous to sodium metasilicate, Na_{2}SiO_{3}, consisting of polymeric GeO_{3}^{2−} anions made up of vertex sharing {GeO_{4}} tetrahedra.

== See also ==
- Germanate
