= Lead metagermanate =

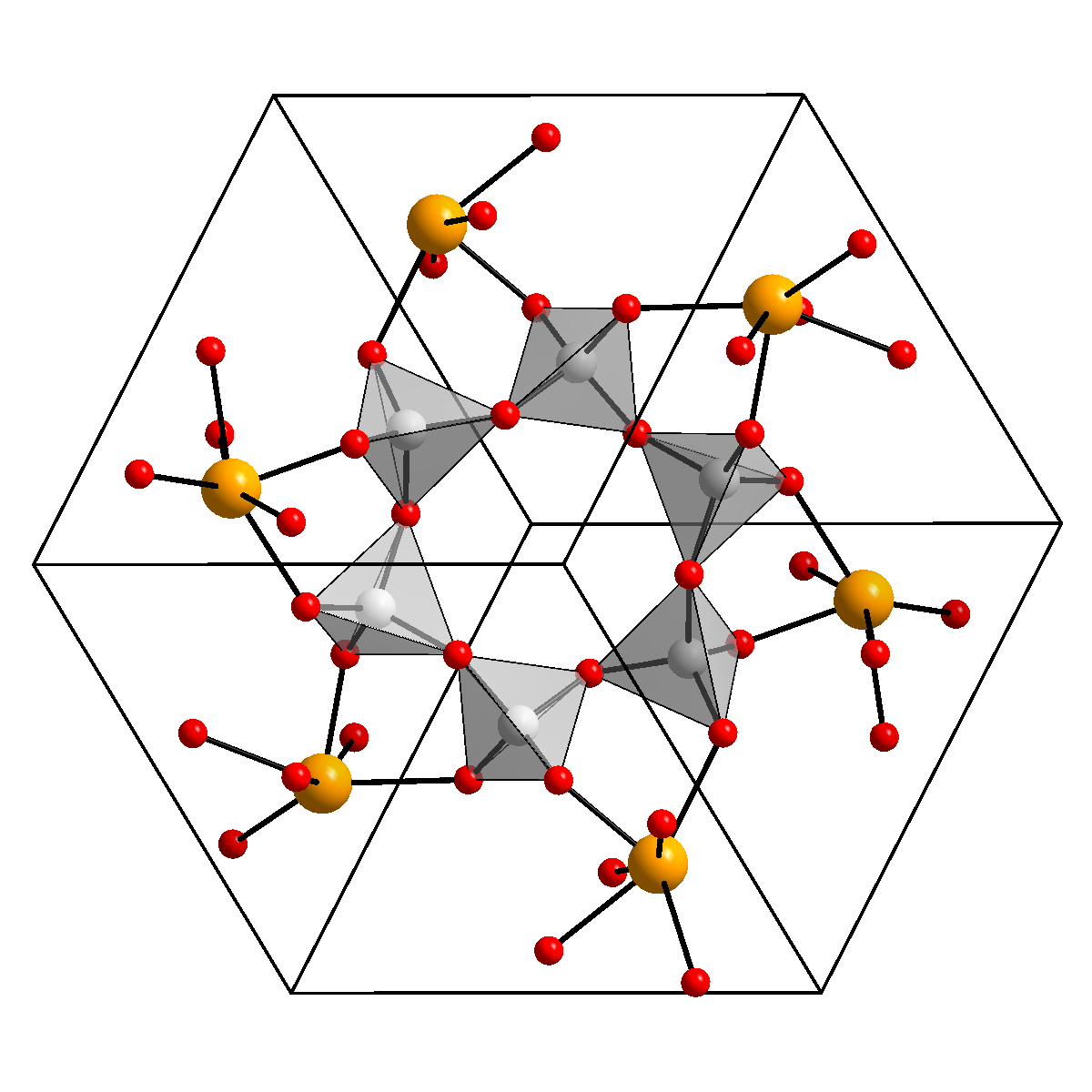

Identifiers
CAS Number	12025-27-3
3D model (JSmol)	Interactive image
ChemSpider	64886216
EC Number	235-666-3
PubChem CID	73357724
- InChI: InChI=1S/GeO3.Pb/c2-1(3)4;/q-2;+2 Key: XKENYNILAAWPFQ-UHFFFAOYSA-N
- SMILES: [Pb+2].[O-][Ge](=O)[O-]

Properties
Chemical formula	GeO_{3}Pb
Molar mass	327.8 g·mol^{−1}
Melting point	795 °C
- Except where otherwise noted, data are given for materials in their standard state (at 25 °C [77 °F], 100 kPa). Infobox references

Lead metagermante is one of the germanates of lead with the chemical formula of PbGeO_{3}. Other germanates include Pb_{5}Ge_{3}O_{11}.

== Preparation ==
Lead metagermanate can be obtained by the reaction of germanium dioxide and lead acetate.

== Properties ==
Lead metagermanate is a solid with a strong thermoelectric effect. It has two structural forms: the trigonal and the orthorhombic, with a transition temperature above 600 °C. Under high pressure, lead metagermanate can also form cubic crystals.
