= Geopolymer =

Polymeric Si–O–Al framework similar to zeolites but amorphous

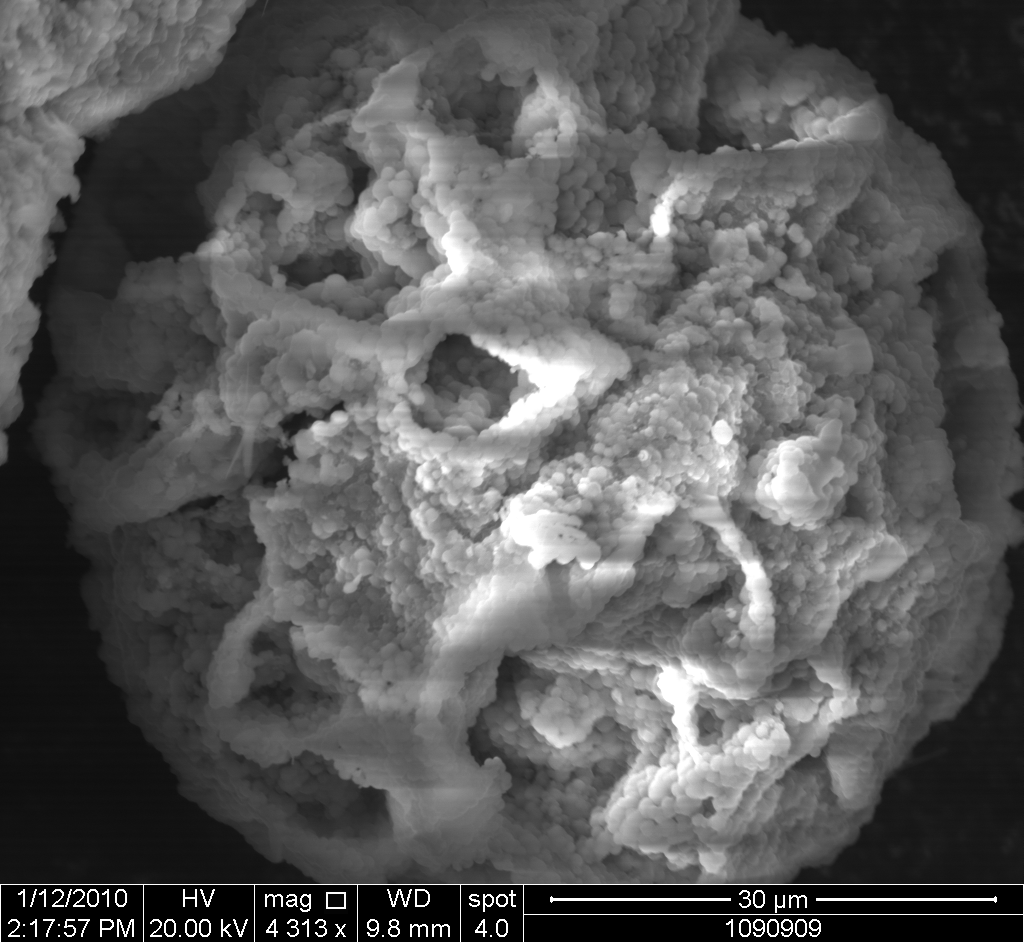
SEM image of a geopolymer granule prepared from metakaolin by alkaline activation to be further used as a sorbent.

A geopolymer is an inorganic, often ceramic-like material, that forms a stable, covalently bonded, non-crystalline to semi-crystalline network through the reaction of aluminosilicate materials with an alkaline or acidic solution. Many geopolymers may also be classified as alkali-activated cements or acid-activated binders. They are mainly produced by a chemical reaction between a chemically reactive aluminosilicate powder e.g. metakaolin or other clay-derived powders, natural pozzolan, or suitable glasses, and an aqueous solution (alkaline or acidic) that causes this powder to react and re-form into a solid monolith. The most common pathway to produce geopolymers is by the reaction of metakaolin with sodium silicate, which is an alkaline solution, but other processes are also possible.

The term geopolymer was coined by Joseph Davidovits in 1978 due to the rock-forming minerals of geological origin used in the synthesis process. These materials and associated terminology were popularized over the following decades via his work with the Institut Géopolymère (Geopolymer Institute).

Geopolymers are synthesized in one of two conditions:

- in alkaline medium (Na^{+}, K^{+}, Li^{+}, Cs^{+}, Ca^{2+}…)
- in acidic medium (phosphoric acid: H_{3}PO_{4})

The alkaline route is the most important in terms of research and development and commercial applications. Details on the acidic route have also been published.

Commercially produced geopolymers may be used for fire- and heat-resistant coatings and adhesives, medicinal applications, high-temperature ceramics, new binders for fire-resistant fiber composites, toxic and radioactive waste encapsulation, and as cementing components in making or repairing concretes. Due to the increasing demand for low-emission building materials, geopolymer technology is being developed as a lower-CO_{2} alternative to traditional Portland cement, with the potential for widespread use in concrete production. The properties and uses of geopolymers are being explored in many scientific and industrial disciplines such as modern inorganic chemistry, physical chemistry, colloid chemistry, mineralogy, geology, and in other types of engineering process technologies. In addition to their use in construction, geopolymers are utilized in resins, coatings, and adhesives for aerospace, automotive, and protective applications.

== Composition ==
In the 1950s, Viktor Glukhovsky developed concrete materials originally known as "soil silicate concretes" and "soil cements", but since the introduction of the geopolymer concept by Joseph Davidovits, the terminology and definitions of the word geopolymer have become more diverse and often conflicting. The word geopolymer is sometimes used to refer to naturally occurring organic macromolecules; that sense of the word differs from the now-more-common use of this terminology to discuss inorganic materials which can have either cement-like or ceramic-like character.

A geopolymer is essentially a mineral chemical compound or mixture of compounds consisting of repeating units, for example silico-oxide (-Si-O-Si-O-), silico-aluminate (-Si-O-Al-O-), ferro-silico-aluminate (-Fe-O-Si-O-Al-O-) or alumino-phosphate (-Al-O-P-O-), created through a process of geopolymerization. This method of describing mineral synthesis (geosynthesis) was first presented by Davidovits at an IUPAC symposium in 1976.

Even within the context of inorganic materials, there exist various definitions of the word geopolymer, which can include a relatively wide variety of low-temperature synthesized solid materials. The most typical geopolymer is generally described as resulting from the reaction between metakaolin (calcined kaolinitic clay) and a solution of sodium or potassium silicate (waterglass). Geopolymerization tends to result in a highly connected, disordered network of negatively charged tetrahedral oxide units balanced by the sodium or potassium ions.

In the simplest form, an example chemical formula for a geopolymer can be written as Na_{2}O·Al_{2}O_{3}·nSiO_{2}·wH_{2}O, where n is usually between 2 and 4, and w is around 11-15. Geopolymers can be formulated with a wide variety of substituents in both the framework (silicon, aluminium) and non-framework (sodium) sites; most commonly potassium or calcium takes on the non-framework sites, but iron or phosphorus can in principle replace some of the aluminum or silicon.

Geopolymerization usually occurs at ambient or slightly elevated temperature; the solid aluminosilicate raw materials (e.g. metakaolin) dissolve into the alkaline solution, then cross-link and polymerize into a growing gel phase, which then continues to set, harden, and gain strength.

== Geopolymer synthesis ==
=== Covalent bonding ===
The fundamental unit within a geopolymer structure is a tetrahedral complex consisting of silicon or aluminum coordinated through covalent bonds to four oxygens. The geopolymer framework results from the cross-linking between these tetrahedra, which leads to a 3-dimensional aluminosilicate network, where the negative charge associated with tetrahedral aluminium is balanced by a small cationic species, most commonly an alkali metal cation (Na+, K+ etc). These alkali metal cations are often ion-exchangeable, as they are associated with, but only loosely bonded to the main covalent network, similarly to the non-framework cations present in zeolites.

=== Oligomer formation ===
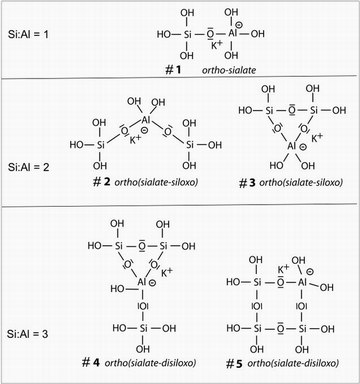
Five oligomer species named according to the sialate/siloxo nomenclature scheme

Geopolymerization is the process of combining many small molecules known as oligomers into a covalently bonded network. This reaction process takes place via formation of oligomers (dimer, trimer, tetramer, pentamer) which are believed to contribute to the formation of the actual structure of the three-dimensional macromolecular framework, either through direct incorporation or through rearrangement via monomeric species. These oligomers are named by some geopolymer chemists as sialates following the scheme developed by Davidovits, although this terminology is not universally accepted within the research community due in part to confusion with the earlier (1952) use of the same word to refer to the salts of the important biomolecule sialic acid.

The image shows five examples of small oligomeric potassium aluminosilicate species (labelled in the diagram according to the poly(sialate) / poly(sialate-siloxo) nomenclature), which are key intermediates in potassium-based aluminosilicate geopolymerization. The aqueous chemistry of aluminosilicate oligomers is complex, and plays an important role in the discussion of zeolite synthesis, a process which has many details in common with geopolymerization.

Example of geopolymerization of a metakaolin precursor, in an alkaline medium

The reaction process broadly involves four main stages:

- Alkaline hydrolysis of the layered structure of the calcined kaolinite
- Formation of monomeric and oligomeric species
- In the presence of waterglass (soluble potassium or sodium silicate), cyclic Al-Si structures can form (e.g. #5 in the figure), whereby the hydroxide is liberated by condensation reactions and can react again
- Geopolymerization (polycondensation) into polymeric 3D-networks.

The reaction processes involving other aluminosilicate precursors (e.g. low-calcium fly ash, crushed or synthetic glasses, natural pozzolans) are broadly similar to the steps described above.

=== Geopolymer 3D-frameworks and water ===
Example of a depiction of the 3D framework of a geopolymer, undergoing a dehydration and dehydroxylation process upon heating

Geopolymerization forms aluminosilicate frameworks that are similar to those of some rock-forming minerals, but lacking in long-range crystalline order, and generally containing water in both chemically bound sites (hydroxyl groups) and in molecular form as pore water. This water can be removed at temperatures above 100 – 200 °C. Cation hydration and the locations, and mobility of water molecules in pores are important for lower-temperature applications, such as in usage of geopolymers as cements. The figure shows a geopolymer containing both bound (Si-OH groups) and free water (left in the figure). Some water is associated with the framework similarly to zeolitic water, and some is in larger pores and can be readily released and removed. After dehydroxylation (and dehydration), generally above 250 °C, geopolymers can then crystallise above 800-1000 °C (depending on the nature of the alkali cation present).

== Commercial applications ==
There exists a wide variety of potential and existing applications. Some of the geopolymer applications are still in development, whereas others are already industrialized and commercialized. They are listed in three major categories:

=== Geopolymer cements and concretes ===
- Building materials (for example, clay bricks)
- Low-CO_{2} cements and concretes
- Radioactive and toxic waste containment

=== Geopolymer resins and binders ===
- Fire-resistant materials, thermal insulation, foams
- Low-energy ceramic tiles, refractory items, thermal shock refractories
- High-tech resin systems, paints, binders and grouts
- Bio-technologies (materials for medicinal applications)
- Foundry industry (resins), tooling for the manufacture of organic fiber composites
- Composites for infrastructure repair and strengthening
- Fire-resistant and heat-resistant high-tech carbon-fiber composites for aircraft interiors and automobiles

=== Arts and archaeology ===
- Decorative stone artifacts, arts and decoration
- Cultural heritage, archaeology and history of sciences

=== Research on geopolymers ===
In recent years, growing research attention has been directed toward geopolymers. The following are examples of recent studies:

- Application of dilute geopolymer suspensions as a wood modification (mineralisation) treatment

== Geopolymer cements ==
From a terminological point of view, geopolymer cement is a binding system that hardens at room temperature, like regular Portland cement.

List of the minerals, chemicals used for making geopolymer cements

Geopolymer cement is being developed and utilised as an alternative to conventional Portland cement for use in transportation, infrastructure, construction and offshore applications.

Production of geopolymer cement requires an aluminosilicate precursor material such as metakaolin or fly ash, a user-friendly alkaline reagent (for example, sodium or potassium soluble silicates with a molar ratio (MR) SiO_{2}:M_{2}O ≥ 1.65, M being sodium or potassium) and water (See the definition for "user-friendly" reagent below). Room temperature hardening is more readily achieved with the addition of a source of calcium cations, often blast furnace slag.

Geopolymer cements can be formulated to cure more rapidly than Portland-based cements; some mixes gain most of their ultimate strength within 24 hours. However, they must also set slowly enough that they can be mixed at a batch plant, either for pre-casting or delivery in a concrete mixer. Geopolymer cement also has the ability to form a strong chemical bond with silicate rock-based aggregates.

There is often confusion between the meanings of the terms 'geopolymer cement' and 'geopolymer concrete'. A cement is a binder, whereas concrete is the composite material resulting from the mixing and hardening of cement with water (or an alkaline solution in the case of geopolymer cement), and stone aggregates. Materials of both types (geopolymer cements and geopolymer concretes) are commercially available in various markets internationally.

=== Alkali-activated materials vs. geopolymer cements ===
There exists some confusion in the terminology applied to geopolymers, alkali-activated cements and concretes, and related materials, which have been described by a variety of names including also "soil silicate concretes" and "soil cements". Terminology related to alkali-activated materials or alkali-activated geopolymers is also in wide (but debated) use. These cements, sometimes abbreviated AAM, encompass the specific fields of alkali-activated slags, alkali-activated coal fly ashes, and various blended cementing systems.

=== User-friendly alkaline-reagents ===
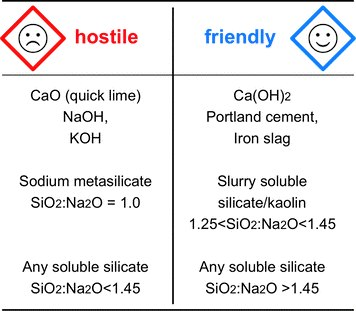
List of user-hostile and user-friendly chemical reagents

Geopolymerization uses chemical ingredients that may be dangerous and therefore requires some safety procedures. Material Safety rules classify the alkaline products in two categories: corrosive products (named here: hostile) and irritant products (named here: friendly).

The table lists some alkaline chemicals and their corresponding safety labels. Alkaline reagents belonging to the second (less elevated pH) class may also be termed as User-friendly, although the irritant nature of the alkaline component and the potential inhalation risk of powders still require the selection and use of appropriate personal protective equipment, as in any situation where chemicals or powders are handled.

The development of some alkali-activated-cements, as shown in numerous published recipes (especially those based on fly ashes) use alkali silicates with molar ratios SiO_{2}:M_{2}O below 1.20, or are based on concentrated NaOH. These conditions are not considered so user-friendly as when more moderate pH values are used, and require careful consideration of chemical safety handling laws, regulations, and state directives.

Conversely, geopolymer cement recipes employed in the field generally involve alkaline soluble silicates with starting molar ratios ranging from 1.45 to 1.95, particularly 1.60 to 1.85, i.e. user-friendly conditions. It may happen that for research, some laboratory recipes have molar ratios in the 1.20 to 1.45 range.

=== Examples of materials that are sometimes called geopolymer cements ===
Commercial geopolymer cements were developed in the 1980s, of the type (K,Na,Ca)-aluminosilicate (or "slag-based geopolymer cement") and resulted from the research carried out by Joseph Davidovits and J.L. Sawyer at Lone Star Industries, USA, marketed as Pyrament® cement. The US patent 4,509,985 was granted on April 9, 1985 with the title 'Early high-strength mineral polymer'.

In the 1990s, using knowledge of the synthesis of zeolites from fly ashes, Wastiels et al., Silverstrim et al. and van Jaarsveld and van Deventer developed geopolymeric fly ash-based cements.

Materials based on siliceous (EN 197), also called class F (ASTM C618), fly ashes are known:

- alkali-activated fly ash geopolymer:

In many (but not all) cases requires heat curing at 60-80°C; not manufactured separately as a cement, but rather produced directly as a fly-ash based concrete. NaOH + fly ash: partially-reacted fly ash particles embedded in an alumino-silicate gel with Si:Al= 1 to 2, zeolitic type (chabazite-Na and sodalite) structures.

- slag/fly ash-based geopolymer cement:

Room-temperature cement hardening. Alkali metal silicate solution + blast furnace slag + fly ash: fly ash particles embedded in a geopolymeric matrix with Si:Al ~ 2. Can be produced with "user-friendly" (not extremely high pH) activating solutions.

The properties of iron-containing "ferri-sialate"-based geopolymer cements are similar to those of rock-based geopolymer cements but involve geological elements, or metallurgical slags, with high iron oxide content. The hypothesised binder chemistry is (Ca,K)-(Fe-O)-(Si-O-Al-O).

Rock-based geopolymer cements can be formed by the reaction of natural pozzolanic materials under alkaline conditions, and geopolymers derived from calcined clays (e.g. metakaolin) can also be produced in the form of cements.

=== CO_{2} emissions during manufacturing ===
Geopolymer cements can be designed to have lower attributed CO_{2} emissions compared to other widely used materials such as ordinary Portland cement. Geopolymers use industrial byproducts/waste containing aluminosilicate phases in manufacturing, which minimizes CO_{2} emissions and therefore have a lower global warming potential (GWP). However, emissions still arise from various stages of production of geopolymer concretes. The extraction and processing of raw materials, such as fly ash, slag, or metakaolin, require energy and contribute to CO_{2} emissions, though they are often industrial by-products with a lower environmental impact than clinker production in Portland concrete. A significant source of emissions in geopolymer concrete manufacturing is the production of alkali activators like sodium hydroxide (NaOH) and sodium silicate, which require high-temperature processing and contribute to the overall global warming potential. Additionally, energy consumption during mixing, transportation, and curing, especially when elevated temperatures are used, can further contribute to emissions. While studies suggest that geopolymer concrete can reduce global warming potential by up to 64% compared to Portland concrete through material selection and optimized activator use, the overall impact depends on the specific composition and processing methods employed.

While geopolymer concrete generally has a lower global warming potential (GWP) than ordinary Portland concrete, its environmental impact varies based on the choice of raw materials and activators. In particular, the production of alkali activators like sodium hydroxide plays a crucial role in determining the overall sustainability of geopolymer concrete. A life cycle assessment (LCA) study by Salas et al. (2018) shows that sodium hydroxide production is a major factor in the environmental impact of geopolymer concrete, as it is also essential for sodium silicate production. The energy mix used in its production significantly influences emissions, with a 2018 mix (85% hydroelectricity) reducing impacts by 30–70% compared to a 2012 mix (62% hydroelectricity). The source of sodium hydroxide also affects geopolymer concrete's sustainability, with solar salt-based production and hydropower reducing its GWP by 64% compared to conventional concrete (CC). However, geopolymer concrete has higher ozone depletion potential due to CFC emissions from the chlor-alkali process, a drawback not present in CC production. Other environmental impacts vary, with geopolymer concrete slightly outperforming CC in fossil fuel depletion and eutrophication but performing slightly worse in acidification and photochemical oxidant formation.

=== The need for standards ===
In June 2012, the institution ASTM International organized a symposium on Geopolymer Binder Systems. The introduction to the symposium states: When performance specifications for Portland cement were written, non-portland binders were uncommon...New binders such as geopolymers are being increasingly researched, marketed as specialty products, and explored for use in structural concrete. This symposium is intended to provide an opportunity for ASTM to consider whether the existing cement standards provide, on the one hand, an effective framework for further exploration of geopolymer binders and, on the other hand, reliable protection for users of these materials.

The existing Portland cement standards are not adapted to geopolymer cements; they must be elaborated by an ad hoc committee. Yet, to do so requires the presence of standard geopolymer cements. Presently, every expert is presenting their own recipe based on local raw materials (wastes, by-products or extracted). There is a need for selecting the right geopolymer cement category. The 2012 State of the Geopolymer R&D, suggested to select two categories, namely:

- type 2 slag/fly ash-based geopolymer cement: fly ashes are available in the major emerging countries;
- ferro-sialate-based geopolymer cement: this geological iron-rich raw material is present in all countries throughout the globe.

along with the appropriate user-friendly geopolymeric reagent.

=== Health effects ===
Similarly to the Environmental Impacts, the production of geopolymer concrete has some notable human health implications, primarily due to the use of alkaline activators such as sodium hydroxide (NaOH) and sodium silicate (Na₂SiO₃). These chemicals are highly caustic and can cause severe skin burns, respiratory issues, and eye damage if not handled properly. Additionally, the manufacturing of NaOH and Na₂SiO₃ contributes to greenhouse gas emissions and releases pollutants linked to human toxicity and ozone depletion. Fly ash and silica fume, commonly used in geopolymer concrete, also pose risks when not properly managed, as fine particulate matter from these materials can contribute to dust pollution and respiratory diseases. However, geopolymer concrete can still provide environmental and health benefits by diverting industrial byproducts from landfills and reducing the hazardous emissions associated with traditional cement production. In addition, the selection of certain precursors and alkaline activators can minimize the health risks associated with geopolymer concrete production.

== Geopolymers as ceramics ==
Geopolymers can be used as a low-cost and/or chemically flexible route to ceramic production, both to produce monolithic specimens, and as the continuous (binder) phase in composites with particulate or fibrous dispersed phases.

=== Room-temperature processed materials ===
Geopolymers produced at room temperature are typically hard, brittle, castable, and mechanically strong. This combination of characteristics offers the opportunity for their usage in a variety of applications in which other ceramics (e.g. porcelain) are conventionally used. Some of the first patented applications of geopolymer-type materials - actually predating the coining of the term geopolymer by multiple decades - relate to use in automobile spark plugs.

=== Thermal processing of geopolymers to produce ceramics ===
It is also possible to use geopolymers as a versatile pathway to produce crystalline ceramics or glass-ceramics, by forming a geopolymer through room-temperature setting, and then heating (calcining) it at the necessary temperature to convert it from the crystallographically disordered geopolymer form to achieve the desired crystalline phases (e.g. leucite, pollucite and others).

== Geopolymer applications in arts and archaeology ==
Because geopolymer artifacts can look like natural stone, several artists started to cast in silicone rubber molds replicas of their sculptures. For example, in the 1980s, the French artist Georges Grimal worked on several geopolymer castable stone formulations.

=== Egyptian pyramid stones ===
In the mid-1980s, Joseph Davidovits presented his first analytical results carried out on samples sourced from Egyptian pyramids. He claimed that the ancient Egyptians used a geopolymeric reaction to make re-agglomerated limestone blocks. Later on, several materials scientists and physicists took over these archaeological studies and have published results on pyramid stones, claiming synthetic origins. However, the theories of synthetic origin of pyramid stones have also been stridently disputed by other geologists, materials scientists, and archaeologists.

=== Roman cements ===
It has also been claimed that the Roman lime-pozzolan cements used in the building of some important structures, especially works related to water storage (cisterns, aqueducts), have chemical parallels to geopolymeric materials.

== See also ==
- Zeolite
