= Sodium pyrosilicate =

Names
- Other names hexasodium diorthosilicate

Identifiers
CAS Number	15593-82-5
3D model (JSmol)	Interactive image
EC Number	239-671-1
PubChem CID	61803
UNII	VNJ6H8MB6Z
- InChI: InChI=1S/6Na.O7Si2/c;;;;;;1-8(2,3)7-9(4,5)6/q6*+1;-6 Key: PMYUVOOOQDGQNW-UHFFFAOYSA-N
- SMILES: [Si](O[Si]([O-])([O-])[O-])([O-])([O-])[O-].[Na+].[Na+].[Na+].[Na+].[Na+].[Na+]

Properties
Chemical formula	Na_{6}O_{7}Si_{2}
Molar mass	306.102 g·mol^{−1}
Density	2.615 g·cm^{−3}

Structure
Crystal structure	triclinic
Space group	P1̅
Lattice constant	a = 5.8007 Å, b = 11.5811 Å, c = 23.157 Å α = 89.709°, β = 88.915°, γ = 89.004°
Lattice volume (V)	1555.1 Å^{3}
Formula units (Z)	8 units per cell

Related compounds
Other anions	Sodium orthosilicate; Sodium metasilicate
- Except where otherwise noted, data are given for materials in their standard state (at 25 °C [77 °F], 100 kPa). (what is ?) Infobox references

Sodium pyrosilicate is the chemical compound Na_{6}Si_{2}O_{7}. It is one of the sodium silicates, specifically a pyrosilicate, formally a salt of the unstable pyrosilicic acid H_{6}Si_{2}O_{7}.

== Structure ==
The anhydrous solid has the triclinic crystal structure. The Si_{2}O^{6−}_{7} anions are arranged in layers parallel to the (100) plane, with the sodium cations distributed in 24 distinct crystallographic positions, coordinated by 4 to 6 near oxygen atoms. Some of the 4-coordinated sodium atoms can be interpreted as parallel columns of edge-sharing NaO_{4} tetrahedra. The columnar arrangement forms tunnels that house the remaining sodium cations. Twinning at a microscopic scale simulates a much larger monoclinic C centered lattice (V′ = 6220 Å^{3}, Z = 32).
