= Orthosilicate =

Anion SiO4–4, or any of its salts and esters

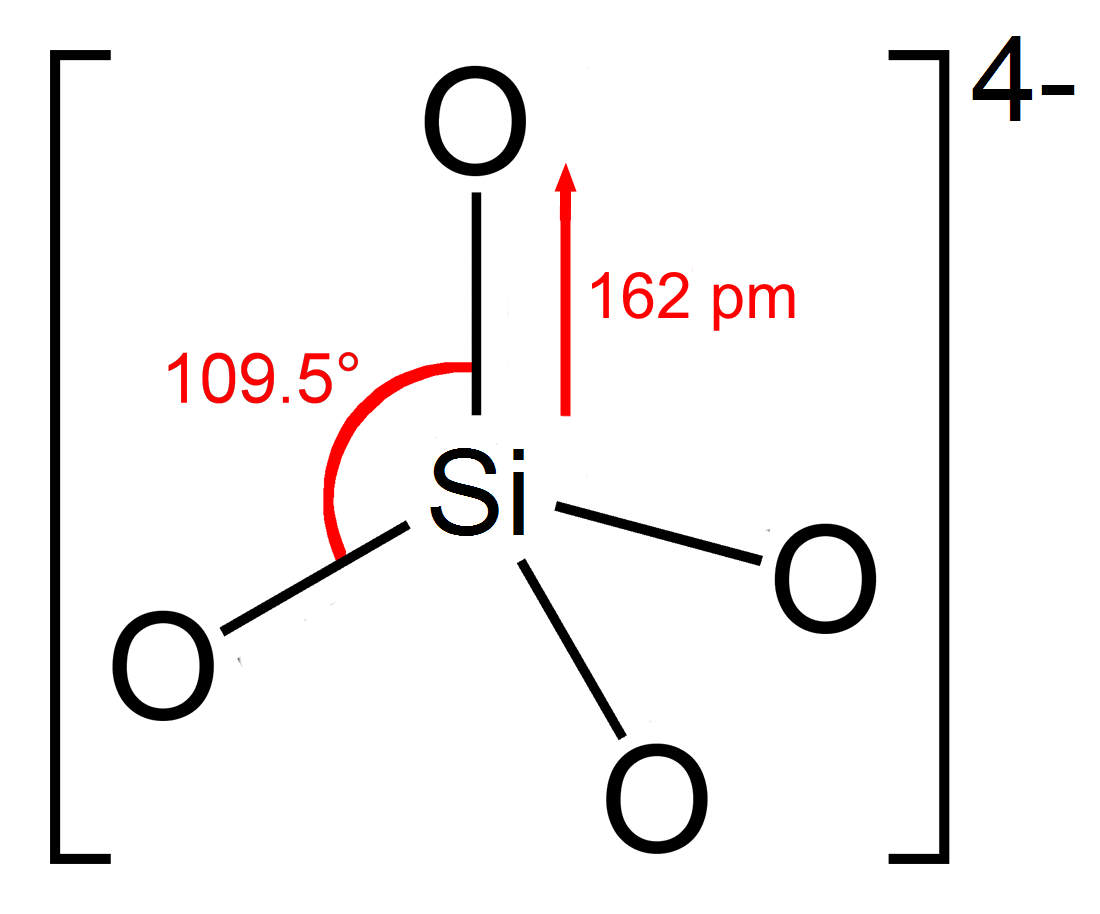
Structure of the anion

In chemistry, orthosilicate is the anion SiO^{4−}_{4}, or any of its salts and esters. It is one of the silicate anions. It is occasionally called the silicon tetroxide anion or group.

Orthosilicate salts, like sodium orthosilicate, are stable, and occur widely in nature as silicate minerals, being the defining feature of the nesosilicates. Olivine, a magnesium or iron(II) orthosilicate, is the most abundant mineral in the upper mantle.

The orthosilicate anion is a strong base, the conjugate base of the extremely weak orthosilicic acid H_{4}SiO_{4} (pK_{a2} = 13.2 at 25 °C). This equilibrium is difficult to study since the acid tends to decompose into a hydrated silica condensate.

== Structure ==
The orthosilicate ion or group has tetrahedral shape, with one silicon atom surrounded by four oxygen atoms.

In the anion, each oxygen carries a unit negative charge. The Si–O bond is 162 pm long.

In organic compounds like tetramethyl orthosilicate, each oxygen is formally neutral and is connected to the rest of the molecule by a single covalent bond.

== Uses ==
Europium doped barium orthosilicate (Ba_{2}SiO_{4}) is a common phosphor used in green light-emitting diodes (LEDs). Phosphor for blue LEDs can be made with strontium doped barium orthosilicate. Barium orthosilicate is a major cause of cathode poisoning in vacuum tubes. Orthosilicate is also a precursor to mesoporous silicate materials.

== Organic chemistry ==
Although very important in inorganic chemistry and geochemistry, the orthosilicate ion is rarely seen in organic chemistry. Two silicate compounds, however, are used in organic synthesis: tetraethyl orthosilicate or TEOS is used to link polymers, and is especially important in the manufacture of aerogels. Tetramethyl orthosilicate or TMOS is used as an alternative to TEOS, and also has a number of other uses as a reagent. TEOS is preferred over TMOS as TMOS decomposes to produce high concentrations of toxic methanol. Inhaling TMOS can result in toxic build-up of silica in the lungs.
