= Pyrosilicic acid =

Silicic acid with the formula (HO)3–Si–O–Si–(OH)3

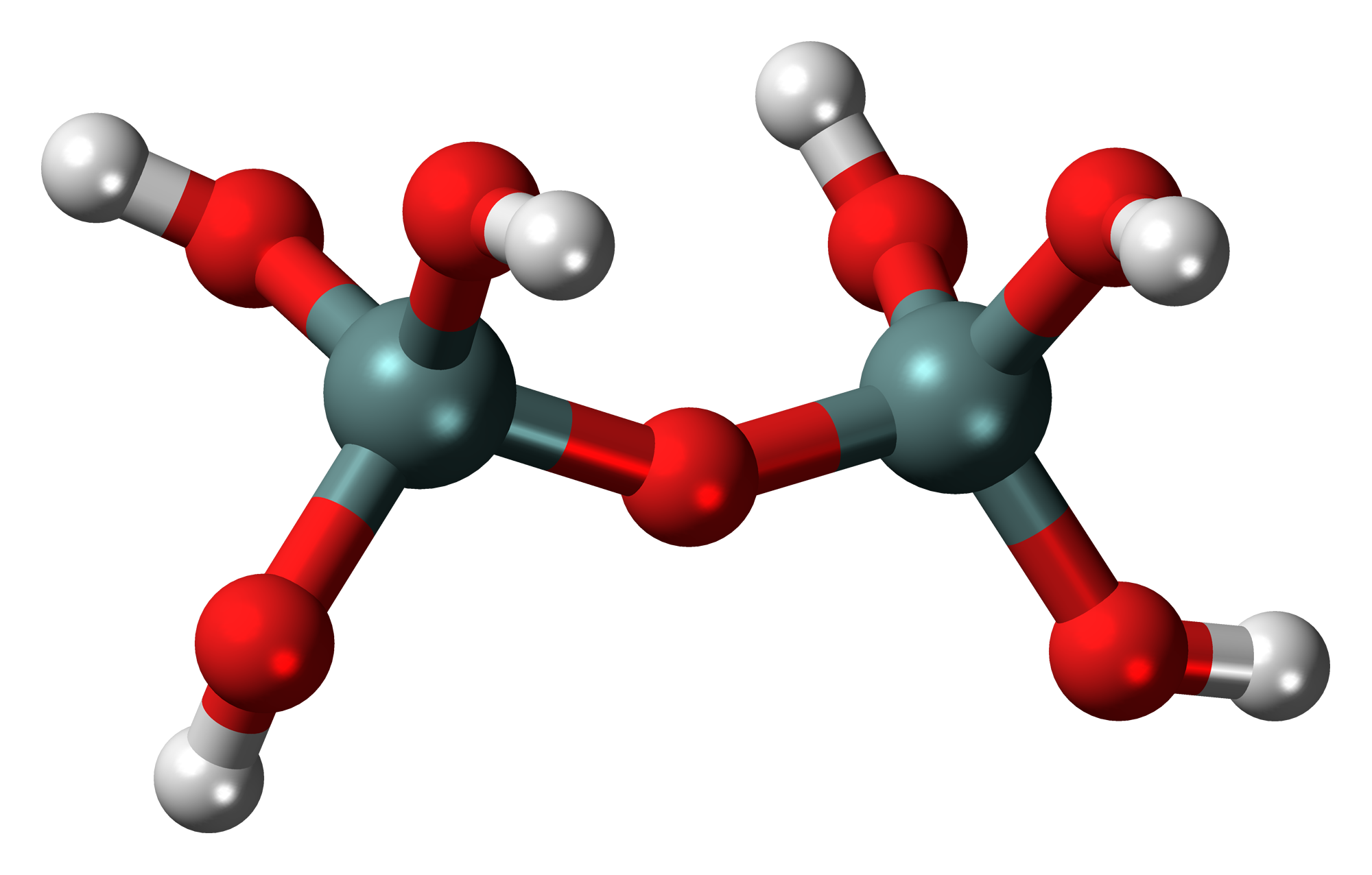
- Pyrosilicic acid

Names
- IUPAC name Trihydroxysilyl trihydrogen orthosilicate
- Other names disilicic acid

Identifiers
CAS Number	20638-18-0
3D model (JSmol)	Interactive image
ChEBI	CHEBI:29292
ChemSpider	55684
Gmelin Reference	26937
PubChem CID	61804
CompTox Dashboard (EPA)	DTXSID201014501
- InChI: InChI=1S/H6O7Si2/c1-8(2,3)7-9(4,5)6/h1-6H Key: KDJOAYSYCXTQGG-UHFFFAOYSA-N
- SMILES: O[Si](O)(O)O[Si](O)(O)O

Properties
Chemical formula	H_{6}O_{7}Si_{2}
Molar mass	174.211 g·mol^{−1}
Conjugate base	Pyrosilicate
- Except where otherwise noted, data are given for materials in their standard state (at 25 °C [77 °F], 100 kPa). (what is ?) Infobox references

Pyrosilicic acid is the chemical compound with formula H_{6}Si_{2}O_{7} or (HO)_{3}SiOSi(OH)_{3}. It is one of the silicic acids and has pyrosilicate as its conjugate base.

It was synthesized, using nonaqueous solutions, in 2017.

H_{6}Si_{2}O_{7}(aq) → 2 SiO_{2}(s) + 3 H_{2}O

Pyrosilicic acid may be present in sea water and other natural waters at very low concentration. Compounds formally derived from it, such as sodium pyrosilicate, are found in the sorosilicate minerals.
