= Calcium aluminosilicate =

Identifiers
CAS Number	37342-39-5
3D model (JSmol)	Interactive image
ChemSpider	32698750
ECHA InfoCard	100.048.597
EC Number	253-476-9
E number	E556 (acidity regulators, ...)
PubChem CID	56843091
UNII	98139KV0X6
- InChI: InChI=1S/2Al.Ca.2O4Si/c;;;2*1-5(2,3)4/q2*+3;+2;2*-4 Key: GWWPLLOVYSCJIO-UHFFFAOYSA-N
- SMILES: [O-][Si]([O-])([O-])[O-].[O-][Si]([O-])([O-])[O-].[Al+3].[Al+3].[Ca+2]

Properties
Chemical formula	CaAl_{2}Si_{2}O_{8}
- Except where otherwise noted, data are given for materials in their standard state (at 25 °C [77 °F], 100 kPa). Infobox references

Calcium aluminosilicate is an aluminosilicate compound containing calcium cations, most commonly with the chemical formula CaAl_{2}Si_{2}O_{8}. In minerals, as a feldspar, it can be found as anorthite, an end-member of the plagioclase series.

== Uses ==
As a food additive, it is sometimes designated E556. The FDA recognizes it as an anti-caking agent for table salt when used at levels below 2% by weight, and as an ingredient in vanilla powder.
