= Silicic acid =

Any molecule containing Si=O and Si–OH groups

In chemistry, a silicic acid (/sɪˈlɪsɪk/) is any chemical compound containing the element silicon attached to oxide (=O) and hydroxyl (−OH) groups, with the general formula [H_{2x}SiO_{x+2}]_{n} or, equivalently, [SiO_{x}(OH)_{4−2x}]_{n}. Orthosilicic acid is a representative example. Silicic acids are not observed in isolation, but are thought to exist in aqueous solutions, including seawater, and play a role in biomineralization. They are typically colorless weak acids that are sparingly soluble in water. Depending on the number of silicon atoms present, there are mono- and polysilicic (di-, tri-, tetrasilicic, etc.) acids. Like the silicate anions, which are their better known conjugate bases, silicic acids are proposed to be oligomeric or polymeric. Monomeric silicic acids are primarily of theoretical interest, since they have never been identified in a well-defined form characterized by X-ray crystallography.

== Examples ==
Formula	Name	Computed Structure
H_{4}SiO_{4} or Si(OH)_{4}	orthosilicic acid	
H_{2}SiO_{3} or SiO(OH)_{2}	metasilicic acid	
H_{6}Si_{2}O_{7} or O(Si(OH)_{3})_{2}	pyrosilicic acid	
H_{2}Si_{2}O_{5} or Si_{2}O_{3}(OH)_{2}	disilicic acid	

== Reactions ==
Silicic acids can be seen as hydrated forms of silica, namely 2 H_{2x}SiO_{x+2} = SiO_{2}·(H_{2}O)_{x}. Indeed, in concentrated solutions, silicic acids generally polymerize and condense, and ultimately degrade to silicon dioxide and water. The intermediate stages may be very thick liquids or gel-like solids. Dehydrating the latter yields a hard translucent form of silica with atomic-scale pores, called silica gel, which is widely used as water absorbent and drying agent.

Silica dissolves very sparingly in water and is present in seawater at concentrations below 100 parts per million. In such dilute solutions, silica is assumed to exist as orthosilicic acid. Theoretical computations indicate that the dissolution of silica in water proceeds through the formation of a SiO_{2}·2H_{2}O complex and then orthosilicic acid.

The silicon–oxygen double bond of metasilicic acid, implied by the formula H_{2}SiO_{3}, is hypothetical or highly unstable. Such double bonds can be hydrated to a pair of hydroxyl (−OH) groups:

$$\ce{=Si=O + H2O <-> =Si(-OH)2}$$

For example,

$$\ce{\overset{metasilicic\ acid}{H2SiO3} + H2O <-> \overset{orthosilicic\ acid}{H4SiO4}}$$

or

$$\ce{\overset{disilicic\ acid}{H2Si2O5} + 2 H2O <-> \overset{pyrosilicic\ acid}{(HO)3Si-O-Si(OH)3}}$$

Alternatively, metasilicic acid is liable to form cyclic polymers [−SiO(OH)_{2}−]_{n}, which can be opened by hydration to chain polymers HO[−SiO(OH)_{2}−]_{n}H. Similarly, disilicic acid is liable to form complex polymers with a tetravalent unit, [=Si_{2}O_{3}(OH)_{2}=]_{n}. Conversely, oligomeric and polymeric acids may depolymerize by hydrolysis of the Si−O−Si bridges, or such bridges may be created by condensation:

$$\ce{#Si-O-Si# + H2O <-> #Si-OH + HO-Si#}$$

Like organic silanols, silicic acids are weak acids. Orthosilicic acid has calculated dissociation potentials pK_{a_{1}} = 9.84, pK_{a_{2}} = 13.2 at 25 °C.

Silicic acids and silicates in solution react with molybdate anions, yielding yellow silicomolybdate complexes. This reaction has been used to titrate the content of silicon in water solutions and determine their nature. In a typical preparation, monomeric orthosilicic acid was found to react completely in 75 seconds, dimeric pyrosilicic acid in 10 minutes, and higher oligomers in considerably longer time. The reaction is not observed with colloidal silica.

The degree of polymerization of silicic acids in water solution can be determined by its effect on the freezing point of the solution (cryoscopy).

== History ==
Silicic acid was invoked by Jöns Jacob Berzelius in the early 19th century to explain the dissolution of silicon dioxide (silica, quartz) in water, namely through the hydration reaction:

$$\ce{\overset{silica}{SiO2} + \overset{water}{H2O} <-> \overset{silicic\ acid}{H2SiO3}}$$

Based on the vapor pressure curves for silica gel, Reinout Willem Van Bemmelen argued that no silica hydrates existed, only silica gel. On the other hand, Gustav Tschermak von Seysenegg believed that he had observed different silicic acids as decomposition products of natural silicate gels.

The first crystalline silicic acid was prepared from the phyllosilicate natrosilite (Na_{2}Si_{2}O_{5}) in 1924. More than 15 crystalline acids are known and comprise at least six modifications of H_{2}Si_{2}O_{5}. Some acids can adsorb and intercalate organic molecules, and therefore are interesting alternatives to silica.

== Preparation ==
Crystalline silicic acids can be prepared by removing the sodium cations from solutions of sodium silicates with an ion-exchange resin, or by treating sodium silicates with concentrated sulfuric acid.

== See also ==
- Boric acid
