= Sodium orthosilicate =

Chemical compound

- Chemical structure of sodium orthosilicate

Names
- IUPAC name Tetrasodium silicate
- Other names Sodium orthosilicate

Identifiers
| CAS Number | 13472-30-5 |
| 3D model (JSmol) | Interactive image |
| ChemSpider | 24265 |
| ECHA InfoCard | 100.033.387 |
| EC Number | 236-741-3 |
| PubChem CID | 26051 |
| UNII | TEU2JIC5PA |
| UN number | 1759 |
| CompTox Dashboard (EPA) | DTXSID6065501 |
- InChI: InChI=1S/4Na.O4Si/c;;;;1-5(2,3)4/q4*+1;-4 Key: POWFTOSLLWLEBN-UHFFFAOYSA-N; InChI=1S/4Na.O4Si/c;;;;1-5(2,3)4/q4*+1;-4 Key: POWFTOSLLWLEBN-UHFFFAOYSA-N
- SMILES: [O-][Si]([O-])([O-])[O-].[Na+].[Na+].[Na+].[Na+]

Properties
| Chemical formula | Na_{4}O_{4}Si |
| Molar mass | 184.040 g·mol^{−1} |
| Appearance | White powder |
| Melting point | 1,018 °C (1,864 °F; 1,291 K) |

Hazards
- GHS labelling
| Pictograms | (GHS05: Corrosive) (GHS07: Exclamation mark) |
| Signal word | Danger |
| Hazard statements | H302, H314, H335 |
| Precautionary statements | P260, P301+P330+P331, P303+P361+P353, P305+P351+P338, P405, P501 |

Related compounds
| Other anions | Sodium metasilicate; Sodium pyrosilicate |
- Except where otherwise noted, data are given for materials in their standard state (at 25 °C [77 °F], 100 kPa). (what is ?) Infobox references

Sodium orthosilicate is the chemical compound with the molecular formula Na_{4}SiO_{4}. It is one of the sodium silicates, specifically an orthosilicate, formally a salt of the unstable orthosilicic acid H_{4}SiO_{4}.

== Uses ==
Sodium orthosilicate has been considered as an interfacial tension reducing additive in the waterflooding of oil fields for enhanced oil extraction. In laboratory settings, it was found to be more effective than sodium hydroxide for some types of oil.

Sodium orthosilicate has been found to stabilize ferrate films as an anticorrosion treatment of iron and steel surfaces.

== Natural occurrence ==
Sodium orthosilicate has not been found to occur in nature. However, the mineral chesnokovite, chemically the related salt disodium dihydrogen orthosilicate Na_{2}SiO_{2}(OH)_{2}·8H_{2}O, was identified in the Kola Peninsula in 2007.
