= Metasilicate =

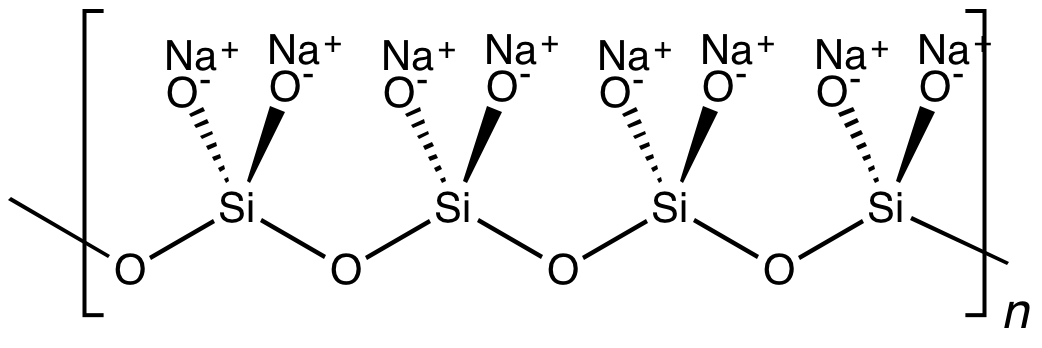
Idealized structure of sodium metasilicate.

Metasilicates are silicates containing ions of empirical formula SiO^{2−}_{3}. Common stoichiometries include M^{I}_{2}SiO_{3} and M^{II}SiO_{3}. Metasilicates can be cyclic, usually the hexamer (SiO_{3})^{12−}_{6}, or chains, (SiO_{3})^{2−}_{n}.

Common containing metasilicate anion are:

- Inosilicates
- Metasilicic acid (hydrogen metasilicate)
- Sodium metasilicate
- Calcium metasilicate

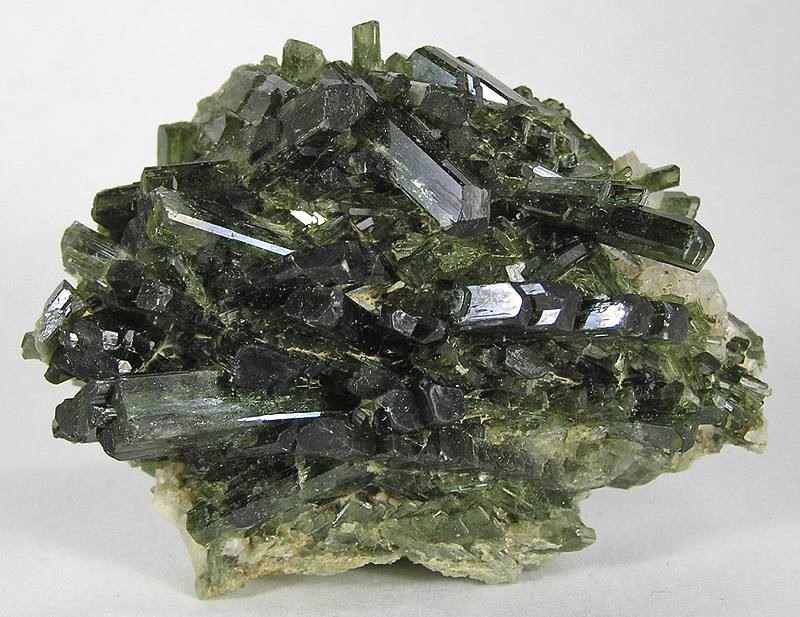
Pyroxene (diopside) is a mineral classified as a metasilicate.
