= Metasilicic acid =

Hypothetical chemical compound with formula H2SiO3

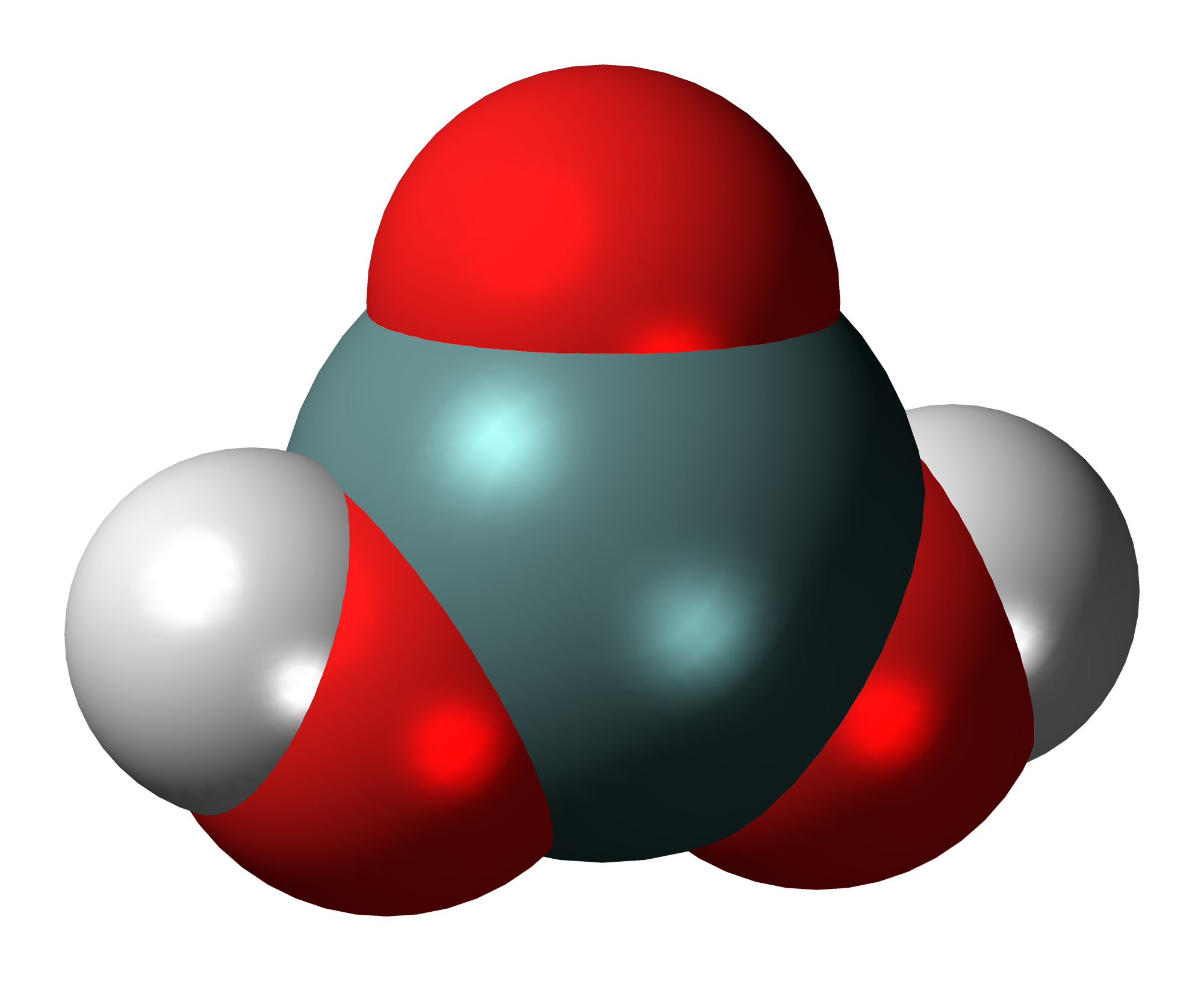

Names
- IUPAC name Metasilicic acid
- Other names Silicic acid

Identifiers
CAS Number	7699-41-4
3D model (JSmol)	Interactive image
ChEMBL	ChEMBL2068408
ChemSpider	14236
ECHA InfoCard	100.028.834
EC Number	231-716-3
PubChem CID	14768
UNII	4OI8D3YOH1
CompTox Dashboard (EPA)	DTXSID30872499
- InChI: InChI=1S/H2O3Si/c1-4(2)3/h1-2H Key: IJKVHSBPTUYDLN-UHFFFAOYSA-N
- SMILES: O[Si](=O)O

Properties
Chemical formula	H_{2}O_{3}Si
Molar mass	78.098 g·mol^{−1}
Conjugate base	Metasilicate

Hazards
- GHS labelling
Pictograms	(GHS07: Exclamation mark)
Signal word	Warning
Hazard statements	H319, H335
Precautionary statements	P261, P264, P271, P280, P304+P340, P305+P351+P338, P312, P337+P313, P403+P233, P405, P501
- Except where otherwise noted, data are given for materials in their standard state (at 25 °C [77 °F], 100 kPa). (what is ?) Infobox references

Metasilicic acid is a hypothetical chemical compound with formula (HO)_{2}SiO. The free acid slowly polymerises in aqueous solution even at low concentrations and cannot be isolated under normal conditions. Compounds including the conjugate base are known as metasilicates and occur widely in nature as inosilicates.

== See also ==
- Orthosilicic acid
