= Sodium metasilicate =

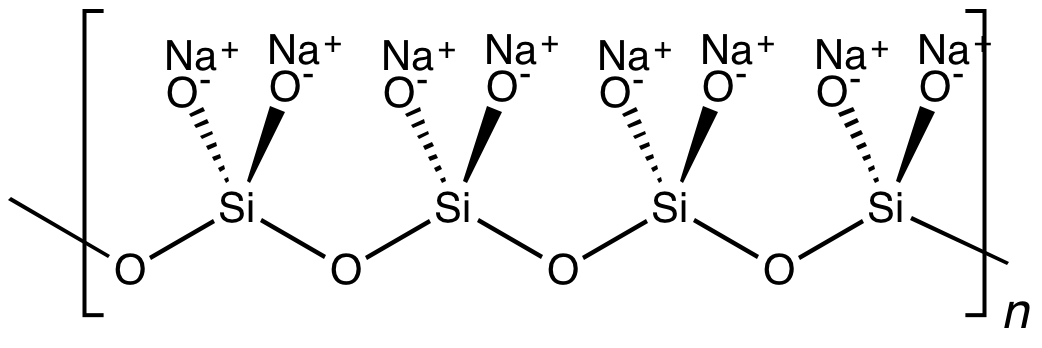
- Structural formula of polymeric sodium silicate

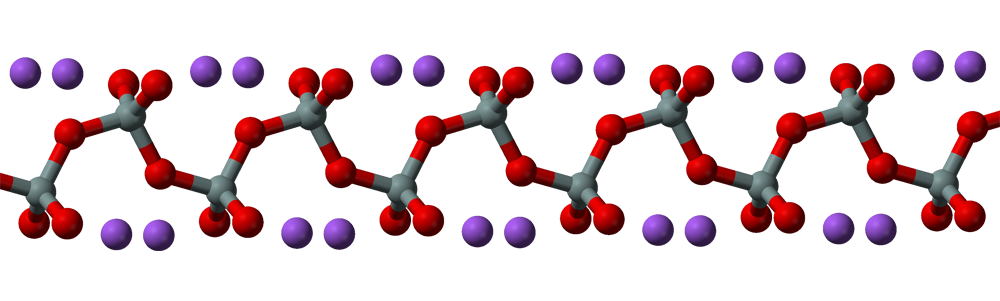
- Ball and stick model of polymeric sodium silicate

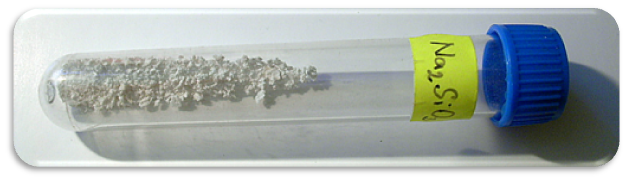
- Sample of sodium silicate in a vial

Names
- IUPAC name Sodium metasilicate

Identifiers
CAS Number	6834-92-0; pentahydrate: 10213-79-3; nonahydrate: 13517-24-3
3D model (JSmol)	Interactive image
Abbreviations	E550
ChEBI	CHEBI:60720
ChemSpider	21758
ECHA InfoCard	100.027.193
EC Number	600-279-4229-912-9
MeSH	Sodium+metasilicate
PubChem CID	23266; pentahydrate: 61495; nonahydrate: 61639
RTECS number	VV9275000
UNII	052612U92L; nonahydrate: D8D44215LZ
UN number	1759 3253
CompTox Dashboard (EPA)	DTXSID7029669
- InChI: InChI=1S/2Na.O3Si/c;;1-4(2)3/q2*+1;-2 Key: NTHWMYGWWRZVTN-UHFFFAOYSA-N; InChI=1/2Na.O3Si/c;;1-4(2)3/q2*+1;-2 Key: NTHWMYGWWRZVTN-UHFFFAOYAB
- SMILES: [Na+].[Na+].[O-][Si]([O-])=O

Properties
Chemical formula	Na_{2}SiO_{3}
Molar mass	122.062 g·mol^{−1}
Appearance	White crystals
Density	2.61 g/cm^{3}
Melting point	1,088 °C (1,990 °F; 1,361 K)
Solubility in water	22.2 g/100 ml (25 °C); 160.6 g/100 ml (80 °C)
Solubility	insoluble in alcohol
Refractive index (n_{D})	1.52

Thermochemistry
Heat capacity (C)	111.8 J/(K·mol)
Std molar entropy (S^{⦵}_{298})	113.71 J/(K·mol)
Std enthalpy of formation (Δ_{f}H^{⦵}_{298})	−1561.43 kJ/mol
Gibbs free energy (Δ_{f}G^{⦵})	−1427 kJ/mol

Hazards
- GHS labelling
Pictograms	(GHS05: Corrosive) (GHS07: Exclamation mark)
Signal word	Danger
Hazard statements	H302, H314, H315, H319, H335
Precautionary statements	P260, P264, P270, P271, P280, P301+P312, P301+P330+P331, P302+P352, P303+P361+P353, P304+P340, P305+P351+P338, P310, P312, P321, P330, P332+P313, P337+P313, P362, P363, P403+P233, P405, P501
NFPA 704 (fire diamond)	2 0 0
- Lethal dose or concentration (LD, LC)
LD_{50} (median dose)	1153 mg/kg (rat, oral)
Safety data sheet (SDS)	Avantor Performance Materials

Related compounds
Other anions	Sodium orthosilicate; Sodium pyrosilicate
Other cations	Potassium metasilicate
- Except where otherwise noted, data are given for materials in their standard state (at 25 °C [77 °F], 100 kPa). verify (what is ?) Infobox references

Sodium metasilicate is the chemical substance with formula Na_{2}SiO_{3}, which is the main component of commercial sodium silicate solutions. It is an ionic compound consisting of sodium cations Na^{+} and the polymeric metasilicate anions [–SiO^{2−}_{3}–]_{n}. It is a colorless crystalline hygroscopic and deliquescent solid, soluble in water (giving an alkaline solution) but not in alcohols.

== Structure ==
In the anhydrous solid, the metasilicate anion is actually polymeric, consisting of corner-shared {SiO_{4}} tetrahedra, and not a discrete SiO_{3}^{2−} ion.

In addition to the anhydrous form, there are hydrates with the formula Na_{2}SiO_{3}·nH_{2}O (where n = 5, 6, 8, 9), which contain the discrete, approximately tetrahedral anion SiO_{2}(OH)_{2}^{2−} with water of hydration. For example, the commercially available sodium silicate pentahydrate Na_{2}SiO_{3}·5H_{2}O is formulated as Na_{2}SiO_{2}(OH)_{2}·4H_{2}O, and the nonahydrate Na_{2}SiO_{3}·9H_{2}O is formulated as Na_{2}SiO_{2}(OH)_{2}·8H_{2}O.

== Preparation ==
The anhydrous compound can be prepared by fusing silicon dioxide SiO_{2} (silica, quartz) with sodium oxide Na_{2}O in 1:1 molar ratio.

== Uses ==
Sodium metasilicate reacts with acids to produce silica gel.

- Cements and Binders - dehydrated sodium metasilicate forms cement or binding agent.
- Pulp and Par - sizing agent and buffer/stabilizing agent when mixed with hydrogen peroxide.
- Soaps and Detergents - as an emulsifying and suspension agent.
- Automotive applications - decommissioning of old engines (CARS program), cooling system sealant, exhaust repair.
- Egg Preservative - seals eggs increasing shelf life.
- Crafts - forms "stalagmites" by reacting with and precipitating metal ions. Also used as a glue called "soluble glass".
- Hair coloring kits
