= Joseph Davidovits =

French materials scientist

- Born: 23 March 1935
- Citizenship: French
- Education: University of Mainz
- Known for: Geopolymer
- Scientific career
- Fields: Materials science, Organic chemistry
- Website: www.davidovits.info

Joseph Davidovits (born 23 March 1935) is a French materials scientist. He posited that the blocks of the Great Pyramid are not carved stone but mostly a form of limestone concrete or man-made stone.

== Limestone concrete hypothesis ==
Davidovits believes that the blocks of the pyramid are not carved stone, but mostly a form of limestone concrete and that they were "cast" as with modern concrete. According to this hypothesis, soft limestone with a high kaolinite content was quarried in the wadi on the south of the Giza Plateau. The limestone was then dissolved in large, Nile-fed pools until it became a watery slurry. Lime (found in the ash of cooking fires) and natron (also used by the Egyptians in mummification) were mixed in. The pools were then left to evaporate, leaving behind a moist, clay-like mixture. This wet "concrete" would be carried to the construction site where it would be packed into reusable wooden moulds and in a few days would undergo a chemical reaction similar to the curing of concrete. New blocks, he suggests, could be cast in place, on top of and pressed against the old blocks. Proof-of-concept tests using similar compounds were carried out at a geopolymer institute in northern France and it was found that a crew of five to ten, working with simple hand tools, could agglomerate a structure of five, 1.3 to 4.5 ton blocks in a couple of weeks. He also claims that the Famine Stele, along with other hieroglyphic texts, describe the technology of stone agglomeration.

Davidovits's method is not accepted by the academic mainstream. His method does not explain the granite stones, weighing well over 10 tons, above the King's Chamber, which he agrees were carved. Geologists have carefully scrutinized Davidovits's suggested technique and concluded his concrete came from natural limestone quarried in the Mokattam Formation. However, Davidovits alleges that the bulk of the soft limestone came from the same natural Mokkatam Formation quarries found by geologists, and insists that ancient Egyptians used the soft marly layer instead of the hard layer to re-agglomerate stones.

Davidovits's hypothesis gained support from Michel Barsoum, a materials science researcher. Michel Barsoum and his colleagues at Drexel University published their findings supporting Davidovits's hypothesis in the Journal of the American Ceramic Society in 2006. Using scanning electron microscopy, they discovered in samples of the limestone pyramid blocks mineral compounds and air bubbles that according to him do not occur in natural limestone.

Dipayan Jana, a petrographer, made a presentation to the ICMA (International Cement Microscopy Association) in 2007 and gave a paper in which he discusses Davidovits's and Barsoum's work and concludes "we are far from accepting even as a remote possibility a 'man-made' origin of pyramid stones."

== See also ==
- Great Pyramids of Giza
- Pyramids
- Egyptian pyramid construction techniques

== Bibliography ==
- Davidovits, Joseph (1983). Alchemy and the Pyramids. Saint Quentin, France: Geopolymer Institute.
- Davidovits, Joseph (2002). Ils ont Bâti les Pyramides: Les Prouesses Technologiques des Anciens Egyptiens. Paris: J.-C. Godefroy.
- Davidovits, Joseph (2005). La Bible avait raison, Tome 1: L'archéologie révèle l'existence des Hébreux en Égypte. Paris: J.-C. Godefroy.
- Davidovits, Joseph (2006). La Bible avait raison, Tome 2: sur les traces de Moïse et de l'Exode. Paris: J.-C. Godefroy.
- Davidovits, Joseph (2006). La nouvelle histoire des pyramides. Paris: J.-C. Godefroy.
- Davidovits, Joseph (2008). Geopolymer Chemistry and Applications. Saint Quentin, France: Geopolymer Institute.
- Davidovits, Joseph (2009). De cette fresque naquit la Bible. Paris: J.-C. Godefroy.
- Davidovits, Joseph (2009). Why the Pharaohs Built the Pyramids with Fake Stones. Saint Quentin, France: Geopolymer Institute.
