= Marine Tanguy =

French art entrepreneur

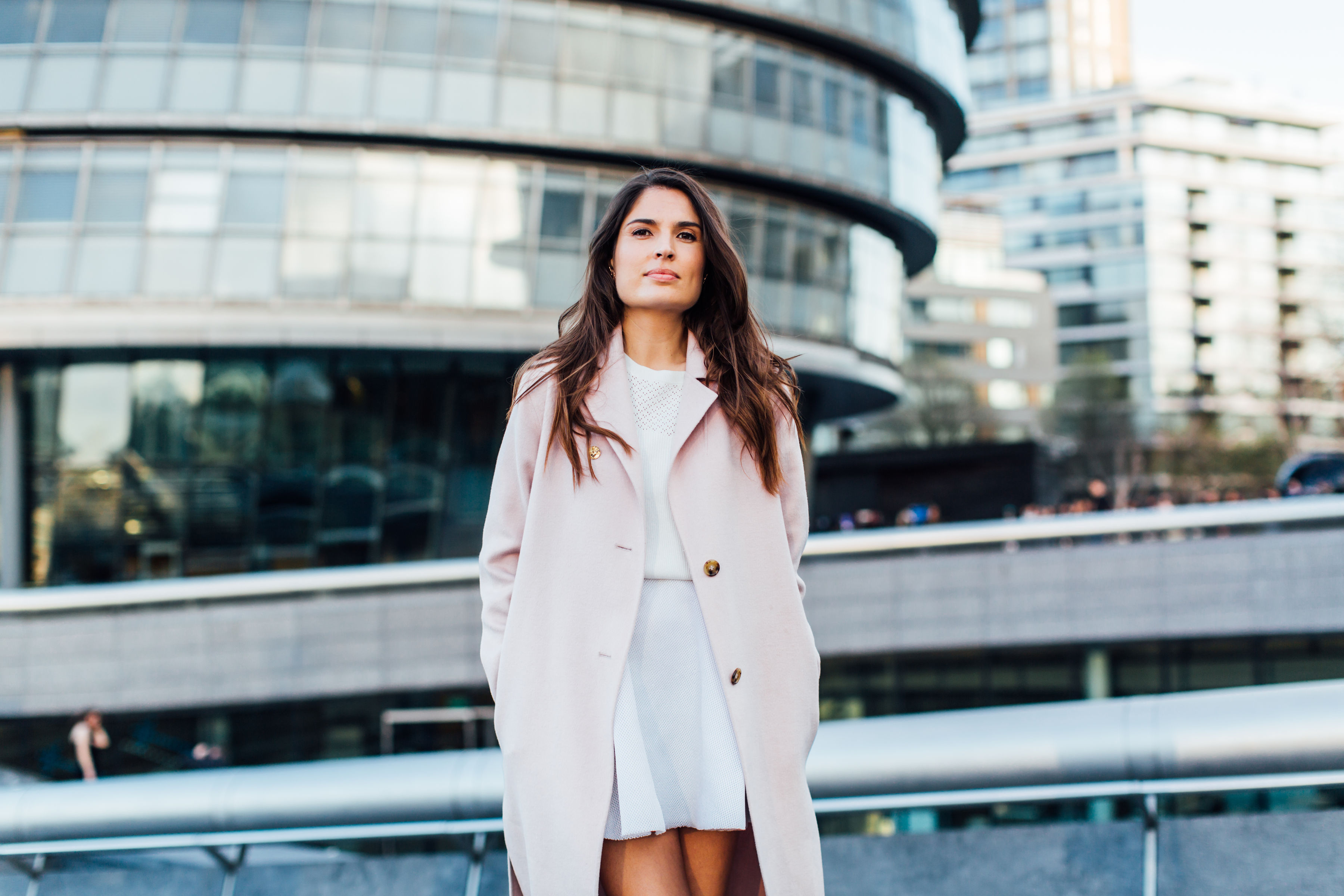
- Born: 5 July 1989 (age 37); Île de Ré
- Organization: MTArt Agency
- Children: 2
- Awards: Forbes 30 Under 30 (2018)
- Website: https://mtart.agency/

Marine Tanguy (born 5 July 1989) is a French art entrepreneur and author who is the founder and CEO of MTArt Agency.

== Early life and career ==
Tanguy was born on the French island of Île de Ré. Her mother is a primary school teacher and her father a sports teacher on the Island.

At the age of 21 Tanguy managed her first gallery, the Outsider's Gallery, in London's Soho district. Tanguy, who was two years into an art history degree at the University of Warwick at the time, dropped out of the course to take up the role. The Outsider's Gallery was founded by Steve Lazarides, the gallerist who discovered many of the top street artists such as Banksy and Invader.

Two years later in April 2014 Tanguy, along with investor Steph Sebbag, opened the De Re Gallery in Los Angeles.

== MTArt Agency ==
In June 2015, Tanguy founded MTArt Agency. MTArt Agency was the first talent agency dedicated to visual artists.

MTArt covers their artists' studio costs, sells their works, implement cultural & commercial partnerships and offers their artists press exposure. In return, MTArt Agency gains commission on each piece the artist sells, and artists give one piece of art to the agency's private collection each year.

According to MTArt, the agency reviews 200 portfolios of up-and-coming artists every month, with the value of the selected artists' works growing on average 150% in value year-on-year. MTArt Agency currently has offices in London and Paris.

In July 2022, MTArt was listed on The Times100 as one of the top 100 fastest-growing companies in the UK. Investors include Frédéric Jousset, Saul Klein and Todd Ruppert of T. Rowe Price.

In October 2022, an article in Le Monde detailed that several former employees accused Tanguy of concealed work, tax fraud, customs fraud and moral harassment. Previous controversies include Tanguy fraudulently claiming to be a graduate of the University of Cambridge.

== Visual Detox ==
In March 2024, Tanguy released The Visual Detox: How to Consume Media Without Letting It Consume You, published by Penguin and SquarePeg. The Visual Detox explains how the imagery we see shapes our wellbeing. She aims to give us new tools to think critically about images, combat information overload and participate more in the visual world around us by engaging with the art and content that improves our day-to-day experiences online, at work, in our homes and in public spaces.

== Personal projects ==
Tanguy is a member of the Thousand Network, the Creative Industries Federation and The Association of Women in the Arts. Tanguy also serves as a young patron of the V&A Museum and has been appointed Fellow of the Royal Society of Arts.

Tanguy has delivered three TedX talks; on how to transform cities with art (2017), on how social media visuals affects our minds (2018), and on how harmful are the visual biases we see daily? (2024).

In 2018 Tanguy was a recipient of Forbes 30 under 30 Europe: Art and Culture. In 2019 she won the Demeter Award at the NatWest everywoman awards.

== Personal life ==
Tanguy lives in London and has two sons with her partner William McQuillan.
