= Potassium silicate =

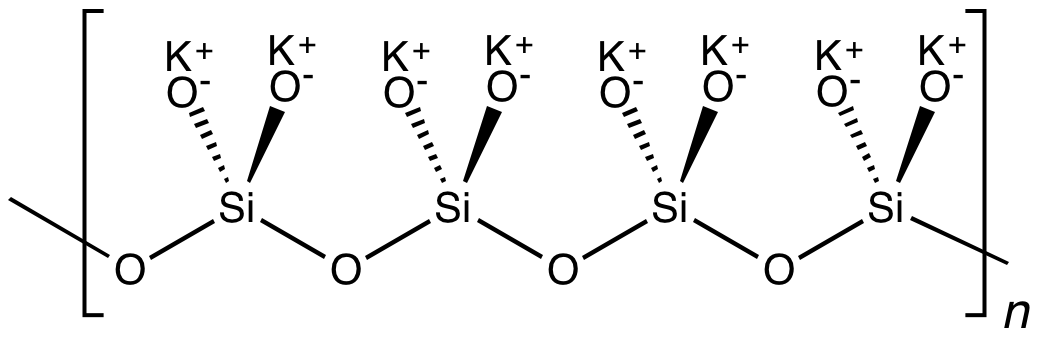

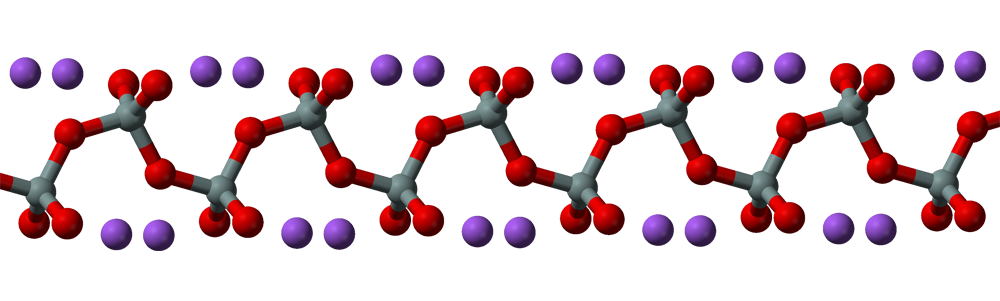

Names
- Preferred IUPAC name Potassium metasilicate
- Other names Liquid glass Waterglass

Identifiers
CAS Number	1312-76-1
3D model (JSmol)	Interactive image
ChemSpider	59585
ECHA InfoCard	100.029.989
EC Number	233-001-1
E number	E560 (acidity regulators, ...)
PubChem CID	66200
UNII	J86L1GUL6K
CompTox Dashboard (EPA)	DTXSID20893092
- InChI: InChI=1S/2K.O3Si/c;;1-4(2)3/q2*+1;-2 Key: NNHHDJVEYQHLHG-UHFFFAOYSA-N; InChI=1/2K.O3Si/c;;1-4(2)3/q2*+1;-2 Key: NNHHDJVEYQHLHG-UHFFFAOYAP
- SMILES: [K+].[K+].[O-][Si]([O-])=O

Properties
Chemical formula	K_{2}O_{3}Si
Molar mass	154.279 g·mol^{−1}
Appearance	White crystals

Hazards
- GHS labelling
Pictograms	(GHS05: Corrosive) (GHS07: Exclamation mark)
Signal word	Danger
Hazard statements	H314, H335
Precautionary statements	P260, P264, P271, P280, P301+P330+P331, P303+P361+P353, P304+P340, P305+P351+P338, P310, P312, P321, P363, P403+P233, P405, P501
NFPA 704 (fire diamond)	1 0 0

Related compounds
Other anions	Potassium carbonate Potassium germanate Potassium stannate Potassium plumbate
Other cations	Sodium silicate
- Except where otherwise noted, data are given for materials in their standard state (at 25 °C [77 °F], 100 kPa). verify (what is ?) Infobox references

Potassium silicate is the name for a family of inorganic compounds. The most common potassium silicate has the formula K_{2}SiO_{3}, samples of which contain varying amounts of water. These are white solids or colorless solutions.

== Synthesis, structure, reactions ==
Potassium silicate can be synthesized in the laboratory by treating silica with potassium hydroxide, according to this idealized equation:

nSiO_{2} + 2 KOH → K_{2}O·nSiO_{2} + H_{2}O

These solutions are highly alkaline. Addition of acids causes the reformation of silica.

K_{2}SiO_{3} adopts a chain or cyclic structures with interlinked SiO^{2−}_{3} monomers. Each Si is tetrahedral.

== Uses ==
=== Woodwork protection against fire ===
Impregnation of wood with a potassium silicate solution is an easy and low-cost way for rendering the woodwork of houses secure against catching fire. The woodwork is first saturated with a diluted and nearly neutral solution of potash silicate. After drying, one or two coats of a more concentrated solution are usually applied.

=== Horticulture ===
In horticulture, potassium silicate is used as a soluble source of potassium and silica. It makes the growing medium more alkaline.

It is also used as a supplement (in conjunction with normal fertilizer) for the numerous benefits that increasing the availability of silicon compounds has. Silicon-containing compounds are valuable to a plant, and serve to support the plant. Stems thicken, the plant becomes more tolerant to drought and resists wilting, and the plant gets larger leaves and fruit (because the stem can support more weight). The thicker cell walls of the plant also provides an added mechanical resistance to sap-sucking insects (e.g. spider mite) and various pathogenic fungi (e.g. powdery mildew).

=== Industrial uses ===
Some metal cleaning formulations use potassium silicate, which also serves as a corrosion inhibitor. It also finds various uses in the fabrication of Shielded metal arc welding rods and cosmetics.

=== Silicon dioxide production ===
Potassium silicate may also be employed in glass recycling as an intermediate step in obtaining relatively pure and cheap SiO_{2} for further processing (e.g. for fused glass).

== Safety ==
Potassium silicate is strongly alkaline.

== See also ==
- Sodium silicate
- Silica gel
