= Aluminosilicate =

Mineral with elements Al, Si and O

Aluminosilicate refers to materials containing anionic Si-O-Al linkages. Commonly, the associate cations are sodium (Na^{+}), potassium (K^{+}) and Hydrogen (H^{+}). Such materials occur as minerals, coal combustion products and as synthetic materials, often in the form of zeolites. Both synthetic and natural aluminosilicates are of technical significance as structural materials, catalysts, and reagents.

== Important representatives ==
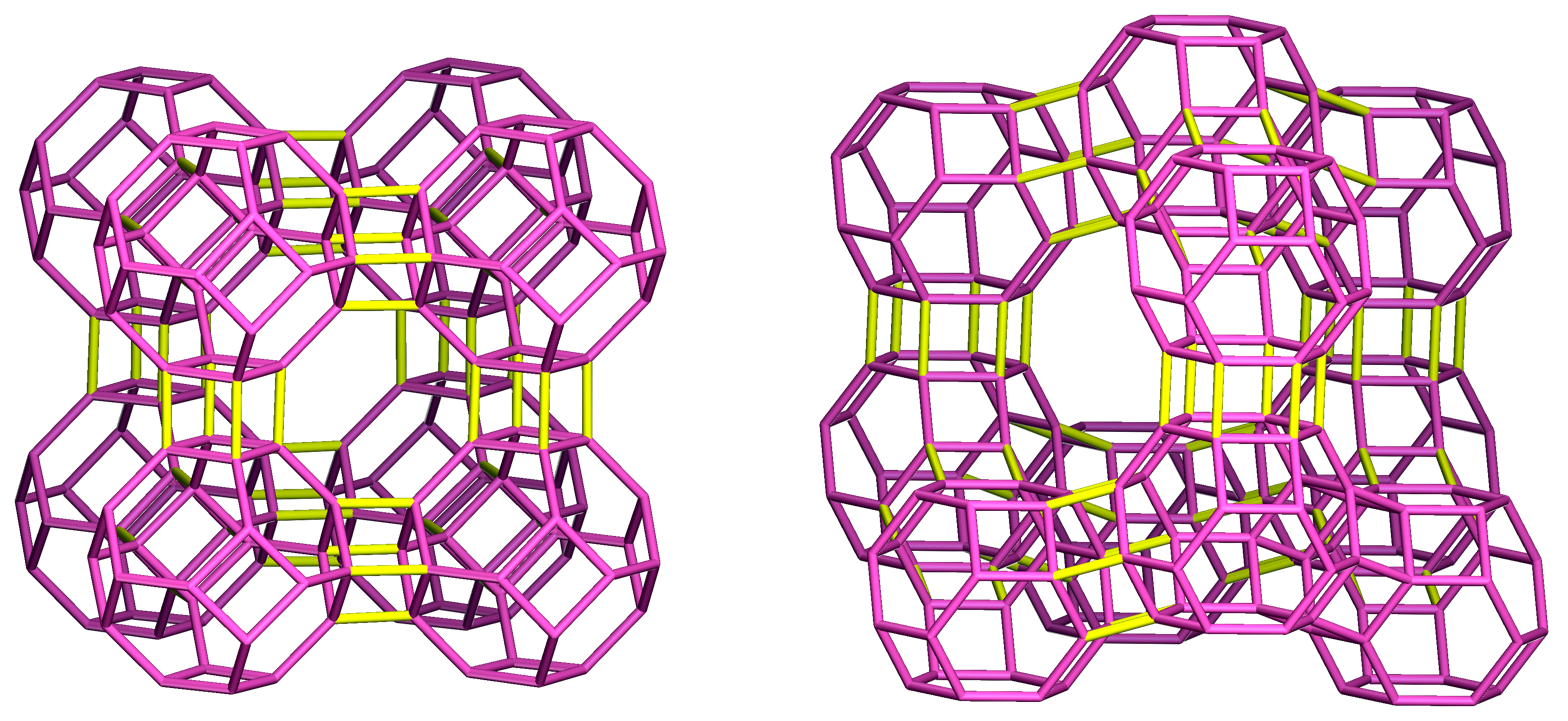
The aluminosilicate framework of LTA-type zeolite (left) and FAU-type zeolite (right). Vertices = Al or Si, oxygen atoms are not shown.

Feldspar is a common tectosilicate aluminosilicate mineral made of potassium, sodium, and calcium cations surrounded by a negatively charged network of silicon, aluminium and oxygen atoms.

Many aluminosilicates are synthesized by reactions of silicates, aluminates, and other compounds. They have the general formula (MAlO_{2})(SiO_{2})_{x}(H_{2}O)_{y} where M^{+} is usually H^{+} and Na^{+}. The Si/Al ratio is variable, which provides a means to tune the properties. Many of these materials are porous and exhibit properties of industrial value. Naturally occurring microporous, hydrous aluminosilicate minerals are also referred to as zeolites.

== See also ==
- Aluminium silicate
- Geopolymer cement
- Silicate minerals
- Calcium aluminosilicate
- Sodium aluminosilicate
- Gorilla Glass – a type of aluminosilicate glass
