= Sodium silicate =

Hygroscopic chemical compound of variable Na2O/SiO2 ratio precursor of waterglass

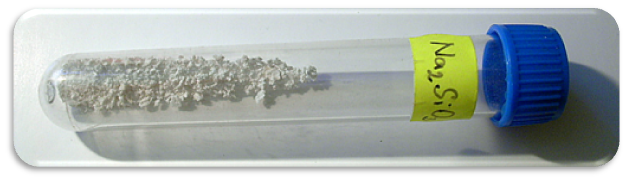
Na_{2}SiO_{3}

Sodium silicate is a generic name for chemical compounds with the formula Na_{2x}Si_{y}O_{2y+x} or (Na_{2}O)_{x}·(SiO_{2})_{y}, such as sodium metasilicate (Na_{2}SiO_{3}), sodium orthosilicate (Na_{4}SiO_{4}), and sodium pyrosilicate (Na_{6}Si_{2}O_{7}). The anions are often polymeric. These compounds are generally colorless transparent solids or white powders, and soluble in water in various amounts.

Sodium silicate is also the technical and common name for a mixture of such compounds, chiefly the metasilicate, also called waterglass, water glass, or liquid glass. The product has a wide variety of uses, including the formulation of cements, coatings, passive fire protection, textile and lumber processing, manufacture of refractory ceramics, as adhesives, and in the production of silica gel. The commercial product, available in water solution or in solid form, is often greenish or blue owing to the presence of iron-containing impurities.

In industry, the various grades of sodium silicate are characterized by their SiO_{2}:Na_{2}O weight ratio (which can be converted to molar ratio by multiplication with 1.032). The ratio can vary between 1:2 and 3.75:1. Grades with ratio below 2.85:1 are termed alkaline. Those with a higher SiO_{2}:Na_{2}O ratio are described as neutral.

== Properties ==
Sodium silicates are colorless glassy or crystalline solids, or white powders. Except for the most silicon-rich ones, they are readily soluble in water, producing alkaline solutions. When dried up it still can be rehydrated in water.

Sodium silicates are stable in neutral and alkaline solutions. In acidic solutions, the silicate ions react with hydrogen ions to form silicic acids, which tend to decompose into hydrated silicon dioxide gel. Heated to drive off the water, the result is a hard translucent substance called silica gel, widely used as a desiccant. It can withstand temperatures up to 1100 °C.

== Production ==
Solutions of sodium silicates can be produced by treating a mixture of silica (usually as quartz sand), caustic soda, and water, with hot steam in a reactor. The overall reaction is

2x NaOH + SiO_{2} → (Na_{2}O)_{x}·SiO_{2} + x H_{2}O

Sodium silicates can also be obtained by dissolving silica SiO_{2} (whose melting point is 1713 °C) in molten sodium carbonate (that melts with decomposition at 851 °C):

x Na_{2}CO_{3} + SiO_{2} → (Na_{2}O)_{x}·SiO_{2} + x CO_{2}

The material can be obtained also from sodium sulfate (melting point 884 °C) with carbon as a reducing agent:

2x Na_{2}SO_{4} + C + 2 SiO_{2} → 2 (Na_{2}O)_{x}·SiO_{2} + 2 SO_{2} + CO_{2}

In 1990, 4 million tons of alkali metal silicates were produced.

=== Ferrosilicon ===
Sodium silicate may be produced as a part of hydrogen production by dissolving ferrosilicon in an aqueous sodium hydroxide (NaOH·H_{2}O) solution:

2NaOH + Si + H_{2}O → Na_{2}SiO_{3} + 2H_{2}

=== Bayer process ===
Though unprofitable, Na_{2}SiO_{3} is a byproduct of Bayer process which is often converted to calcium silicate (Ca_{2}SiO_{4}).

== Uses ==
The main applications of sodium silicates are in detergents, paper industry (as a deinking agent), water treatment, and construction materials.

=== Adhesives ===
The adhesive properties of sodium silicate were noted as early as the 1850s and have been widely used at least since the First World War. The largest application of sodium silicate solutions is a cement for producing cardboard. When used as a paper cement, the sodium silicate joint tends to crack within a few years, at which point it no longer holds the paper surfaces cemented together.

Sodium silicate solutions can also be used as a spin-on adhesive layer to bond glass to glass or a silicon dioxide–covered silicon wafer to one another. Sodium silicate glass-to-glass bonding has the advantage that it is a low-temperature bonding technique, as opposed to fusion bonding. It also requires less processing than glass-to-glass anodic bonding, which requires an intermediate layer such as silicon nitride (SiN) to act as a diffusion barrier for sodium ions. The deposition of such a layer requires a low-pressure chemical vapor deposition step. A disadvantage of sodium silicate bonding, however, is that it is very difficult to eliminate air bubbles. This is in part because the technique does not require a vacuum and also does not use field assistance as in anodic bonding. This lack of field assistance can sometimes be beneficial, because field assistance can provide such high attraction between wafers as to bend a thinner wafer and collapse onto nanofluidic cavity or MEMS elements.

=== Coatings ===
Sodium silicate may be used for various paints and coatings, such as those used on welding rods. Such coatings can be cured in two ways. One method is to heat a thin layer of sodium silicate into a gel and then into a hard film. To make the coating water-resistant, high temperatures of 100 °C (212 °F; 373 K) are needed. The temperature is slowly raised to 150 °C (302 °F; 423 K) to dehydrate the film and avoid steaming and blistering. The process must be relatively slow, but infrared lamps may be used at first. In the other method, when high temperatures are not practical, the water resistance may be achieved by chemicals (or esters), such as boric acid, phosphoric acid, sodium fluorosilicate, and aluminium phosphate. Before application, an aqueous solution of sodium silicate is mixed with a curing agent.

It is used in detergent auxiliaries such as complex sodium disilicate and modified sodium disilicate. The detergent granules gain their ruggedness from a coating of silicates.

=== Water treatment ===
Sodium silicate is used as an alum coagulant and an iron flocculant in wastewater treatment plants. Sodium silicate binds to colloidal molecules, creating larger aggregates that sink to the bottom of the water column. The microscopic negatively charged particles suspended in water interact with sodium silicate. Their electrical double layer collapses due to the increase of ionic strength caused by the addition of sodium silicate (doubly negatively charged anion accompanied by two sodium cations) and they subsequently aggregate. This process is called coagulation.

=== Foundries, refractories and pottery ===
It is used as a binder of the sand when doing sand casting of all common metals. It allows for the rapid production of a strong mold or core by three main methods.

- Method 1 requires passing carbon dioxide gas through the mixture of sand and sodium silicate in the sand molding box or core box. The carbon dioxide reacts with the sodium silicate to form solid silica gel and sodium carbonate. This provides adequate strength to remove the now hardened sand shape from the forming tool. Additional strength occurs as any unreacted sodium silicate in the sand shape dehydrates.
- Method 2 requires adding an ester (reaction product of an acid and an alcohol) to the mixture of sand and sodium silicate before it is placed into the molding box or core box. As the ester hydrolyzes from the water in the liquid sodium silicate, an acid is released which causes the liquid sodium silicate to gel. Once the gel has formed, it will dehydrate to a glassy phase as a result of syneresis. Commonly used esters include acetate esters of glycerol and ethylene glycol as well as carbonate esters of propylene and ethylene glycol. The higher the water solubility of the ester, the faster the hardening of the sand.
- Method 3 requires microwave energy to heat and dehydrate the mixture of sand and sodium silicate in the sand molding box or core box. The forming tools must pass through microwaves for this to work well. Because sodium silicate has a high dielectric constant, it absorbs microwave energy very rapidly. Fully dehydrated sand shapes can be produced within a minute of microwave exposure. This method produces the highest strength of sand shapes bonded with sodium silicate.

Since the sodium silicate does not burn during casting (it can actually melt at pouring temperatures above 1800 °F, 982 °C), it is common to add organic materials to provide for enhanced sand breakdown after casting. The additives include sugar, starch, carbons, wood flour and phenolic resins.

Water glass is a useful binder for solids, such as vermiculite and perlite. When blended with the latter lightweight fraction, water glass can be used to make hard, high-temperature insulation boards used for refractories, passive fire protection, and high-temperature insulations, such as in moulded pipe insulation applications. When mixed with finely divided mineral powders, such as vermiculite dust (which is common scrap from the exfoliation process), one can produce high temperature adhesives. The intumescence (thermal expansion) disappears in the presence of finely divided mineral dust, whereby the waterglass becomes a mere matrix. Waterglass is inexpensive and abundantly available, which makes its use popular in many refractory applications.

Sodium silicate is used as a deflocculant in casting slips helping reduce viscosity and the need for large amounts of water to liquidize the clay body. It is also used to create a crackle effect in pottery, usually wheel-thrown. A vase or bottle is thrown on the wheel, fairly narrow and with thick walls. Sodium silicate is brushed on a section of the piece. After five minutes, the wall of the piece is stretched outward with a rib or hand. The result is a wrinkled or cracked look.

It is also the main agent in "magic water", which is used when joining clay pieces, especially if the moisture level of the two differs.

=== Dyes ===
Sodium silicate solution is used as a fixative for hand dyeing with reactive dyes that require a high pH to react with the textile fiber. After the dye is applied to a cellulose-based fabric, such as cotton or rayon, or onto silk, it is allowed to dry, after which the sodium silicate is painted on to the dyed fabric, covered with plastic to retain moisture, and left to react for an hour at room temperature.

=== Repair work ===
Sodium silicate is used, along with magnesium silicate, in muffler repair and fitting paste. Magnesium silicate can be mixed with a solution of sodium silicate to form a thick paste that is easy to apply. When the exhaust system of an internal combustion engine heats up to its operating temperature, the heat drives out all of the excess water from the paste. The silicate compounds that are left over have glass-like properties, making a temporary, brittle repair that can be reinforced with glass fibre.

Sodium silicate can be used to fill gaps in the head gasket of an engine. This is especially useful for aluminium alloy cylinder heads, which are sensitive to thermally induced surface deflection. Sodium silicate is added to the cooling system through the radiator and allowed to circulate. When the sodium silicate reaches its "conversion" temperature of 100–105 °C (212–221 °F), it loses water molecules and forms a glass seal with a re-melting temperature above 810 °C (1,490 °F). This repair can last two years or longer, and symptoms disappear instantly. However, this repair works only when the sodium silicate reaches its "conversion" temperature. Also, sodium silicate (glass particulate) contamination of lubricants is detrimental to their function, and contamination of engine oil is a serious possibility in situations in which a coolant-to-oil leak is present.

Sodium silicate solution is used to inexpensively, quickly, and permanently disable automobile engines. Running an engine with half a U.S. gallon (or about two liters) of a sodium silicate solution instead of motor oil causes the solution to precipitate, catastrophically damaging the engine's bearings and pistons within a few minutes. In the United States, this procedure was used to comply with requirements of the Car Allowance Rebate System (CARS) program.

=== Construction ===
A mixture of sodium silicate and sawdust has been used in between the double skin of certain safes. This not only makes them more fire resistant, but also makes cutting them open with an oxyacetylene torch extremely difficult due to the smoke emitted.

Sodium silicate is frequently used in drilling fluids to stabilize and avoid the collapse of borehole walls. It is particularly useful when drill holes pass through argillaceous formations containing swelling clay minerals such as smectite or montmorillonite.

Concrete treated with a sodium silicate solution helps to reduce porosity in most masonry products such as concrete, stucco, and plasters. This effect aids in reducing water penetration, but has no known effect on reducing water vapor transmission and emission. A chemical reaction occurs with the excess Ca(OH)_{2} (portlandite) present in the concrete that permanently binds the silicates with the surface, making them far more durable and water repellent. This treatment generally is applied only after the initial cure has taken place (approximately seven days depending on conditions). These coatings are known as silicate mineral paint. An example of the reaction of sodium silicate with the calcium hydroxide found in concrete to form calcium silicate hydrate (CSH) gel, the main product in hydrated Portland cement, follows.

Na_{2}SiO_{3} + y H_{2}O + x Ca(OH)_{2} → x CaO.SiO_{2}.y H_{2}O + 2NaOH

=== Crystal gardens ===
When crystals of a number of metallic salts are dropped into a solution of water glass, simple or branching stalagmites of colored metal silicates are formed. This phenomenon has been used by manufacturers of toys and chemistry sets to provide instructive enjoyment to many generations of children from the early 20th century until the present. An early mention of crystals of metallic salts forming a "chemical garden" in sodium silicate is found in the 1946 Modern Mechanix magazine. Metal salts used included the sulfates and/or chlorides of copper, cobalt, iron, nickel, and manganese.

=== Sealants ===
Sodium silicate with additives was injected into the ground to harden it and thereby to prevent further leakage of highly radioactive water from the Fukushima Daiichi nuclear power plant in Japan in April, 2011. The residual heat carried by the water used for cooling the damaged reactors accelerated the setting of the injected mixture.

On June 3, 1958, the USS Nautilus, the world's first nuclear submarine, visited Everett and Seattle. In Seattle, crewmen dressed in civilian clothing were sent in to secretly buy 140 quarts (160 liters) of an automotive product containing sodium silicate (originally identified as Stop Leak) to repair a leaking condenser system. The Nautilus was en route to the North Pole on a top secret mission to cross the North Pole submerged.

=== Firearms ===
A historical use of the adhesive properties of sodium silicates is the production of paper cartridges for black powder revolvers produced by Colt's Manufacturing Company between 1851 and 1873, especially during the American Civil War. Sodium silicate was used to seal combustible nitrated paper together to form a conical paper cartridge to hold the black powder, as well as to cement the lead ball or conical bullet into the open end of the paper cartridge. Such sodium silicate cemented paper cartridges were inserted into the cylinders of revolvers, thereby speeding the reloading of cap-and-ball black powder revolvers. This use largely ended with the introduction of Colt revolvers employing brass-cased cartridges starting in 1873. Similarly, sodium silicate was also used to cement the top wad into brass shotgun shells, thereby eliminating any need for a crimp at the top of the brass shotgun shell to hold a shotgun shell together. Reloading brass shotgun shells was widely practiced by self-reliant American farmers during the 1870s, using the same waterglass material that was also used to preserve eggs. The cementing of the top wad on a shotgun shell consisted of applying from three to five drops of waterglass on the top wad to secure it to the brass hull. Brass hulls for shotgun shells were superseded by paper hulls starting around 1877. The newer paper-hulled shotgun shells used a roll crimp in place of a waterglass-cemented joint to hold the top wad in the shell. However, whereas brass shotshells with top wads cemented with waterglass could be reloaded nearly indefinitely (given powder, wad, and shot, of course), the paper hulls that replaced the brass hulls could be reloaded only a few times.

=== Food and medicine ===
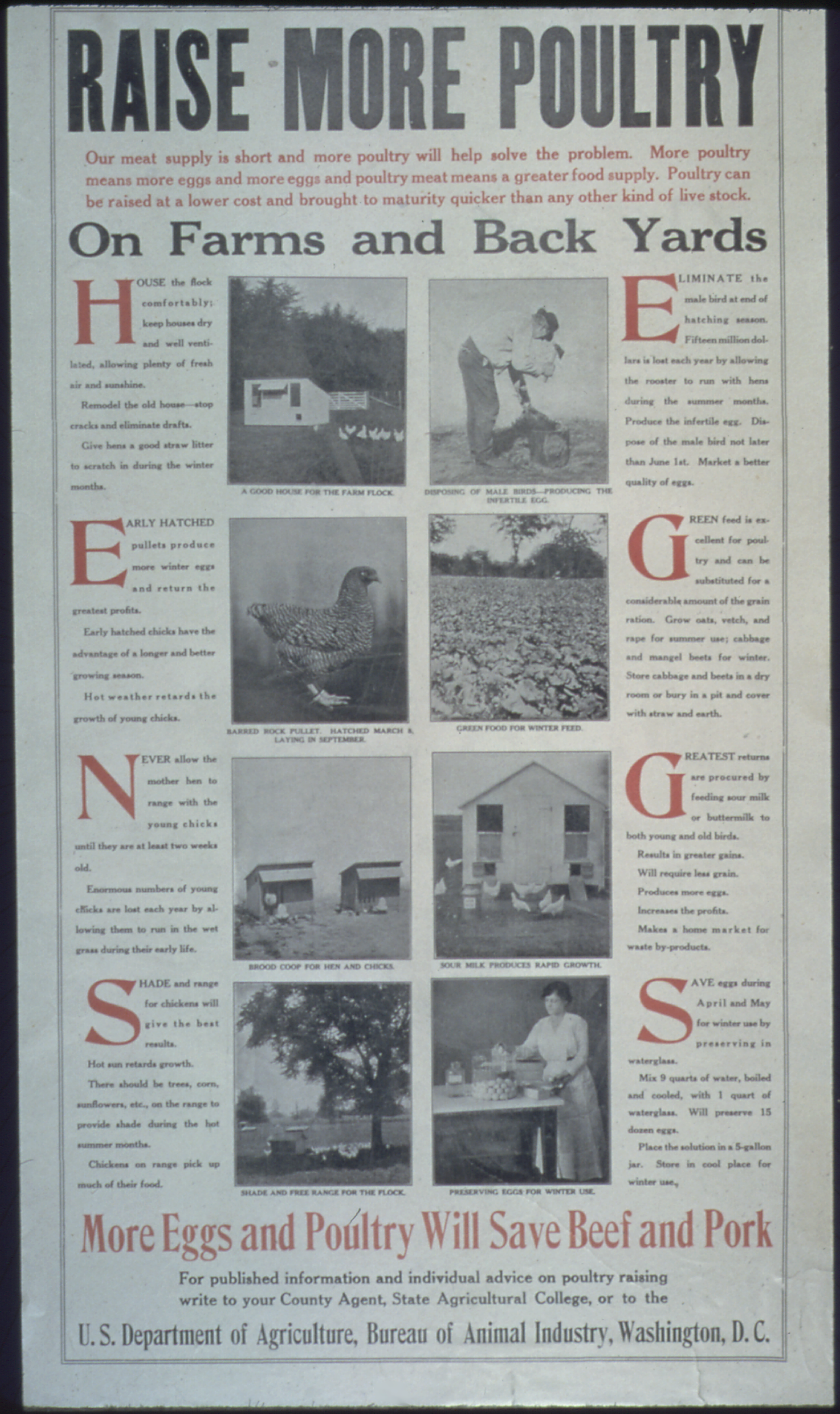
World War I poster suggesting the use of waterglass to preserve eggs

Sodium silicate and other silicates are the primary components in "instant" wrinkle remover creams, which temporarily tighten the skin to minimize the appearance of wrinkles and under-eye bags. These creams, when applied as a thin film and allowed to dry for a few minutes, can present dramatic results. This effect is not permanent, lasting from a few minutes up to a couple of hours. It works like water cement, once the muscle starts to move, it cracks and leaves white residues on the skin.

Waterglass has been used as an egg preservative with large success, primarily when refrigeration is not available. Fresh-laid eggs are immersed in a solution of sodium silicate (waterglass). After being immersed in the solution, they are removed and allowed to dry. A permanent air tight coating remains on the eggs. If they are then stored in appropriate environment, the majority of bacteria which would otherwise cause them to spoil are kept out and their moisture is kept in. According to the cited source, treated eggs can be kept fresh using this method for up to five months. When boiling eggs preserved that way, the shell is no longer permeable to air, and the egg will tend to crack unless a hole in the shell is made (e.g., with a pin) in order to allow steam to escape.

Sodium silicate's flocculant properties are also used to clarify wine and beer by precipitating colloidal particles. As a clearing agent, though, sodium silicate is sometimes confused with isinglass which is prepared from collagen extracted from the dried swim bladders of sturgeon and other fishes.

Sodium silicate gel is also used as a substrate for algal growth in aquaculture hatcheries.

== History ==
Soluble silicates of alkali metals (sodium or potassium) were observed by European alchemists in the 16th century. Giambattista della Porta observed in 1567 that tartari salis (cream of tartar, potassium bitartrate) caused powdered crystallum (quartz) to melt at a lower temperature. Other possible early references to alkali silicates were made by Basil Valentine in 1520, and by Agricola in 1550. Around 1640, Jan Baptist van Helmont reported the formation of alkali silicates as a soluble substance made by melting sand with excess alkali, and observed that the silica could be precipitated quantitatively by adding acid to the solution.

In 1646, Glauber made potassium silicate, which he called liquor silicum, by melting potassium carbonate (obtained by calcinating cream of tartar) and sand in a crucible, and keeping it molten until it ceased to bubble (due to the release of carbon dioxide). The mixture was allowed to cool and then was ground to a fine powder. When the powder was exposed to moist air, it gradually formed a viscous liquid, which Glauber called "Oleum oder Liquor Silicum, Arenæ, vel Crystallorum" (i.e., oil or solution of silica, sand or quartz crystal).

However, it was later claimed that the substances prepared by those alchemists were not waterglass as it is understood today. That would have been prepared in 1818 by Johann Nepomuk von Fuchs, by treating silicic acid with an alkali; the result being soluble in water, "but not affected by atmospheric changes".

The terms "water glass" and "soluble glass" were used by Leopold Wolff in 1846, by Émile Kopp in 1857, and by Hermann Krätzer in 1887.

In 1892, Rudolf Von Wagner distinguished soda, potash, double (soda and potash), and fixing (i.e., stabilizing) as types of water glass. The fixing type was "a mixture of silica well saturated with potash water glass and a sodium silicate" used to stabilize inorganic water color pigments on cement work for outdoor signs and murals.

== See also ==
- Precipitated silica
- Sodium carbonate
- Sodium stannate
- Sodium germanate
