= Concrete degradation =

Damage to concrete affecting its mechanical strength and its durability

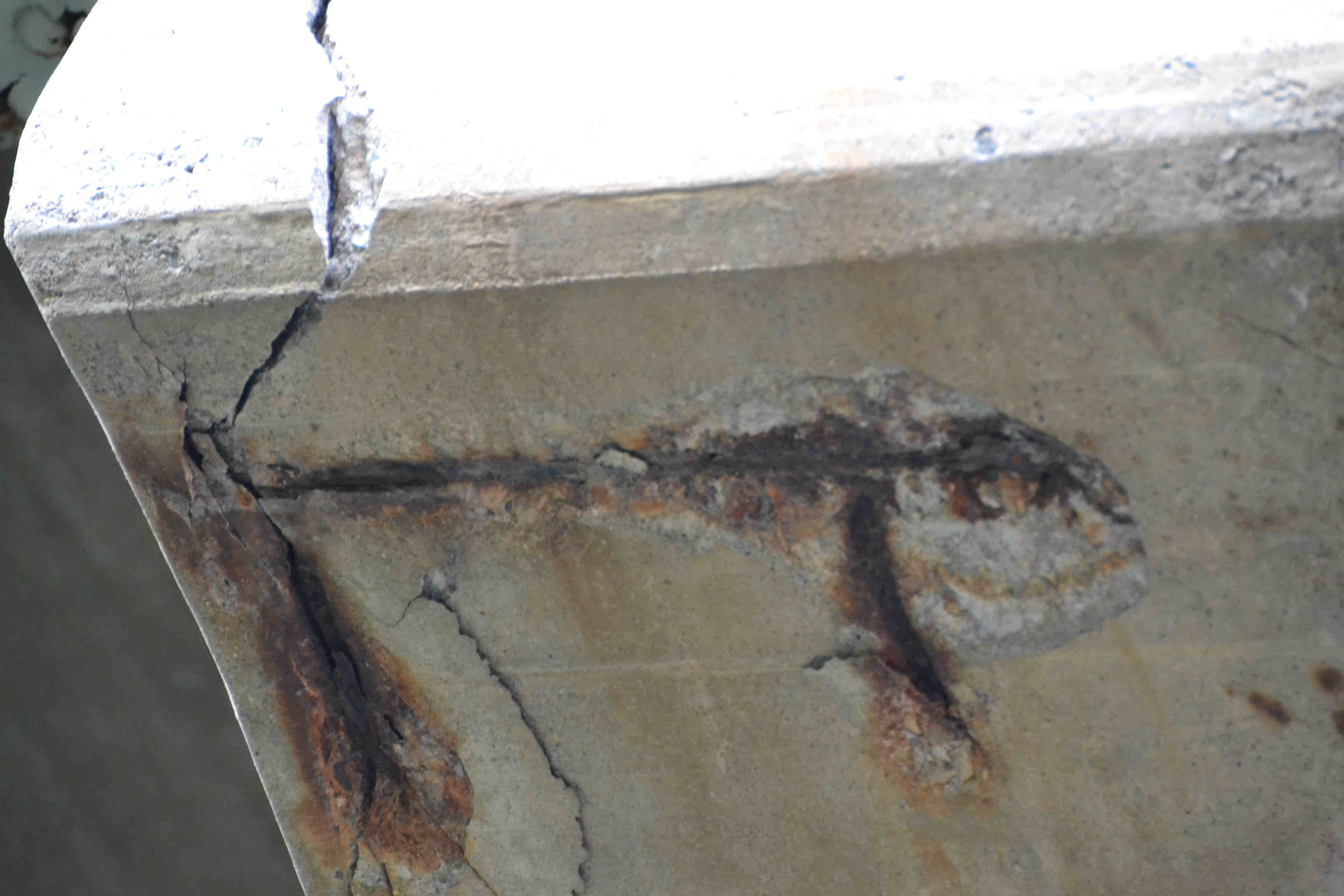
Degraded concrete and rusted, exposed reinforcement bar (rebar) on Welland River bridge of the Queen Elizabeth Way in Niagara Falls, Ontario.

Concrete degradation has many different causes. Concrete is mostly damaged by the corrosion of reinforcement bars, the carbonatation of hardened cement paste or chloride attack under wet conditions. Chemical damage is caused by the formation of expansive products produced by chemical reactions (from carbonatation, chlorides, sulfates and distillate water), by aggressive chemical species present in groundwater and seawater (chlorides, sulfates, magnesium ions), or by microorganisms (bacteria, fungi...) Other damaging processes can also involve calcium leaching by water infiltration, physical phenomena initiating cracks formation and propagation, fire or radiant heat, aggregate expansion, sea water effects, leaching, and erosion by fast-flowing water.

The most destructive agent of concrete structures and components is probably water. Indeed, water often directly participates in chemical reactions as a reagent and is always necessary as a solvent, or a reacting medium, making transport of solutes and reactions possible. Without water, many harmful reactions cannot progress, or are so slow that their harmful consequences become negligible during the planned service life of the construction. Dry concrete has a much longer lifetime than water saturated concrete in contact with circulating water. So, when possible, concrete must first be protected from water infiltration.

== Corrosion of reinforcement bars ==
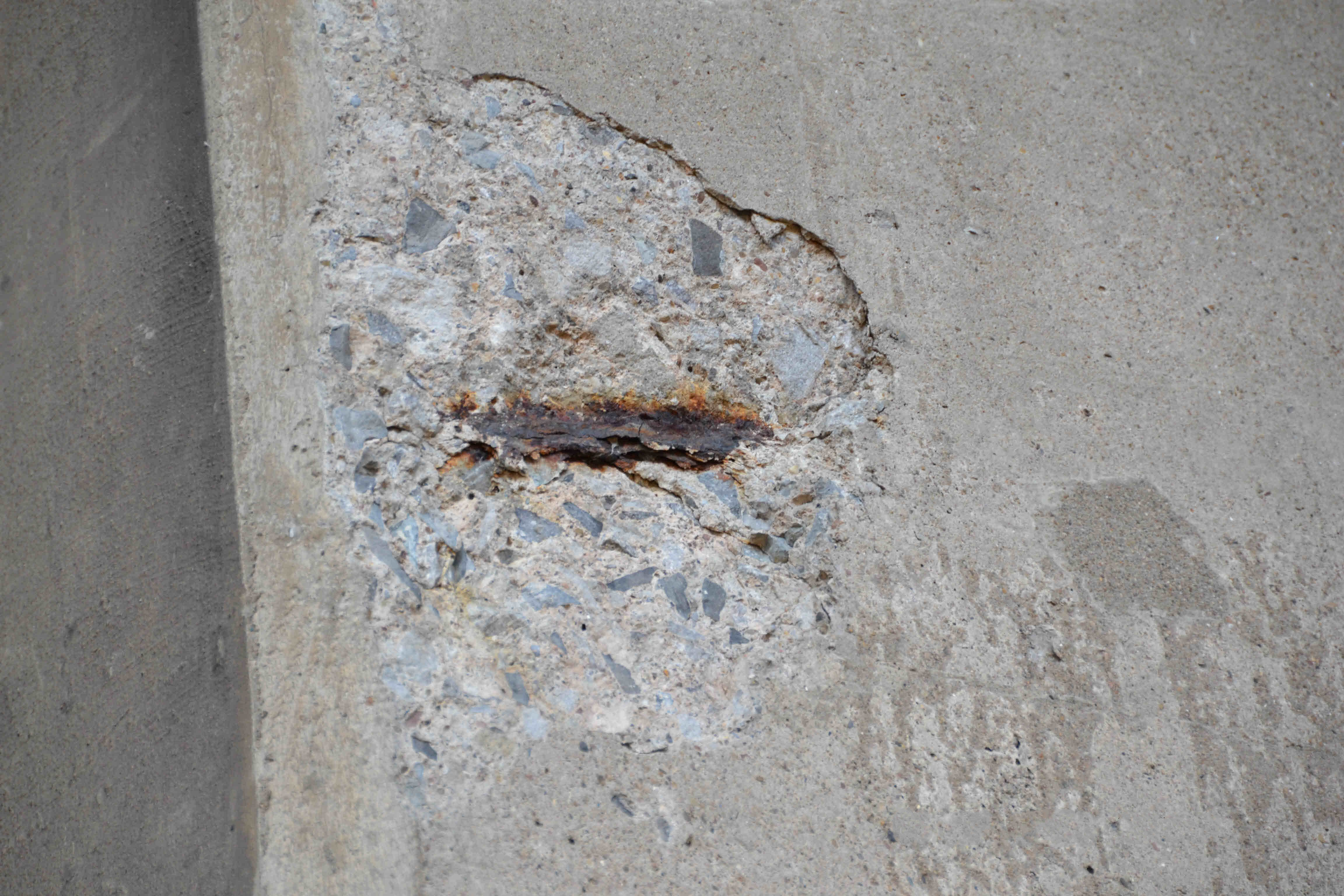
Example of flat piece of concrete having dislodged with corroded rebar underneath, Welland River bridge across Queen Elizabeth Way in Niagara Falls, Ontario.

The expansion of the corrosion products (iron oxides) of carbon steel reinforcement structures may induce internal mechanical stress (tensile stress) that cause the formation of cracks and disrupt the concrete structure. If rebars have been improperly installed or have inadequate concrete cover at surfaces exposed to the elements, oxide jacking and spalling can occur during the structure's lifetime: flat fragments of concrete are detached from the concrete mass as a result of the rebar's corrosion.

Concrete, like most consolidated hard rocks, is a material very resistant to compression but which cannot withstand tension, especially internal tensions. Its tensile strength is about 10 times lower than its compressive strength. In itself carbonated concrete is a very solid material because its compressive strength increases due to its porosity decrease by the precipitation of calcium carbonate (calcite, CaCO_{3}). In the absence of steel reinforcement bars and without the formation of expansive reaction products inducing tensile stress inside the concrete matrix, pure concrete is most often a long-lasting material. An illustration of the concrete intrinsic durability is the dome of the Pantheon building in Rome made with Roman concrete more than 2000 years ago.

When atmospheric carbon dioxide (CO_{2}), or carbonate ions (HCO^{−}_{3}, CO^{2−}_{3} dissolved in water) diffuse into concrete from its external surface, they react with calcium hydroxide (portlandite, Ca(OH)_{2}) and the pH of the concrete pore water progressively decreases from 13.5 – 12.5 to 8.5 (pH of water in equilibrium with calcite). Below a pH value of about 9.5 – 10, the solubility of iron oxides present at the surface of carbon steel increases and they start to dissolve. As a consequence, they no longer protect the underlying metallic iron against oxidation by atmospheric oxygen and the reinforcement bars are no longer passivated against corrosion. It is the considerable forces internally created by the expansion of the iron corrosion products (about 6 – 7 times less dense than metallic iron, so 6 – 7 times more voluminous) that cause the cracks in the concrete matrix and destroy reinforced concrete. In the absence of iron (and without some harmful chemical degradation reactions also producing expansive products) concrete would probably be one of the most durable materials. However, steel reinforcement bars are necessary to take over the tensile efforts to which concrete is submitted in most engineering structures and stainless steel would be too costly a metal to replace carbon steel. Zinc-galvanization or epoxy-coating can improve the corrosion resistance of rebar, but have also other disadvantages such as their lower surface adhesion to concrete (risk of slip), the possible formation of cathodic and anodic zones conducive to galvanic corrosion if the protective coating is locally punctured or damaged, and their higher costs.

== Formation of expansive phases in concrete ==
As hard rocks, concrete can withstand high compressive stress but not tensile stress. As a consequence, concrete is easily damaged when expansion phases are formed in its mass.

The most ubiquitous, and best known, expansive phases are probably the iron oxides produced by the oxidation of the carbon steel reinforcement bars embedded into concrete. Corrosion products are formed around rebar located in carbonated concrete (and thus no longer passivated against corrosion), or directly exposed to the atmospheric oxygen once cracks have started to form. The damages produced by rebar corrosion are clearly visible with bare eyes and their diagnostic is easy.

Other deleterious expansive chemical reactions more difficult to characterize and to identify can occur in concrete. They may be first distinguished according to the location where they occur in concrete: inside the aggregates or in the hardened cement paste.

=== Expansion inside the aggregates ===
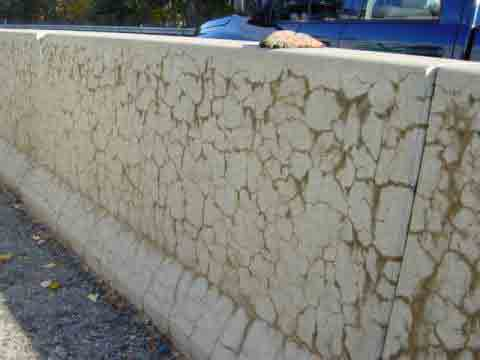
Typical crack pattern associated with the alkali-silica reaction affecting a concrete step barrier on a US highway (photograph, courtesy of the Federal Highway Administration, US Department of Transportation).

Various types of aggregates can undergo different chemical reactions and swell inside concrete, leading to damaging expansive phenomena.

Alkali–silica reaction

The most common are those containing reactive amorphous silica, that can react in the presence of water with the cement alkalis (K_{2}O and Na_{2}O). Among the more reactive siliceous mineral components of some aggregates are opal, chalcedony, flint and strained quartz. Silica (in fact silicic acid when hydrated) is easily dissolved by sodium hydroxide (NaOH) to form sodium silicate (Na_{2}SiO_{3}), a strong desiccant with a high affinity for water. This reaction is at the core of the alkali–silica reaction (ASR):

2 NaOH + SiO_{2} → Na_{2}SiO_{3} · H_{2}O

Following this reaction, a hygroscopic and expansive viscous silicagel phase forms inside the affected aggregates which swell and crack from inside. In its turn, the volumetric expansion of the swollen aggregates damages the concrete matrix and extensive cracks propagate causing structural damages in the concrete structure. On the surface of concrete pavements, the ASR can also cause pop-outs, i.e. the expulsion of small cones (up to 3 cm (1 in) in diameter), corresponding to aggregate particle size.

A quite similar reaction (alkali-silicate reaction) can occur when clay minerals are present in some impure aggregates, and it may also lead to destructive expansion.

Alkali–carbonate reaction

With some aggregates containing dolomite, a dedolomitization reaction, also known as alkali-carbonate reaction (ACR), can occur where the magnesium carbonate (MgCO_{3}) reacts with the hydroxyl ions (OH^{−}) and yields magnesium hydroxide (brucite, Mg(OH)_{2}) and a carbonate ion (CO^{2−}_{3}). The resulting expansion caused by the swelling of brucite can cause destruction of the material:

CaMg(CO_{3})_{2} + 2 NaOH → Mg(OH)_{2} + CaCO_{3} + Na_{2}CO_{3}

Often the alkali–silicate reaction and the dedolomitization reaction are masked by a much more severe alkali–silica reaction dominating the deleterious effects. Because the alkali-carbonate reaction (ACR) is often thwarted by a coexisting ASR reaction, it explains why ACR is no longer considered to be a major detrimental reaction.

Pyrite oxidation

Far less common are degradation and pop-outs caused by the presence of pyrite (FeS_{2}), a Fe^{2+} disulfide (^{–}S-S^{–}) very sensitive to oxidation by atmospheric oxygen, that generates expansion by forming less dense insoluble iron oxides (Fe_{2}O_{3}), iron oxy-hydroxides (FeO(OH), or Fe_{2}O_{3}·nH_{2}O) and mildly soluble gypsum (CaSO_{4}·2H_{2}O).

When complete (i.e., when all Fe^{2+} ions are also oxidized into less soluble Fe^{3+} ions), pyrite oxidation can be globally written as follows:

2 FeS_{2} + 7.5 O_{2} + 4 H_{2}O → Fe_{2}O_{3} + 4 H_{2}SO_{4}

The sulfuric acid released by pyrite oxidation then reacts with portlandite (Ca(OH_{2})) present in the hardened cement paste to give gypsum:

H_{2}SO_{4} + Ca(OH)_{2} → CaSO_{4} · 2H_{2}O

When concrete is carbonated by atmospheric carbon dioxide (CO_{2}), or if limestone aggregates are used in concrete, H_{2}SO_{4} reacts with calcite (CaCO_{3}) and water to also form gypsum while releasing CO_{2} back to the atmosphere:

H_{2}SO_{4} + CaCO_{3} + H_{2}O → CaSO_{4} · 2H_{2}O + CO_{2}

The dihydrated gypsum is relatively soluble in water (~ 1 – 2 g/L) at room temperature and thus mobile. It can easily be leached by infiltration water and can form efflorescences on the concrete surface while the insoluble Fe_{2}O_{3}·nH_{2}O remain in place around the grains of oxidized pyrite they taint in red-ocre.

=== Expansive chemical reactions inside the hardened cement paste ===
The sulfate anions reacting with different phases of the hardened cement paste (HCP) to form more voluminous reaction products can cause 3 types of expansive reactions called sulfate attack inside HCP:

1. The delayed ettringite formation (DEF) also known as internal sulfate attack (ISA);
2. The external sulfate attack (ESA), and;
3. The thaumasite form of sulfate attack (TSA).

These three types of sulfate attack reactions are described into more details in specific sections latter in the text. When the hardened cement paste (HCP) is affected, the detrimental consequences for the structural stability of concrete structures are generally more severe than when aggregates are affected: DEF, ESA and TSA are much more damaging for concrete than ASR and ACR reactions.

A common points to all these various chemical expansive reaction is that they all require water as a reactant and as a reaction medium. The presence of water is always an aggravating factor. Concrete structures immersed in water as dams and bridge piles are therefore particularly sensitive. These reactions are also characterized by slow reaction kinetics, depending on environmental conditions such as temperature and relative humidity. They develop at a slow rate and may take several years before damages become apparent. Often a decade is needed to observe their harmful consequences. Protecting concrete structures from water contact may help to slow down the progression of the damages.

== Chemical damages ==
=== Carbonation ===
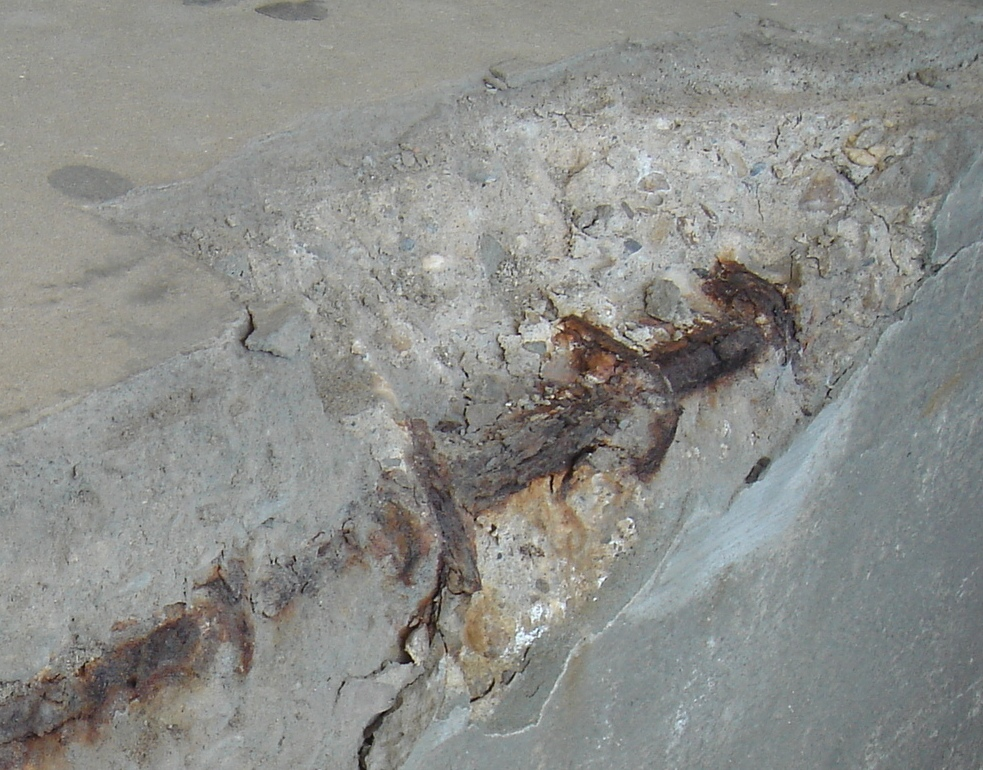
Carbonation-initiated deterioration of concrete at Hippodrome Wellington, Belgium.

Carbon dioxide (CO_{2}) from air (~ 412 ppm vol.) and bicarbonate (HCO^{−}_{3}) or carbonate (CO^{2−}_{3}) anions dissolved in water react with the calcium hydroxide (Ca(OH)_{2}, portlandite) produced by Portland cement hydration in concrete to form calcium carbonate (CaCO_{3}) while releasing a water molecule in the following reaction:

CO_{2} + Ca(OH)_{2} → CaCO_{3} + H_{2}O

Exception made of the water molecule, the carbonation reaction is essentially the reverse of the process of calcination of limestone taking place in a cement kiln:

CaCO_{3} → CaO + CO_{2}

Carbonation of concrete is a slow and continuous process of atmospheric CO_{2} diffusing from the outer surface of concrete exposed to air into its mass and chemically reacting with the mineral phases of the hydrated cement paste. Carbonation slows down with increasing diffusion depth.

Carbonation has two antagonist effects for (1) the concrete strength, and (2) its durability:

1. The precipitation of calcite filling the microscopic voids in the concrete pore space decreases the concrete matrix porosity: so, it increases the mechanical strength of concrete;
2. At the same time carbonation consumes portlandite and therefore decreases the concrete alkalinity reserve buffer. Hyper-alkaline conditions (i.e., basic chemical conditions) characterized by a high pH (typically 12.5 – 13.5) are needed to passivate the steel surface of the reinforcement bars (rebar) and to protect them from corrosion. Below a pH of 10, the solubility of the iron oxides forming a protective thin coating at the surface of carbon steel increases. The thin protective oxide layer starts to dissolve, and corrosion is then promoted. As the volumetric mass of iron oxides can be as high as 6 – 7 times that of metallic iron (Fe), a detrimental consequence is the expansion of the corrosion products around the rebar. This causes the development of a tensile stress in the concrete matrix around the rebar. When the tensile strength of concrete is exceeded in the concrete cover above the rebar, concrete starts to spall. Cracks appear in the concrete cover protecting the rebar against corrosion and constitute preferential pathways for CO_{2} direct ingress towards the rebar. This accelerates the carbonation reaction and in turn the corrosion process speeds up.

This explains why the carbonation reaction of reinforced concrete is an undesirable process in concrete chemistry. Concrete carbonation can be visually revealed by applying a phenolphthalein solution over the fresh surface of a concrete samples (concrete core, prism, freshly fractured bar). Phenolphthalein is a pH indicator, whose color turns from colorless at pH < 8.5 to pink-fuchsia at pH > 9.5. A violet color indicates still alkaline areas and thus non-carbonated concrete. Carbonated zones favorable for steel corrosion and concrete degradation are colorless.

The presence of water in carbonated concrete is necessary to lower the pH of concrete pore water around rebar and to depassivate the carbon steel surface at low pH. Water is central to corrosion processes. Without water, the steel corrosion is very limited and rebar present in dry carbonated concrete structures, or components, not affected by water infiltration do not suffer from significant corrosion.

=== Chloride attack ===
The main effect of chloride ions on reinforced concrete is to cause pitting corrosion of the steel reinforcement bars (rebar). It is a surreptitious and dangerous form of localized corrosion because the rebar sections can be decreased to the point that the steel reinforcement are no longer capable of withstanding the tensile efforts they are supposed to resist by design. When the rebar sections are too small or the rebar are locally broken, the reinforcement is lost, and concrete is no longer reinforced.

Chlorides, particularly calcium chloride, have been used to shorten the setting time of concrete. However, calcium chloride and (to a lesser extent) sodium chloride have been shown to leach calcium hydroxide and cause chemical changes in Portland cement, leading to loss of strength, as well as attacking the steel reinforcement present in most concrete. The ten-storey Queen Elizabeth hospital in Kota Kinabalu contained a high percentage of chloride causing early failure.

=== Alkali–silica reaction (ASR) ===
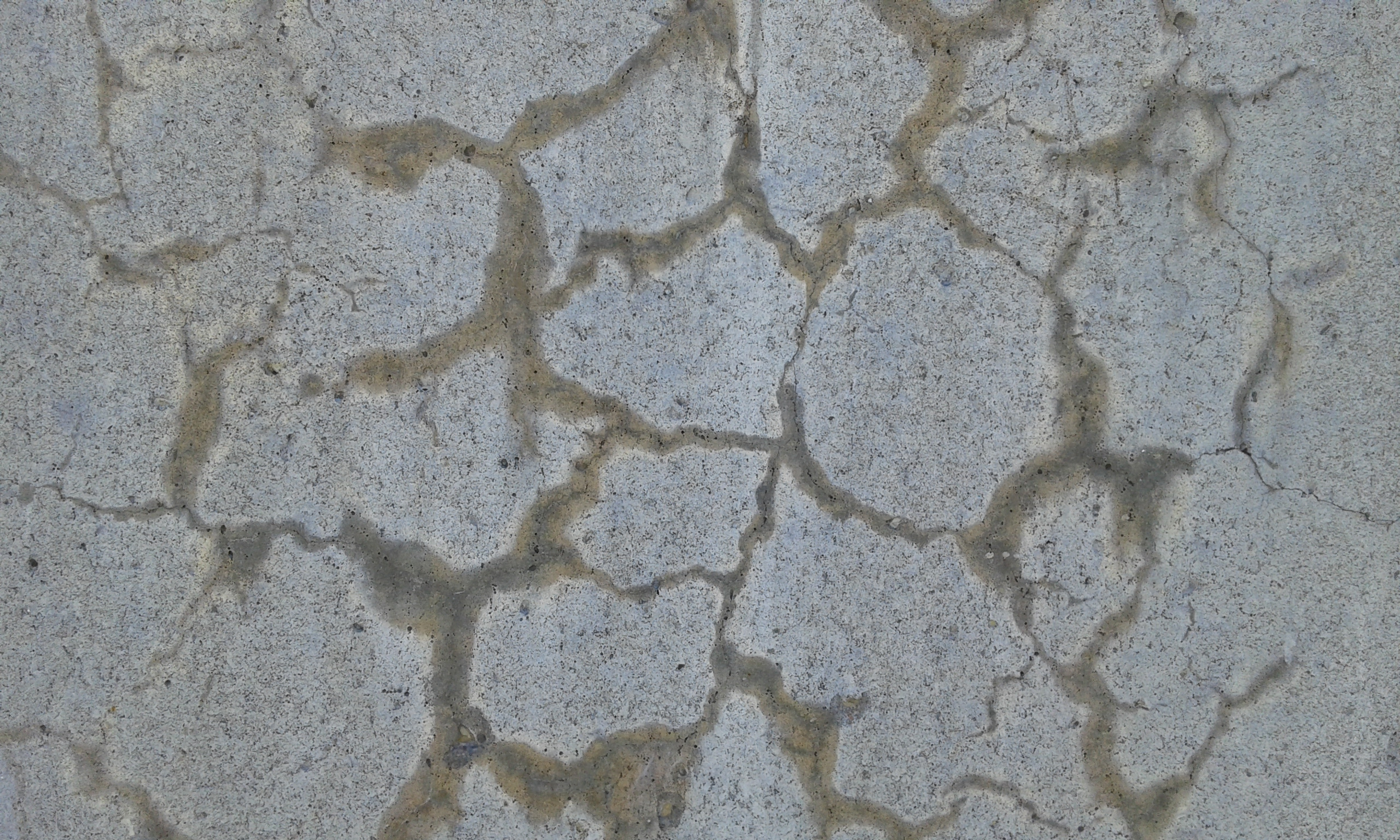
Typical crack pattern of the alkali–silica reaction (ASR). The gel exudations through the concrete cracks have a characteristic yellow color and a high pH. The fatty aspect of the exudations imbibing the concrete porosity along the cracks is also a distinctive feature of ASR.

The alkali–silica reaction (ASR) is a deleterious chemical reaction between the alkali (Na_{2}O and K_{2}O), dissolved in concrete pore water as NaOH and KOH, with reactive amorphous (non-crystalline) siliceous aggregates in the presence of moisture. The simplest way to write the reaction in a stylized manner is the following (other representations also exist):

2 NaOH + SiO_{2} → Na_{2}SiO_{3} · H_{2}O (young N-S-H gel)

This reaction produces a gel-like substance of sodium silicate (Na_{2}SiO_{3} • n H_{2}O), also noted Na_{2}H_{2}SiO_{4} • n H_{2}O, or N-S-H (sodium silicate hydrate). This hygroscopic gel swells inside the affected reactive aggregates which expand and crack. In its turn, it causes concrete expansion. If concrete is heavily reinforced, it can first cause some prestressing effect before cracking and damaging the structure. ASR affects the aggregates and is recognizable by cracked aggregates. It does not directly affect the hardened cement paste (HCP).

=== Delayed ettringite formation (DEF, or ISA) ===
When the temperature of concrete exceeds 65 °C for too long a time at an early age, the crystallization of ettringite (AFt) does not occur because of its higher solubility at elevated temperature and the then less soluble mono-sulfate (AFm) is formed. After dissipation of the cement hydration heat, temperature goes back to ambient and the temperature curves of the solubilities of AFt and AFm phases cross over. The mono-sulfate (AFm) now more soluble at low temperature slowly dissolves to recrystallize as the less soluble ettringite (AFt). AFt crystal structure hosts more water molecules than AFm. So, AFt has a higher molar volume than AFm because of its 32 H_{2}O molecules. During months, or years, after young concrete cooling, AFt crystallizes very slowly as small acicular needles and can exert a considerable crystallization pressure on the surrounding hardened cement paste (HCP). This leads to the expansion of concrete, to its cracking, and it can ultimately lead to the ruin of the affected structure. The characteristic feature of delayed ettringite formation (DEF) is a random honeycomb cracking pattern similar to this of the alkali-silica reaction (ASR). In fact, this typical crack pattern is common to all expansive internal reactions and also to restrained shrinkage where a rigid substrate or a dense rebar network prevents the movements of a superficial concrete layer. DEF is also known as internal sulfate attack (ISA). External sulfate attack (ESA) also involves ettringite (AFt) formation and deleterious expansion with the same harmful symptoms but requires an external source of sulfate anions in the surrounding terrains or environment. To avoid DEF or ISA reactions, the best way is to use a low C_{3}A (tri-calcium aluminate) cement precluding the formation of ettringite (AFt). Sulfate resisting (SR) cements have also a low content in Al_{2}O_{3}. DEF, or ISA, only affects the hardened cement paste (HCP) and leaves intact the aggregates.

DEF is exacerbated at high pH in cement with a too high content in alkalis and therefore in hydroxides. This is caused by the transformation of ettringite (AFt) into aluminoferrite monosulfate (AFm) under the action of the hydroxyl anions (OH^{–}) as schematized as follows:

AFt + OH^{–} → AFm

The complete reaction can be derived from the molecular formulas of the reagents and products involved in the reaction. This reaction favors the dissolution of AFt and the formation of AFm. When combined, it is an aggravating factor of the harmful effect of too high temperatures. To minimize DEF, the use of low-alkali cements is also recommended. The detrimental crystallization of ettringite (AFt) preferentially occurs when concrete is exposed to water infiltrations and that the pH decreases due to the leaching of the (OH^{–}) ions: the reaction is reversed as when temperature decreases.

=== External sulfate attacks (ESA) ===
Sulfates in solution in contact with concrete can cause chemical changes to the cement, which can cause significant microstructural effects leading to the weakening of the cement binder (chemical sulfate attack). Sulfate solutions can also cause damage to porous cementitious materials through crystallization and recrystallization (salt attack). Sulfates and sulfites are ubiquitous in the natural environment and are present from many sources, including gypsum (calcium sulfate) often present as an additive in 'blended' cements which include fly ash and other sources of sulfate. With the notable exception of barium sulfate, most sulfates are slightly to highly soluble in water. These include acid rain where sulfur dioxide in the airshed is dissolved in rainfall to produce sulfurous acid. In lightning storms, the dioxide is oxidized to trioxide making the residual sulfuric acid in rainfall even more highly acidic. Concrete sewage infrastructure is most commonly attacked by sulfuric acid and sulfate anions arising from the oxidation of sulfide present in the sewage. Sulfides are formed when sulfate-reducing bacteria present in sewer mains reduce the ubiquitous sulfate ions present in water drains into hydrogen sulfide gas (H_{2}S). H_{2}S is volatile and released from water in the sewage atmosphere. It dissolves in a thin film of water condensed onto the wall of the sewer ducts where it is also accompanied by hydrogeno-sulfide (HS^{−}) and sulfide (S^{2−}) ions. When H_{2}S and HS^{−} anions are further exposed to atmospheric oxygen or to oxygenated stormwater, they are readily oxidized and produce sulfuric acid (in fact acidic hydrogen ions accompanied by sulfate and bisulfate ions) according to the respective oxidation reactions:

H_{2}S + 2 O_{2} → 2 H^{+} + SO^{2−}_{4}

or,

HS^{−} + 2 O_{2} → HSO^{−}_{4}

The corrosion often present in the crown (top) of concrete sewers is directly attributable to this process – known as crown rot corrosion.

=== Thaumasite form of sulfate attack (TSA) ===
Thaumasite is a calcium silicate mineral, containing Si atoms in unusual octahedral configuration, with chemical formula Ca_{3}Si(OH)_{6}(CO_{3})(SO_{4})·12H_{2}O, also sometimes more simply written as CaSiO_{3}·CaCO_{3}·CaSO_{4}·15H_{2}O.

Thaumasite is formed under special conditions in the presence of sulfate ions in concrete containing, or exposed to, a source of carbonate anions such as limestone aggregates, or finely milled limestone filler (CaCO_{3}). Bicarbonate anions (HCO^{−}_{3}) dissolved in groundwater may also contribute to the reaction. The detrimental reaction proceeds at the expense of calcium silicate hydrates (C-S-H, with dashes denoting here their non-stoichiometry) present in the hardened cement paste (HCP). The thaumasite form of sulfate attack (TSA) is a particular type of very destructive sulfate attack. C-S-H are the "glue" in the hardened cement paste filling the interstices between the concrete aggregates. As the TSA reaction consumes the silicates of the "cement glue", it can lead to a harmful decohesion and a softening of concrete. Expansion and cracking are more rarely observed. Unlike the common sulfate attack, in which the calcium hydroxide (portlandite) and calcium aluminate hydrates react with sulfates to respectively form gypsum and ettringite (an expansive phase), in the case of TSA the C-S-H ensuring the cohesion of HCP and aggregates are destroyed. As a consequence, even concrete containing low-C_{3}A sulfate-resisting Portland cement may be affected.

TSA is sometimes easily recognizable on the field when examining the altered concrete. TSA-affected concrete becomes powdery and can be dug with a scoop, or even scrapped with the fingers. Concrete decohesion is very characteristic of TSA.

TSA was first identified during the years 1990 in England in the United Kingdom in the foundation piles of bridges of the motorway M5 located in the Kimmeridgian marls. These marls are a mixture of clay and limestone sedimented under anoxic conditions and are rich in pyrite (FeS_{2}, a Fe^{2+} disulfide). Once these marls were excavated, pyrite was exposed to atmospheric oxygen or oxygen-rich infiltration water and rapidly oxidized. Pyrite oxidation produces sulfuric acid. In its turn, H_{2}SO_{4} reacts with portlandite (present in the hardened cement paste, HCP) and calcite (CaCO_{3} (present in limestone aggregates or in carbonated HCP). The strong acidification of the medium caused by pyrite oxidation releases bicarbonate ions (HCO^{−}_{3}) or carbon dioxide (CO_{2}) along with calcium (Ca^{2+}) and sulfate ions (SO^{2−}_{4}).

Full pyrite oxidation can be schematized as:

2 FeS_{2} + 7.5 O_{2} + 4 H_{2}O → Fe_{2}O_{3} + 4 H_{2}SO_{4}

The sulfuric acid released by pyrite oxidation then reacts with portlandite (Ca(OH_{2})) present in the hardened cement paste to give gypsum:

H_{2}SO_{4} + Ca(OH)_{2} → CaSO_{4} · 2H_{2}O

When concrete also contains limestone aggregates or a filler addition, H_{2}SO_{4} reacts with calcite (CaCO_{3}) and water to also form gypsum while releasing CO_{2}:

H_{2}SO_{4} + CaCO_{3} + H_{2}O → CaSO_{4} · 2H_{2}O + CO_{2}

Gypsum is relatively soluble in water (~ 1 – 2 g/L), so there is plenty of calcium and sulfates ions available for TSA.

Simultaneously, carbonic acid (H_{2}O + CO_{2} ⇌ H_{2}CO_{3}) dissolves calcite to form soluble calcium bicarbonate:

H_{2}O + CO_{2} + CaCO_{3} → Ca(HCO_{3})_{2}

So, when all the chemical ingredients necessary to react with C-S-H from the hardened cement paste in concrete are present together the TSA reaction can occur. When grounds rich in pyrite, such as many clays or marls, are excavated for civil engineering works, the strong acidification produced by pyrite oxidation is the powerful driving force triggering TSA because it frees up and mobilizes all the ions needed to attack C-S-H and to form thaumasite (CaSiO_{3}·CaCO_{3}·CaSO_{4} · 15H_{2}O).

TSA is favored by a low temperature, although it can be encountered at higher temperature in warm areas. The reason is to be found in the retrograde solubility of most of the ingredients needed for the TSA reaction. Indeed, the solubility of dissolved carbon dioxide (CO_{2}), portlandite (Ca(OH)_{2}), calcite (CaCO_{3}), and gypsum (CaSO_{4}·2H_{2}O), increases when the temperature is lowered. This is because the dissolution reactions of these mineral species are exothermic and release heat. A lower temperature facilitates the heat release and therefore favors the exothermic reaction. Only the solubility of silica (from C-S-H) increases with temperature because silica dissolution is an endothermic process which requires heat to proceed.

=== Calcium leaching ===
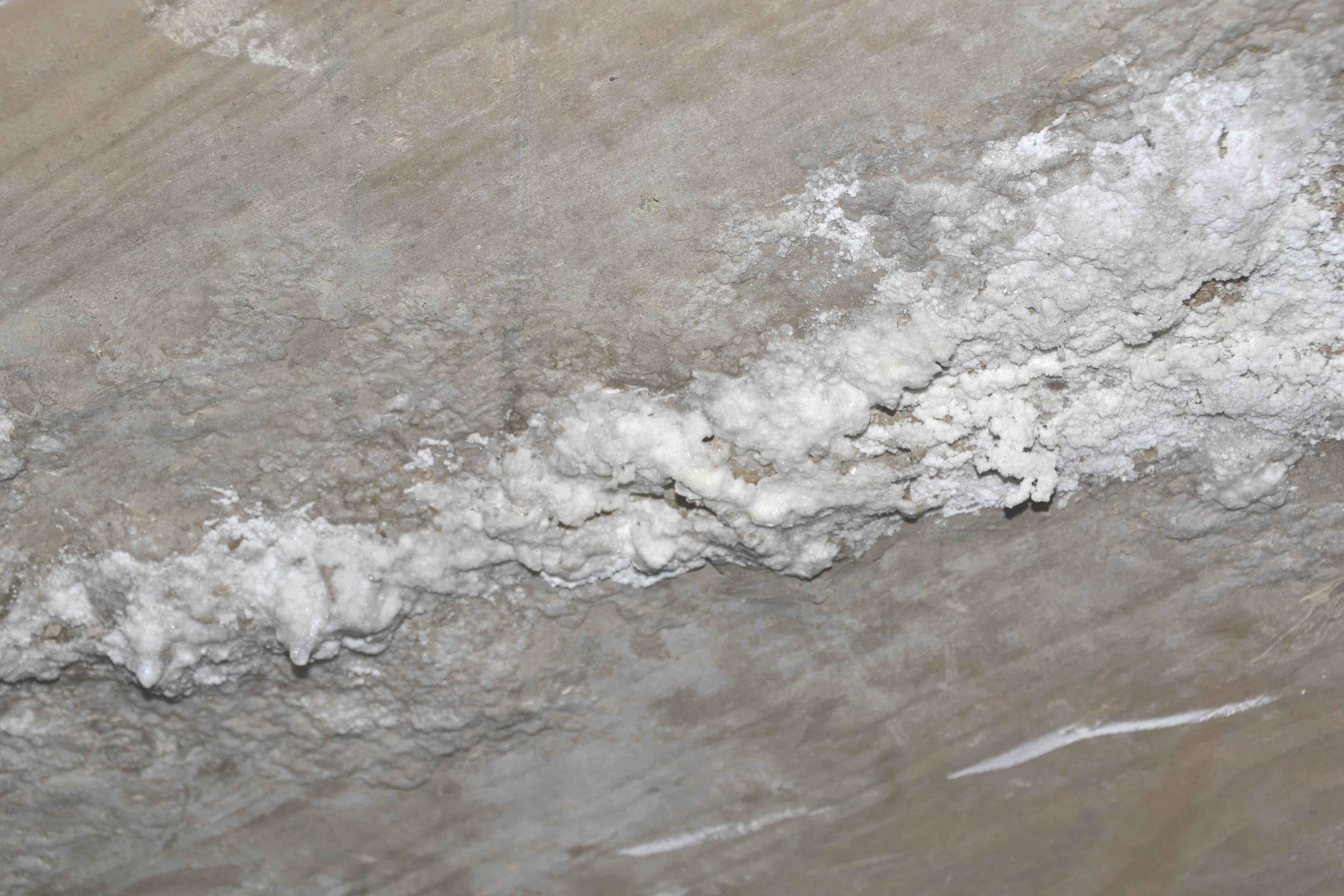
Example of secondary efflorescence in parking garage exposed to diluted road salt from vehicles entering the garage during winter.

When water flows through cracks present in concrete, water may dissolve various minerals present in the hardened cement paste or in the aggregates, if the solution is unsaturated with respect to them. Dissolved ions, such as calcium (Ca^{2+}), are leached out and transported in solution some distance. If the physico-chemical conditions prevailing in the seeping water evolve with distance along the water path and water becomes supersaturated with respect to certain minerals, they can further precipitate, making calthemite deposits (predominately calcium carbonate) inside the cracks, or at the concrete outer surface. This process can cause the self-healing of fractures in particular conditions.

Fagerlund (2000) determined that, “About 15% of the lime has to be dissolved before strength is affected. This corresponds to about 10% of the cement weight, or almost all of the initially formed Ca(OH)_{2}.” Therefore, a large amount of "calcium hydroxide" (Ca(OH)_{2}) must be leached from the concrete before structural integrity is affected. The other issue however is that leaching away Ca(OH)_{2} may allow the corrosion of reinforcing steel to affect structural integrity.

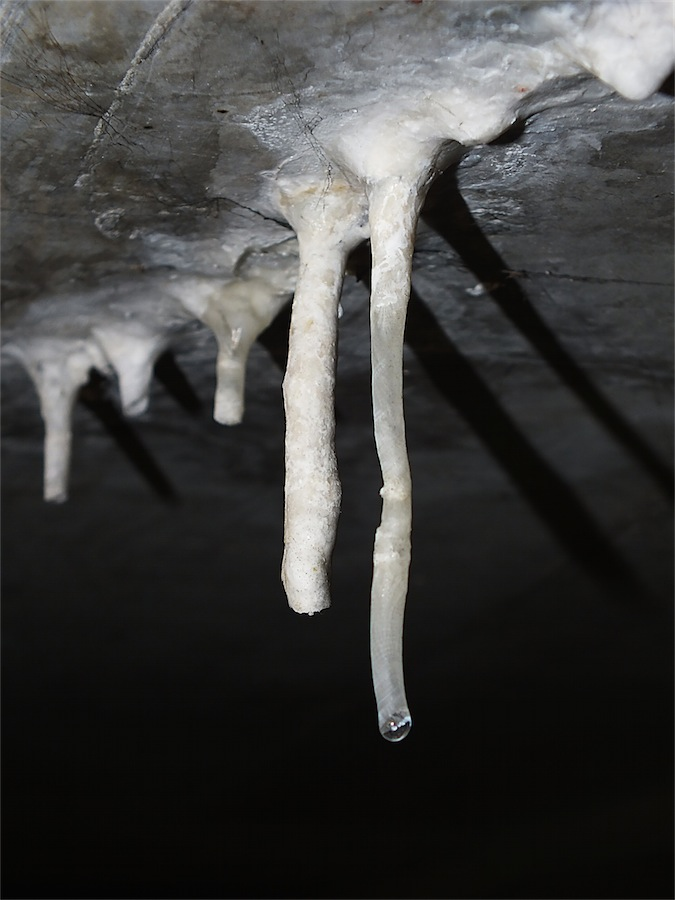
Stalactites growing beneath a concrete structure as a result of calcium hydroxide being leached from concrete and deposited as calcium carbonate; creating calthemite forms beneath the structure.

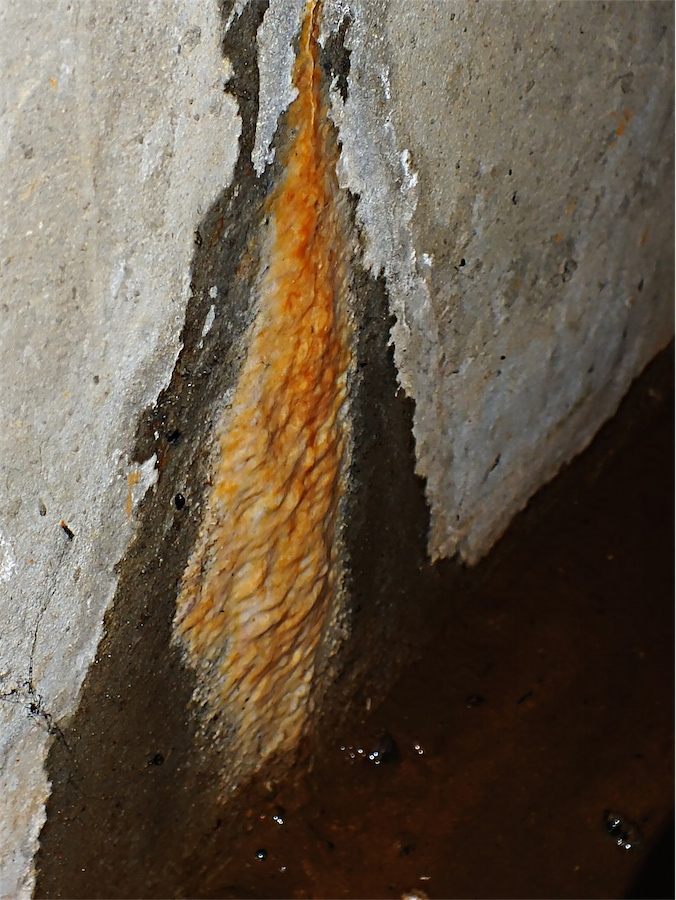
Calthemite flowstone-stained orange from rust, from steel reinforcing bar, deposited along with calcium carbonate.

==== Decalcification ====
Within set concrete there remains some free "calcium hydroxide" (Ca(OH)_{2}), which can further dissociate to form Ca^{2+} and hydroxide (OH^{−}) ions". Any water which finds a seepage path through micro cracks and air voids present in concrete, will readily carry the (Ca(OH)_{2}) and Ca^{2+} (depending on solution pH and chemical reaction at the time) to the underside of the structure where leachate solution contacts the atmosphere. Carbon dioxide (CO_{2}) from the atmosphere readily diffuses into the leachate and causes a chemical reaction, which precipitates (deposits) calcium carbonate (CaCO_{3}) on the outside of the concrete structure. Consisting primarily of CaCO_{3} this secondary deposit derived from concrete is known as "calthemite" and can mimic the shapes and forms of cave "speleothems", such as stalactites, stalagmites, flowstone etc. Other trace elements such as iron from rusting reinforcing steel bars may be transported and deposited by the leachate at the same time as the CaCO_{3}. This may colour the calthemites orange or red.

The chemistry involving the leaching of calcium hydroxide from concrete can facilitate the growth of calthemites up to ≈200 times faster than cave speleothems due to the different chemical reactions involved. The sight of calthemite is a visual sign that calcium is being leached from the concrete structure and the concrete is gradually degrading.

In very old concrete where the calcium hydroxide has been leached from the leachate seepage path, the chemistry may revert to that similar to "speleothem" chemistry in limestone cave. This is where carbon dioxide enriched rain or seepage water forms a weak carbonic acid, which leaches calcium carbonate (CaCO_{3}) from within the concrete structure and carries it to the underside of the structure. When it contacts the atmosphere, carbon dioxide degasses and calcium carbonate is precipitated to create calthemite deposits, which mimic the shapes and forms of speleothems. This degassing chemistry is not common in concrete structures as the leachate can often find new paths through the concrete to access free calcium hydroxide and this reverts the chemistry to that previously mentioned where CO_{2} is the reactant.

=== Sea water attack ===
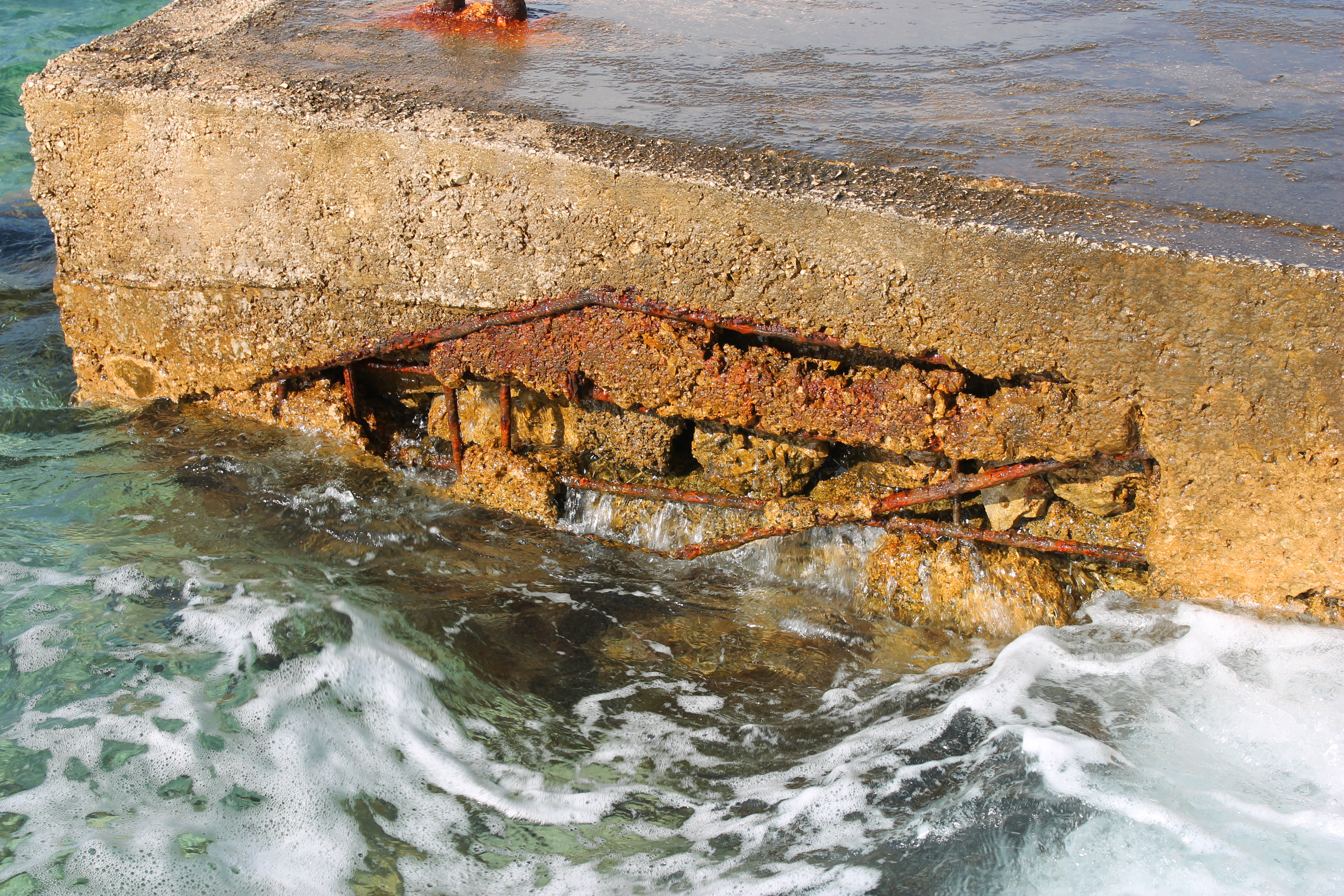
Concrete heavily degradated after long-time exposition to seawater in the tidal zone

Concrete exposed to seawater is susceptible to its corrosive effects. The effects are more pronounced above the tidal zone than where the concrete is permanently submerged. In the submerged zone, magnesium and hydrogen carbonate ions precipitate a layer of brucite (magnesium hydroxide: Mg(OH)_{2}), about 30 micrometers thick, on which a slower deposition of calcium carbonate as aragonite occurs. These mineral layers somewhat protect the concrete from other processes, which includes attack by magnesium, chloride and sulfate ions and carbonatation. Above the water surface, mechanical damage may occur by erosion by waves themselves or sand and gravel they carry, and by crystallization of salts from water soaking into the concrete pores and then drying up. Pozzolanic cements and cements using more than 60 wt.% of blast furnace slags as cementitious material are more resistant to seawater than pure Portland cement. Seawater attack presents aspects of both chloride and sulfate attacks.

== Effects of bacterial activity ==
Bacteria themselves do not have noticeable effect on concrete. However, sulfate-reducing bacteria (SRB) in untreated sewage water tend to produce hydrogen sulfide (H_{2}S), which is then oxidized in sulfuric acid (H_{2}SO_{4}) by atmospheric oxygen (abiotic reaction) and by aerobic bacteria present in biofilm (biotic reaction) on the concrete surface above the water level. The sulfuric acid dissolves the carbonates in the hardened cement paste (HCP), and also calcium hydroxide (portlandite: Ca(OH)_{2}) and calcium silicate hydrate (CaO·SiO_{2}·nH_{2}O), and causes strength loss, as well as producing sulfates which are harmful to concrete.

H_{2}SO_{4} + Ca(OH)_{2} → CaSO_{4} + 2 H_{2}O
H_{2}SO_{4} + CaO·SiO_{2}·n H_{2}O → CaSO_{4} + H_{2}SiO_{3} + n H_{2}O

In each case the soft expansive and water-soluble corrosion product of gypsum (CaSO_{4}) is formed. Gypsum is easily washed away in wastewater causing a loss of concrete aggregate and exposing fresh material to acid attack.

Concrete floors lying on ground that contains pyrite (iron(II) disulfide) are also at risk. As a preventive measure sewage may be pretreated to increase pH or oxidize or precipitate the sulfides in order to minimize the activity of sulfide-reducing bacteria.

As bacteria often prefer to adhere to the surfaces of solids than to remain into suspension in water (planktonic bacteria), the biofilms formed by sessile (i.e., fixed) bacteria are often the place where they are the most active. Biofilms made of multiple layers (like an onion) of dead and living bacteria protect the living ones from the harsh conditions often prevailing in water outside biofilm. Biofilms developing on the already exposed surface of metallic elements encased in concrete can also contribute to accelerate their corrosion (differential aeration and formation of anodic zones at the surface of the metal). Sulfides produced by the SRB bacteria can also induce stress corrosion cracking in steel and other metals.

== Physical damage ==
=== Construction defects ===
Damage can occur during the casting and de-shuttering processes. For instance, the corners of beams can be damaged during the removal of shuttering because they are less effectively compacted by means of vibration (improved by using form-vibrators). Other physical damage can be caused by the use of steel shuttering without base plates. The steel shuttering pinches the top surface of a concrete slab due to the weight of the next slab being constructed.

Concrete slabs, block walls and pipelines are susceptible to cracking during ground settlement, seismic tremors or other sources of vibration, and also from expansion and contraction during adverse temperature changes.

=== Various types of concrete shrinkage ===
Chemical shrinkage (self-desiccation)

The cement hydration process consumes water molecules. The sum of the volumes of the hydration products present in the hardened cement paste is smaller than the sum of the volumes of the reacting mineral phases present in the cement clinker. Therefore, the volume of the fresh and very young concrete undergoes a contraction due to the hydration reaction: it is what is called "chemical shrinkage" or "self-desiccation". It is not a problem as long as the very fresh concrete is still in a liquid, or a sufficiently plastic, state and can easily accommodate volume changes (contraction).

Plastic shrinkage

Later in the setting phase, when the fresh concrete becomes more viscous and starts to harden, water loss due to unwanted evaporation can cause "plastic shrinkage". This occurs when concrete is placed under hot conditions, e.g. in the summer, and not sufficiently protected against evaporation. Cracks often develop above reinforcement bars because the contraction of concrete is locally restrained at this level and the still setting and weakly resistant concrete cannot freely shrink.

Cracks due to a poor curing (loss of water at early age)

The curing of concrete when it continues to harden after its initial setting and progressively develops its mechanical strength is a critical phase to avoid unwanted cracks in concrete. Depending on the temperature (summer or winter conditions) and thus on the cement hydration kinetics controlling the setting and hardening rate of concrete, curing time can require a few days only (summer) or up to two weeks (winter). It is then critical to avoid losses of water by evaporation because water is necessary for continuing the slow cement hydration. Water loss at this stage aggravates concrete shrinkage and can cause unacceptable cracks to develop. Cracks form in case of a too short, or too poor, curing when young concrete has not yet developed a sufficient early strength to withstand tensile stress caused by undesirable and premature drying. Crack development occurs when early-age concrete is insufficiently protected against desiccation and too much water evaporates with heat because of unfavorable meteorological conditions: e.g., high temperature, direct solar insolation, dry air, low relative humidity, and high wind speed during summer, or in hot conditions. Curing is intended to maintain moist conditions at the surface of concrete. It can be done by letting the formworks in place for a longer time, or by applying a hydrophobic thin film of an oily product (curing compound) at the concrete surface (e.g., for large slabs or rafts) to minimize water evaporation.

Drying shrinkage

After sufficient setting and hardening of concrete, the progressive loss of capillary water is also responsible for the "drying shrinkage". It is a continuous and long-term process occurring later during the concrete's life when under dry conditions the larger pores of concrete are no longer completely saturated by water.

Thermal cracks

When concrete is subject to an excessive temperature increase during its setting and hardening as in massive concrete structures from where cement hydration heat cannot easily escape (semi-adiabatic conditions), the temperature gradients and the differential volume changes can also cause the formation of thermal cracks and fissures. To minimize them a slowly-setting cement (CEM III, with blast furnace slags) is preferred to a quickly setting cement (CEM I: Portland cement). Pouring concrete under colder conditions (e.g., during the night, or in the winter), or using cold water and ice mixed with cooled aggregates to prepare concrete, may also contribute to minimizing thermal cracks.

=== Restrained shrinkage ===
When a concrete structure is heavily reinforced, the very dense rebar network can block the contraction movement of the protecting concrete cover located above the external layer of reinforcement bars due to the natural drying shrinkage process. As a consequence, a network of fissures with the characteristic honeycomb pattern also typical for the cracks resulting from the expansive chemical reactions (ASR, DEF, ESA) forms.

The formation of fissures in the concrete cover above the reinforcement bars represents a preferential pathway for the ingress of water and aggressive agents such as CO_{2} (lowering of pH around the rebar) and chloride anions (pitting corrosion) into concrete. The physical formation of cracks therefore favors the chemical degradation of concrete and aggravates steel corrosion. Physical and chemical degradation processes are intimately coupled, and the presence of water infiltrations also accelerates the formation of expansive products of harmful swelling chemical reactions (iron corrosion products, ASR, DEF, ISA, ESA).

Different approaches and methods have been developed to attempt to quantitatively estimate the influence of cracks in concrete structures on carbonation and chloride penetration. Their aim is to avoid underestimating the penetration depth of these harmful chemical agents and to calculate a sufficient thickness for the concrete cover to protect the rebar against corrosion during the whole service life of the concrete structure.

== Freeze-thaw cycles ==
In winter conditions, or in cold climates, when the temperature falls below 0 °Celsius, the crystallization of ice in the pores of concrete is also a physical mechanism (change of state) responsible for the volumetric expansion of a substance exerting a high tensile strength inside the concrete matrix. When the tensile strength of concrete is exceeded, cracks appear. Adding an air entrainment agent during the mixing of fresh concrete induces the formation of tiny air bubbles in the fresh concrete slurry. This creates numerous small air-filled micro-cavities in the hardened concrete serving as empty volume reserve to accommodate the volumetric expansion of ice and delays the moment tensile stress will develop. Air entrainment makes concrete more workable during placement, and increases its durability when hardened, particularly in climates subject to freeze-thaw cycles.

== Mechanical damages ==
Overload, shocks and vibrations (bridges, roads submitted to intense truck traffic...) can induce mechanical stress and deformations in concrete structures and be responsible for the mechanical degradation of concrete. Beside the long-term drying shrinkage of concrete, pre-stressed and post-tensioned civil engineering structures (bridges, primary containment domes of nuclear power plants can also undergo slow concrete creep and deformation.

== Thermal damages ==
Due to its low thermal conductivity, a layer of concrete is frequently used for fireproofing of steel structures. However, concrete itself may be damaged by fire, with one notable example being the 1996 Channel Tunnel fire where fire damage extended along several hundred meters of the tunnel's length. For this reason, common fire testing standards, such as ASTM E119, do not permit fire testing of cementitious products unless the relative humidity inside the cementitious product is at or below 75%. Otherwise, concrete can be subject to significant spalling.

Up to about 300 °C, the concrete undergoes normal thermal expansion. Above that temperature, shrinkage occurs due to water loss; however, the aggregate continues expanding, which causes internal stresses. Up to about 500 °C, the major structural changes are carbonatation and coarsening of pores. At 573 °C, quartz undergoes rapid expansion due to phase transition, and at 900 °C calcite starts shrinking due to decomposition. At 450-550 °C the cement hydrate decomposes, yielding calcium oxide. Calcium carbonate decomposes at about 600 °C. Rehydration of the calcium oxide on cooling of the structure causes expansion, which can cause damage to material which withstood fire without falling apart. Concrete in buildings that experienced a fire and were left standing for several years shows extensive degree of carbonatation from carbon dioxide which is reabsorbed.

Concrete exposed to up to 100 °C is normally considered as healthy. The parts of a concrete structure that is exposed to temperatures above approximately 300 °C (dependent of water/cement ratio) will most likely get a pink color. Over approximately 600 °C the concrete will turn light grey, and over approximately 1000 °C it turns yellow-brown. One rule of thumb is to consider all pink colored concrete as damaged that should be removed.

Fire will expose the concrete to gases and liquids that can be harmful to the concrete, among other salts and acids that occur when gases produced by a fire come into contact with water.

If concrete is exposed to very high temperatures very rapidly, explosive spalling of the concrete can result. In a very hot, very quick fire the water inside the concrete will boil before it evaporates. The steam inside the concrete exerts expansive pressure and can initiate and forcibly expel a spall.

== Radiation damages ==
Exposure of concrete structures to neutrons and gamma radiation in nuclear power plants, and high-flux material testing reactors, can induce radiation damage to their concrete structural components. Paramagnetic defects and optical centers are easily formed, but very high fluxes are necessary to displace a sufficiently high number of atoms in the crystal lattice of the minerals present in concrete before significant mechanical damage is observed.

However, neutron irradiation with a very high neutron fluence (number of neutrons per unit of cross-section area: neutron/cm^{2}) is known to render amorphous a fraction of the quartz present in some concrete aggregates. This amorphization process is also called metamictization. Metamict quartz with its disordered lattice structure is prone to alkali–silica reaction and can thus be responsible of harmful chemical expansion in the concrete of nuclear containment structures.

== Repairs and strengthening ==
It may be necessary to repair a concrete structure following damage (e.g. due to age, chemical attack, fire, impact, movement or reinforcement corrosion). Strengthening may be necessary if the structure is weakened (e.g. due to design or construction errors, excessive loading, or because of a change of use).

=== Repair techniques ===
The first step should always be an investigation to determine the cause of the deterioration. The general principles of repair include arresting and preventing further degradation; treating exposed steel reinforcement; and filling fissures or holes caused by cracking or left after the loss of spalled or damaged concrete.

Various techniques are available for the repair, protection and rehabilitation of concrete structures, and specifications for repair principals have been defined systematically. The selection of the appropriate approach will depend on the cause of the initial damage (e.g. impact, excessive loading, movement, corrosion of the reinforcement, chemical attack, or fire) and whether the repair is to be fully load bearing or simply cosmetic.

Concrete stitching employs metal staples or stitches to restore structural integrity to cracked concrete surfaces. This method applies torque across the crack, effectively transferring load and tension to stabilize and strengthen the affected area. Recognized for its simplicity and minimal disruption, concrete stitching is widely utilized in essential infrastructures such as bridges and buildings, significantly prolonging the lifespan of concrete structures by preventing crack propagation.

Repair principles which do not improve the strength or performance of concrete beyond its original (undamaged) condition include replacement and restoration of concrete after spalling and delamination; strengthening to restore structural load-bearing capacity; and increasing resistance to physical or mechanical attack.

Repair principles for arresting and preventing further degradation include control of anodic areas; cathodic protection, cathodic control; increasing resistivity; preserving or restoring passivity; increasing resistance to chemical attack; protection against ingress of adverse agents; and moisture control.

Techniques for filling holes left by the removal of spalled or damaged concrete include mortar repairs; flowing concrete repairs and sprayed concrete repairs. The filling of cracks, fissures or voids in concrete for structural purposes (restoration of strength and load-bearing capability), or non-structural reasons (flexible repairs where further movement is expected, or alternately to resist water and gas permeation) typically involves the injection of low viscosity resins or grouts based on epoxy, PU or acrylic resins, or micronised cement slurries.

One novel proposal for the repair of cracks is to use bacteria. BacillaFilla is a genetically engineered bacterium designed to repair damaged concrete, filling in the cracks, and making them whole again.

=== Strengthening techniques ===
Various techniques are available for strengthening concrete structures, to increase the load-carrying capacity or else to improve the in-service performance. These include increasing the concrete cross-section and adding material such as steel plate or fiber composites to enhance the tensile capacity or increase the confinement of the concrete for improved compression capacity.

In Switzerland, reinforced concrete in highway infrastructure is often protected with a high-performance concrete called CFUP (also known as BFUP).

== See also ==
- Calthemite
- Concrete fracture analysis
- Corrosion of rebar
- Electrical resistivity measurement of concrete
- Interfacial Transition Zone (ITZ)
- Pitting corrosion of rebar
- Reinforced concrete structures durability
