= Concrete cancer =

Concrete cancer may refer to:

- Rebar corrosion and spalling of the concrete cover above rebar caused by the rust expansion and accelerated by chloride attack and pitting corrosion of the steel reinforcements.
- Alkali–silica reaction (ASR), also known as alkali-aggregate reaction (AAR), when reactive amorphous silica aggregates exposed to alkaline conditions (high pH) swell inside the concrete matrix leading to the development of a network of cracks.

It may also refer to:

- Sulfate attacks, an hat appellation covering different concrete degradation mechanisms:
  - Delayed ettringite formation (DEF), also known as internal sulfate attack (ISA) when the temperature of fresh concrete exceeds 65 °C during its setting and hardening;
  - External sulfate attack (ESA), and;
  - Thaumasite form of sulfate attack (TSA).
