= Entrainment =

Entrainment may refer to:

- Air entrainment, the intentional creation of tiny air bubbles in concrete
- Brainwave entrainment, the practice of entraining one's brainwaves to a desired frequency
- Entrainment (biomusicology), the synchronization of organisms to an external rhythm
- Entrainment (chronobiology), the alignment of a circadian system's period and phase to the period and phase of an external rhythm
- Entrainment (engineering), the entrapment of one substance by another substance
- Entrainment (hydrodynamics), the movement of one fluid by another
- Entrainment (meteorology), a phenomenon of the atmosphere
- Entrainment (physical geography), the process by which surface sediment is incorporated into a fluid flow
- Entrainment (physics), the process whereby two interacting oscillating systems assume the same period
- Lexical entrainment, the process in conversational linguistics of the subject adopting the terms of their interlocutor
- Photoentrainment, the synchronization by light of organisms to environment rhythm

== See also ==
- "That's Entrainment", a Van Morrison song
- Entrains-sur-Nohain, a commune in the Nièvre department in central France
