= Humid heat =

The combined effect of temperature and humidity

A man wipes his sweat while running during a humid heatwave in Hong Kong.

Humid heat is the combined effect of temperature and humidity. It is generally assessed relative to local climate conditions using measures that account for both temperature and moisture, such as wet-bulb temperature or the heat index. Periods of humid heat that last several days or longer are known as humid heatwaves. These events have become more frequent and intense since the late twentieth century.

Humid heat is influenced by atmospheric circulation and land surface conditions. Climate patterns such as the El Niño–Southern Oscillation, seasonal monsoons, rainfall and soil moisture affect the severity, location and timing of humid heat events.

Humid heat can place greater stress on the human body than dry heat at the same temperature. High humidity makes it harder for sweat to evaporate, reducing the body's ability to cool itself. This can lead to heat exhaustion, heat stroke and death, particularly among vulnerable groups. Humid heat also reduces labour productivity by limiting the conditions in which people can work safely. This can lead to substantial losses in working hours and economic output in hot, humid climates.

== Historical development ==
The relationship between heat, humidity and heat stress has a long history which predates climate science. By 1905, research into heat, humidity and heatstroke showed that in high temperature conditions, evaporation of sweat is a key means of heat loss. This understanding helped establish the connection between wet-bulb temperature and human physiology. In 1947, Brunt, a meteorologist by training, applied his knowledge of thermodynamics to advance the connection between humidity and heat stress. He used an energy balance concept to model how metabolic heat production by the human body is balanced by the net exchange of radiative energy, sensible and latent heat fluxes with the environment. Importantly he defined a climate classification based on temperature and humidity which identified limiting conditions for the human body.

By the mid-20th century, the importance of humidity to human heat tolerance and the usefulness of wet-bulb measurements were established. In the 1950s, wet-bulb global temperature was developed by the US military to provide an environmental heat stress measure for use in a work and exercise setting, the motivation being to reduce the risk of heat illness during military training. In 1979, Steadman developed a measure of apparent temperature for use in public meteorology. This measure was based on human physiology and clothing, translating physical measurements of temperature and humidity into a meteorologically equivalent temperature. In 1984 he generalised his work proposing a universal scale of apparent temperature. The heat index used by the National Oceanic and Atmospheric Administration (NOAA) is directly derived from the work of Steadman. More recently, the UTCI was developed to provide an apparent temperature index which uses more advanced models of thermoregulation.

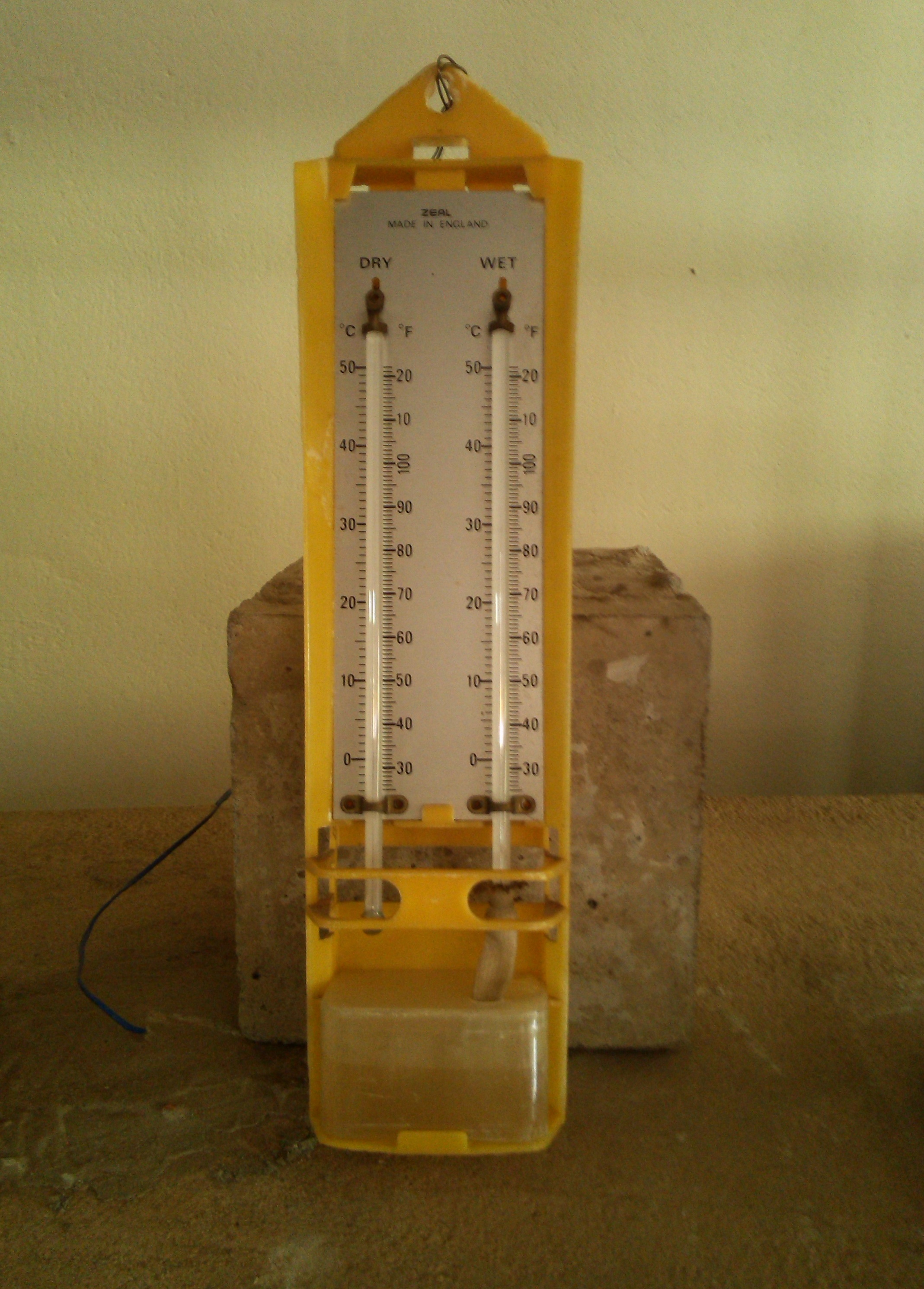
A psychrometer is used for measuring atmospheric temperature and humidity. Historically, wet-bulb temperature was measured using a thermometer with wet muslin covering the bulb. If the air flowing over the bulb is humid, the moisture in the wet muslin evaporates slower, registering a higher temperature on the wet-bulb thermometer.

In 2010, Sherwood and Huber brought wet-bulb temperature to modern climate science using it to consider human adaptability based on physiological limits under climate warming.

== Definitions and metrics ==
There is no single definition of humid heat. Most national and international heatwave definitions are based primarily on high air temperatures relative to the local climate, while humidity is more commonly incorporated into heat health warning systems and heat-stress indices. World Meteorological Organization and World Health Organization heat health guidance describe heatwaves as periods of unusually hot and dry or hot and humid weather lasting at least two or three days. While the definition of humid heat varies between organisations and countries, its interpretation generally involves persistent hot conditions in which humidity contributes substantially to human heat stress.

No single measure of humid heat is applicable to all situations. Wet-bulb temperature and dew point temperature describe physical properties of the atmosphere. Apparent temperature indices such as the heat index and Humidex are intended to represent perceived heat. Other indices, including the wet-bulb globe temperature and Universal Thermal Climate Index (UTCI), incorporate a wider range of environmental or physiological factors. All metrics involve, explicitly or implicitly, different weightings of temperature and moisture. Consequently, the choice of metric can substantially affect the magnitude, location and trends of humid heat as well as its causes.

== Meteorological characteristics ==
=== Temperature and humidity ===
The same level of humid heat can occur under different combinations of temperature and humidity. For example, the same wet-bulb temperature may occur when air temperatures are very high and humidity is moderately elevated, or when temperatures are lower but humidity is much higher.

Temperature and humidity do not always rise together. Evaporation from wet surfaces adds moisture to the air but can also lower temperatures near the ground. In contrast, dry surface conditions can contribute to higher air temperatures. As a result, the most extreme humid-heat conditions do not necessarily occur when air temperatures (dry-bulb temperatures) are at their highest. Dangerous humid heat can also occur at relatively moderate temperatures when humidity is unusually high.

=== Intensity and thresholds ===
Climate studies often identify extreme humid heat by comparing conditions with the local climate. For example, humid-heat extremes may be defined as wet-bulb temperatures that fall within the highest 5% of values recorded at a location. Some definitions combine a relative threshold (e.g.: the 90th percentile of local wet-bulb temperatures) with an absolute threshold (e.g.: a wet-bulb temperature of 24 °C (75 °F)). This approach identifies conditions that are both unusual for a location and warm enough to pose a substantial risk.

Estimates of liveability at varying combinations of air temperature and relative humidity for people over 65 years in outdoor, sun exposed environments.

Relative and absolute thresholds therefore describe different aspects of humid-heat intensity. Conditions that are extreme in a cooler climate may have much lower wet-bulb temperatures than those commonly experienced in warmer tropical and subtropical regions. A wet-bulb temperature of 35 °C (95 °F) is considered a theoretical upper limit for human heat tolerance. However, research shows that at wet-bulb temperatures of around 31 °C (88 °F) heat stress can already exceed the body's ability to regulate its temperature in young, healthy adults. The threshold can be lower for older adults and under hotter, drier conditions.

So far observed wet-bulb temperatures approaching 35°C have occurred only for short periods and in limited areas. However, the duration of humid heat is also important for human health. Prolonged or repeated exposure can leave the body with less time to recover between periods of heat stress.

=== Seasonality and diurnal cycle ===
At mid- and high latitudes, humid-heat extremes occur predominantly during summer and typically peak in the same months as dry-heat extremes. In the tropics and subtropics, the seasonal timing of humid heat reflects regional variations in the coincidence of sufficiently high temperature and atmospheric moisture, and can be closely associated with rainfall and monsoon seasonality. In some tropical regions, humid and dry heat extremes peak several months apart.

Humid-heatwave frequency, duration and intensity diagnosed using wet-bulb temperature, and the peak humid-heatwave season. Regions with no heatwaves are shaded grey

Humid heat also has a distinct diurnal cycle because air temperature and atmospheric moisture often do not reach their daily maxima at the same time. For instance, along parts of the southern Persian Gulf, daily maxima in extreme wet-bulb temperature and heat index frequently occur in the evening or nighttime, associated with the inland movement of moist maritime air. The diurnal cycle also depends on the heat-stress metric: indices such as wet-bulb temperature and the Universal Thermal Climate Index, which account for solar radiation and other environmental factors, tend to show a larger daytime maximum than do wet-bulb temperature or heat index.

=== Geographic distribution ===
Humid heat occurs across much of the world at least occasionally, but the highest absolute wet-bulb temperatures are concentrated in the tropics and subtropics, where sufficiently high air temperatures coincide with abundant atmospheric moisture. This geographical distribution differs markedly from that of dry-heat extremes. The highest dry-bulb temperatures occur predominantly in subtropical deserts and other arid regions, whereas the highest wet-bulb temperatures occur mainly in humid and monsoonal environments, including South and Southeast Asia, the coastal Persian Gulf, northern South America and West Africa.

== Physical processes ==
=== Atmospheric and boundary-layer processes ===
Large-scale atmospheric circulation affects humid heat through horizontal transport of heat and moisture, vertical motion, cloud and convection. Moisture can be advected from oceans and other humid regions, while warm-air advection can increase temperature. Subsidence associated with anticyclonic circulation can contribute to adiabatic warming and increase solar heating at the surface by suppressing clouds and deep convection.

Atmospheric stability can also inhibit the vertical redistribution of warm, moist near-surface air. In some environments, entrainment of relatively dry air from the lower free troposphere suppresses deep convection, allowing high near-surface temperature and moisture to persist despite conditions that might otherwise favour convective development.

Atmospheric boundary layer processes vary strongly through the day and can shape the timing and magnitude of humid heat. During daytime surface heating, the boundary layer typically deepens, mixing moisture evaporated from the surface, and entraining dry air from above, which tends to lower moisture levels. During the evening and overnight, weakening turbulent mixing and wind speeds can allow near-surface humidity to increase as dry-bulb temperature declines. Sea breezes, convective storms, irrigation, and urban heat island and urban dry island interactions further influence humid heat on diurnal timescales and spatial scales of 10-1000 km. Atmospheric stability, subsidence and entrainment can therefore influence humid heat both directly, by altering temperature and moisture, and indirectly, by regulating convection and boundary layer development.

=== Coastal and ocean processes ===
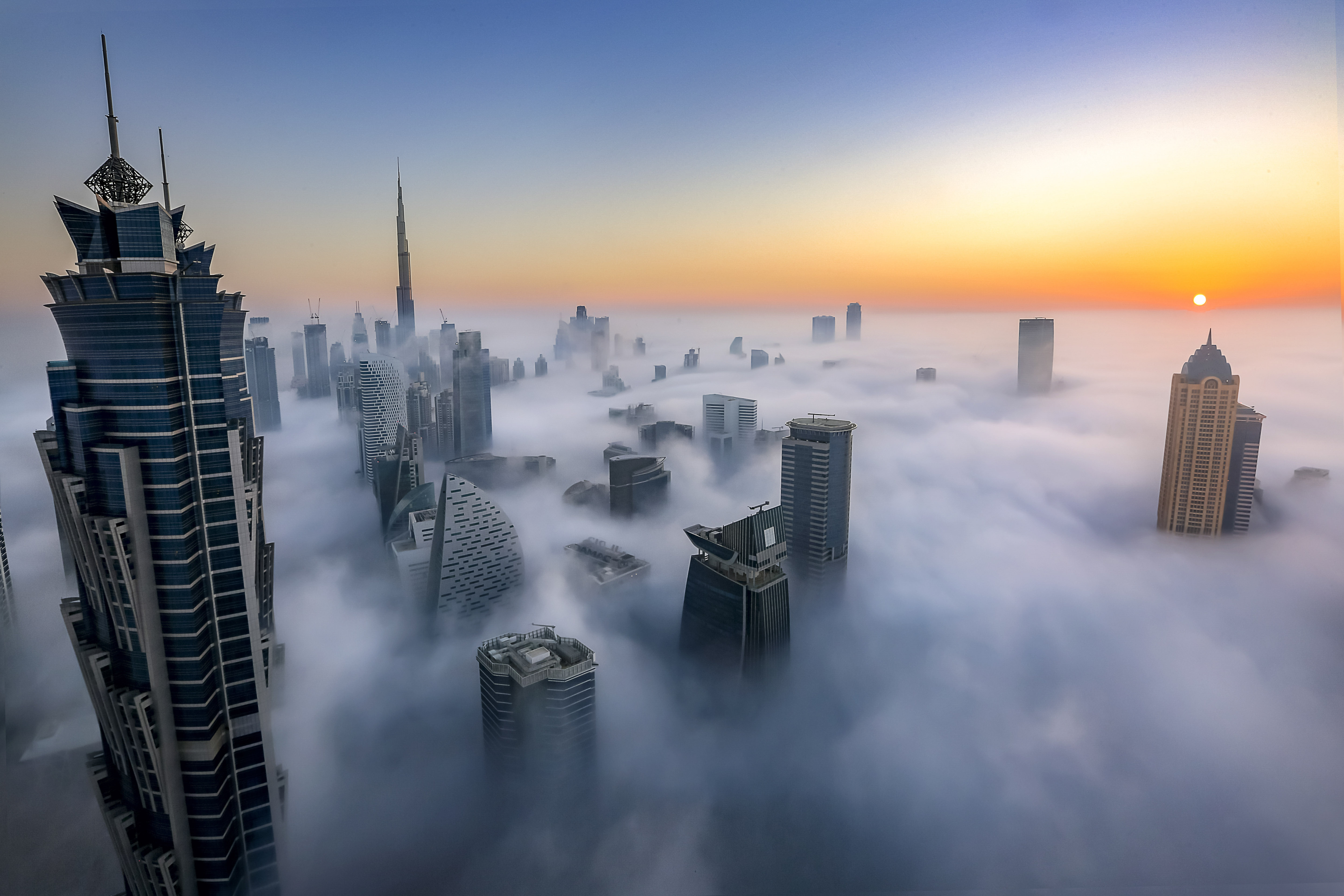
Fog in Dubai, a coastal city on the Arabian Peninsula.

Continuous evaporation over global oceans creates a reservoir of air with high moisture levels. Onshore winds and sea breeze circulations can then transport this air over adjacent land, where it encounters hotter continental air. The arrival of sea air can therefore lower dry-bulb temperature while simultaneously increasing atmospheric moisture sufficiently to maintain or increase wet-bulb temperature, especially when combined with certain atmospheric processes mentioned in the section above. This effect is strongest in the subtropics where temperatures over land are highest; however, it can also occur, to a lesser degree and more episodically, in the mid-latitudes. Typical length scales are 30-50km, but can be 200km or more in exceptional cases such as the eastern Arabian Peninsula.

=== Rainfall and land–atmosphere interactions ===
Land-surface conditions influence humid heat by determining how available surface energy is partitioned between heating the air and driving evaporation. Where soil moisture or vegetation is plentiful, more incoming energy can be used for evapotranspiration, increasing atmospheric moisture while evaporative cooling limits the rise in dry-bulb temperature (i.e. a change in Bowen ratio). Evaporative cooling is reduced over dry surfaces, but sensible heating is favoured, producing higher temperatures but less atmospheric moisture. The effect of land-surface conditions on humid heat therefore depends on the balance between these competing temperature and moisture responses and can vary between distinct regimes of soil-moisture–wet-bulb-temperature coupling.

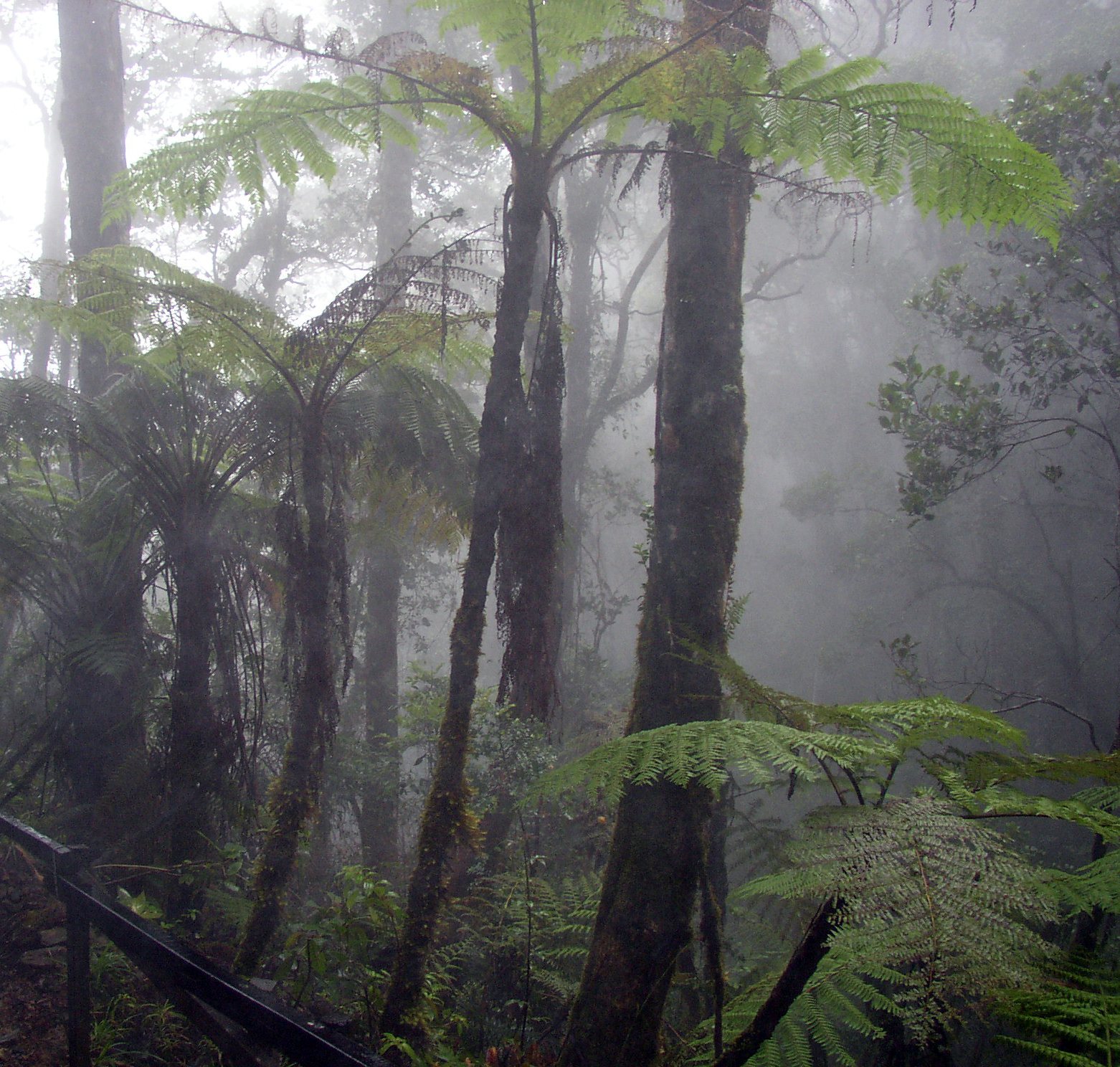
Moisture in a cloud forest on Mount Kinabalu, Borneo.

Across tropical and subtropical regions, the relationship between rainfall and humid heat differs systematically between moisture- and energy-limited environments. In moisture-limited regions where surface evaporation is constrained by moisture availability, which includes most of the equatorial tropics, prior rainfall increases evapotranspiration provided the sky is not prohibitively cloudy. This favours higher humid heat in a shallower boundary layer, even where evaporative cooling reduces air temperature. In energy-limited environments where surface evaporation is constrained by solar radiation, which includes the arid parts of the sub-tropics, higher humid heat is more often preceded by suppressed rainfall and increased solar radiation. Temperatures rise, while sufficient moisture remains available to maintain high humidity.

Variations in soil moisture on spatial scales of tens to hundreds of kilometres can affect boundary layer development through land-atmosphere interactions. High resolution simulations over arid parts of Africa show that humid-heat extremes preferentially occur over wetter soils, generally caused by recent rainfall. The boundaries between wetter and drier soils can generate mesoscale circulations that limit boundary-layer growth, concentrating warm, moist air within a relatively shallow layer and locally increasing wet-bulb temperature. This soil moisture heterogeneity can substantially amplify local humid heat on scales of tens of kilometres .

=== Modes of climate variability ===
Across most of the equitorial tropics interannual variations in humid heat are primarily associated with the El Niño phase of the El Niño–Southern Oscillation (ENSO). In equatorial Southeast Asia, El Niño has been identified as the leading interannual driver of humid-heat variability, with humid-heat risk increasing by about three- to fivefold during El Niño conditions.

In tropical and monsoonal regions, the Madden–Julian Oscillation (MJO) and Boreal Summer Intraseasonal Oscillation (BSISO) can substantially alter the probability of extreme humid heat. In the Persian Gulf and South Asia, wet-bulb temperatures above 28 °C (82 °F) have been found to be almost twice as likely during favourable phases of these oscillations as during unfavourable phases.

The processes involved differ geographically. Around the Persian Gulf, circulation anomalies can weaken climatological winds and favour onshore transport of humid air, whereas in northwestern South Asia high wet-bulb temperatures are associated with positive moisture anomalies during convectively active phases with greater rainfall. Along southeastern India, humid heat can instead be favoured during suppressed monsoon convection, when increased solar radiation promotes higher temperatures while atmospheric moisture remains abundant. In equatorial Southeast Asia, equatorial Kelvin waves have also been identified as a leading mode of daily humid-heat variability alongside the MJO.

== Human health impacts ==
=== Physiological effects ===
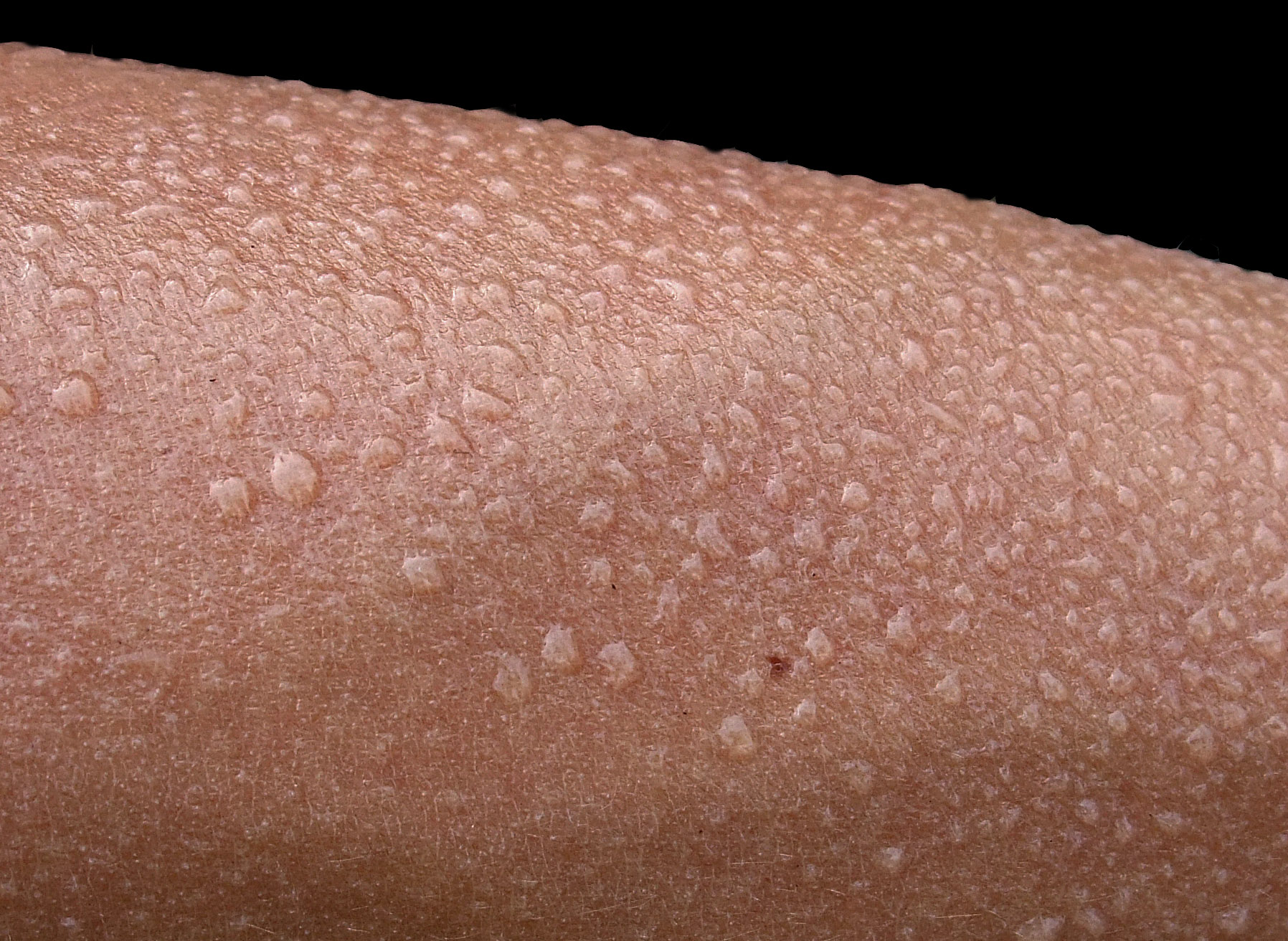
Droplets of sweat on the skin.

Exposure to high temperature places stress on the body's thermoregulatory system because metabolic and environmental heat must be dissipated to maintain a stable core temperature. Heat is transferred from the body to the environment through radiation, convection and evaporation. But as air temperature approaches skin temperature, evaporation of sweat becomes increasingly important for cooling the body. High atmospheric humidity reduces the vapour-pressure gradient between the skin and the surrounding air. This decreases the proportion of sweat that evaporates and therefore reducing the body’s ability to cool itself through evaporative cooling.

=== Human tolerance limits ===
The limit of compensability describes the point at which the body can no longer release enough heat to maintain a stable core temperature. Beyond this point heat stress becomes uncompensable, meaning that the body continues to gain heat despite its cooling responses.

A wet-bulb temperature of 35 °C (95 °F) was historically proposed as a theoretical upper physiological limit for humans, based on theoretical heat-balance considerations. However, laboratory experiments have subsequently shown that this is not a universal threshold. For young, healthy adults undertaking light activity in warm, humid conditions, critical wet-bulb temperatures can be around 30–31 °C (86–88 °F). The conditions that lead to uncompensable heat stress depend on the specific combination of air temperature and humidity.

A man lies down and wears a cooling patch on his forehead during a humid heatwave in Hong Kong.

Age is a particularly important factor. Ageing is associated with reduced sweating, cardiovascular capacity and other changes affecting thermoregulation.

Limits to cooling also vary with environmental conditions. At high temperatures and moderate humidity, physiological sweating capacity can become a limiting factor for human thermoregulation. At more moderate temperatures but high humidity, the air’s limited capacity to absorb additional water vapour can restrict the evaporation of sweat from the skin.

=== Morbidity and mortality ===
Extreme heat increases illness (morbidity) and death (mortality). It can exacerbate cardiovascular, respiratory, renal and other diseases. Most heat-associated deaths are not necessarily caused directly by heat stroke. Instead, heat can place additional strain on physiological systems and contribute to cardiovascular or other causes of death. Prolonged or repeated heat exposure can also affect kidney function, particularly when heavy physical work and dehydration occur together.

Despite the well-established physiological effect of humidity on evaporative cooling, its influence on heat-related mortality at population-level is more complex. Epidemiological studies have often found that measures incorporating humidity do not consistently predict mortality better than air temperature alone. This apparent difference between physiological and epidemiological evidence may reflect differences in the causes of heat-related mortality, acclimatisation and behaviour, the characteristics of vulnerable populations, correlations between temperature and humidity, and limitations in representing individual heat exposure using outdoor meteorological observations. Existing epidemiological evidence is also disproportionately derived from higher-income and extratropical regions rather than the tropical regions where some of the highest humid heat occurs.

The importance of humidity for population health varies geographically. Studies comparing multiple cities indicate that there is no single meteorological heat metric that best predicts mortality in all climates. An analysis of 739 cities in 43 countries found that air temperature predicted heat-related mortality well where temperature and relative humidity were strongly negatively correlated, whereas indices incorporating humidity generally provided greater predictive power where this relationship was weak or positive. Humidity-sensitive indices were particularly relevant in several coastal and large-lake regions, including parts of the United States, Peru, Thailand, Korea and Japan.

Heat-related deaths are projected to increase significantly in the future as more regions start to experience humid heat above human tolerance limits.
