= Behind the Ritual =

Song by Van Morrison

from the album Keep It Simple
- Released: March 17, 2008 (UK); April 1, 2008 (US)
- Length: 6:58
- Label: Exile/Polydor; Exile/Lost Highway
- Songwriter(s): Van Morrison
- Producer(s): Van Morrison

"Behind the Ritual" is a song written by Northern Irish singer-songwriter Van Morrison and included as the ending track on his 2008 album, Keep It Simple. Morrison used the song as an encore during concerts promoting the album and continued to include it in his 2008 setlists.

== Composition ==
In the opening lines of the song, the singer is reminiscing of the youthful days in his career as when he fronted the band, Them.

Drinking wine in the alley, drinking wine in the alley
Making time, drinking that wine
Out of my mind in the days gone by

The song's meaning and title are contained in the lines:

Behind the ritual, Behind the ritual
You'll find the spiritual

== Critical reception ==
Reviewer Jeffrey Lee Puckett calls it "one of his trademark long and winding odes" and comments, "He's never messed with us more than he does on 'Behind the Ritual'. At the point when Morrison would normally start improvising a key word or phrase, we get this: blah, blah, blah, blah, blah, blah repeated around 60 times."

In a review in the Buffalo News, Jeff Miers writes: "'Behind the Ritual' stands out as one of Morrison's finest. Over a poised, shuffle groove the singer slurs, intones, dances around the edges of the meaning, his activity serving to shine a light on what is unstated much in the manner that the timeless 'Madame George' said so much with so little."

Another reviewer in The Mirror remarked: "'Behind the Ritual' is the killer. Drinking wine and dancing like a dervish Van finds 'the spiritual behind the ritual.'"

Scott Foundas of LA Weekly writes that "it is not the least of Keep it Simple's accomplishments that it adds one trancelike classic in the making to the Morrison repertoire....it's fittingly the album closer...the song is called "Behind the Ritual" and like many of Morrison's best songs, this one points toward a destination.

Greil Marcus calls the song, "a strong statement of the power of simplicity, and moreover an assertion of Morrison's mastery."

== Personnel ==
- Van Morrison – vocals, alto saxophone, ukulele
- Mick Green – guitar
- John Allair – organ
- Paul Moore – bass
- Neil Wilkinson – drums
- Liam Bradley – percussion
- Crawford Bell – backing vocals
- Karen Hamill – backing vocals
- Jerome Rimson – backing vocals
