= Keep It Simple =

Studio album by Van Morrison
- Released: 17 March 2008
- Genres: Jazz, folk, blues, Celtic, country, soul, gospel
- Length: 50:10
- Labels: Exile Polydor-UK, Lost Highway-U.S.
- Producer: Van Morrison

Van Morrison chronology
Still on Top - The Greatest Hits (2007)	Keep It Simple (2008)	Astral Weeks Live at the Hollywood Bowl (2009)

Keep It Simple is the thirty-third album by Northern Irish singer/songwriter Van Morrison, released in the UK on 17 March 2008 and in the US on 1 April 2008. It was Morrison's first US Top 10 album, and made the Top 10 in the UK, Canada and in some European countries. It was his first studio album of all new original material since Back on Top (1999), and includes elements of jazz, folk, blues, celtic, country, soul and gospel.

== Composition ==
Morrison said that that album has "got elements of blues, folk, gospel - all my influences . . . Curtis Mayfield. It's got a lot of inspiration from various things I was inspired by out there, but it comes out like a new album." Unlike his preceding releases, the album was entirely self-penned, with Morrison saying, "I felt I had something to say with these songs." Morrison said of the track "That's Entrainment", "Entrainment is when you connect with the music. Entrainment is really what I'm getting at in the music. It's kind of when you're in the present moment - you're here - with no past or future."

== Promotion ==
Morrison announced a short United States tour to promote the album with appearances in Austin, Texas; Nashville, Tennessee (at the Ryman Auditorium); Boston, Massachusetts; and in New York City, starting on 11 March. During this tour, he also performed at La Zona Rosa in Austin, Texas, at the South by Southwest (SXSW) music conference and festival on 12 March.

"Entrainment" was played for the first time, at the beginning of the second hour, on Chris Evans BBC Radio 2 Drivetime show on Wednesday, 30 January, with Evans commenting: "The new Van Morrison album came with a shoot-to-kill warning if played before a certain date, but that's now been lifted so we can play it." On 8 March, Morrison gave an interview on BBC Radio 4's Today show, and an hour long interview on the Paul Jones show on BBC Two Radio. On 15 March, Morrison performed all of the songs from the album on concert broadcast on BBC Radio 2.

The album was released on 17 March by Exile Productions Ltd./Polydor in the UK and on the Lost Highway Records label on 1 April in the US. His previous studio album Pay the Devil was also released on the Lost Highway label, in March 2006.

== Reception ==
Professional ratings
Aggregate scores
Source	Rating
Metacritic	69/100
Review scores
Source	Rating
Allmusic	3/5 stars
Entertainment Weekly	(B)
inthenews.co.uk	8/10 stars
The Mirror	5/5 stars
Popmatters	7/10 stars
Rolling Stone	3.5/5 stars
The Star	4/5 stars
Uncut	4/5 stars

On its first week of release the album reached No. 10 on the US charts, which was Morrison's highest placement in the US at that point. His previous highest charting effort was his sixth solo album, Saint Dominic's Preview, which rose to No. 15 in 1972. In 2016, Keep Me Singing would rise to No. 9, his best score to date.

Most critics responded favourably with four star ratings from The Star, The Sun, The Times and Uncut. "There's a certain grace to Van's stripped-back band", one review found, "and as always he evokes images of sorrow and anguish, but with such beauty and warmth that you can't help but smile when you hear them." Rolling Stone notes how "the band settles into a groove while Morrison lifts off into the trancelike realm he calls 'entrainment'." The Guardian praised Morrison's "velvety gargle", and the many "tasteful, blues-by-numbers shuffles", but concluded, "Perhaps a spot more complication for album 34 might help."

== Track listing ==
All songs by Van Morrison

1. "How Can a Poor Boy?" - 5:43
2. "School of Hard Knocks" - 3:44
3. "That's Entrainment" - 4:32
4. "Don't Go to Nightclubs Anymore" - 4:31
5. "Lover Come Back" - 5:15
6. "Keep It Simple" - 3:34
7. "End of the Land" - 3:16
8. "Song of Home" - 4:13
9. "No Thing" - 4:31
10. "Soul" - 3:37
11. "Behind the Ritual" - 6:59

=== iTunes Bonus Track ===
(available UK week of 17 March 2008 and U.S. on 1 April 2008)

1. "Little Village" - 6:11 (Live) (Album Only)

=== Vinyl Bonus Tracks ===
1. "Blue & Green" - 5:52 (Live)
2. "Little Village" - 6:11 (Live)
3. "And The Healing Has Begun" - 7:11 (Live)

Recorded live in concert at the Blackpool Opera House (UK) 26 January 2008

== Personnel ==
- Van Morrison - vocals, piano, alto saxophone, acoustic guitar, ukulele ("That's Entertainment", "Keep It Simple" and "Behind the Ritual")
- John Platania - guitar
- Mick Green - guitar
- Ned Edwards - guitar, harmonica, backing vocals
- Sarah Jory - steel guitar, banjo ("Song of Home" and "Don't go to Nightclubs Anymore")
- Cindy Cashdollar - steel guitar ("No Thing" and "Lover Come Back")
- Paul Moore - bass
- David Hayes - bass ("No Thing", "Lover Come Back" and "End of the Land")
- Geraint Watkins - piano, accordion ("Soul", "Keep It Simple" and "School of Hard Knocks")
- John Allair - organ
- Liam Bradley - percussion
- Tony Fitzgibbon - fiddle ("How Can a Poor Boy?")
- Neal Wilkinson - drums
- Crawford Bell - acoustic guitar, backing vocals
- Katie Kissoon - backing vocals ("Lover Come Back", "End of the Land" and "No Thing")
- Karen Hamill - backing vocals
- Margo Buchanan - backing vocals ("How Can a Poor Boy?", "Don't go to Nightclubs Anymore" and "Song of Home")
- Stevie Lange - backing vocals ("How Can a Poor Boy?", "Don't go to Nightclubs Anymore" and "Song of Home")
- Jerome Rimson - backing vocals ("School of Hard Knocks", "Soul" and "Behind the Ritual")

== Sleeve notes ==
- Mastered by Tim Young at Metropolis Mastering
- Design by Jon Gilbert@Angelfire
- Photograph of Van Morrison by Patrick Baird

== Charts ==
Chart (2008)	Peak position
UK Albums Chart	10
U.S. Billboard 200	10
U.S. Billboard Top Internet Albums	2
Canada Top 100	10
European Top 100 Albums	8
Norway Albums Top 40	7
Swedish Albums Top 60	11
Irish Albums Chart	12
German Albums Top 50	12
Dutch Albums Top 100	12
New Zealand Top 40 Albums	15
Italy Top Album Chart	32
