= BacillaFilla =

BacillaFilla is a genetically engineered strain of the bacterium Bacillus subtilis which was developed by a group of students at Newcastle University in 2010 in order to repair cracks in concrete as part of an International Genetically Engineered Machine competition.

The bacteria would be released as spores which would germinate upon coming into contact with the pH of concrete. Upon germination, the bacteria would descend into cracks in the concrete. The bacteria use quorum sensing to determine when enough bacteria have accumulated, triggering production of a mixture of calcium carbonate and a "bacterial glue", which combines with the bacterial cells to fill the crack. This mixture hardens to be as strong as the surrounding concrete.

Prolonging the life of concrete could reduce CO_{2} emissions derived from concrete production.

== See also ==
- Concrete degradation
