= Carbonatation =

Reaction of calcium hydroxide with CO2 to form calcium carbonate

Carbonatation is a chemical reaction in which calcium hydroxide reacts with carbon dioxide and forms insoluble calcium carbonate:

$$\ce{Ca(OH)2{+}CO2->CaCO3{+}H_2O}$$

The process of forming a carbonate is sometimes referred to as "carbonation", although this term usually refers to the process of dissolving carbon dioxide in water.

== Concrete ==
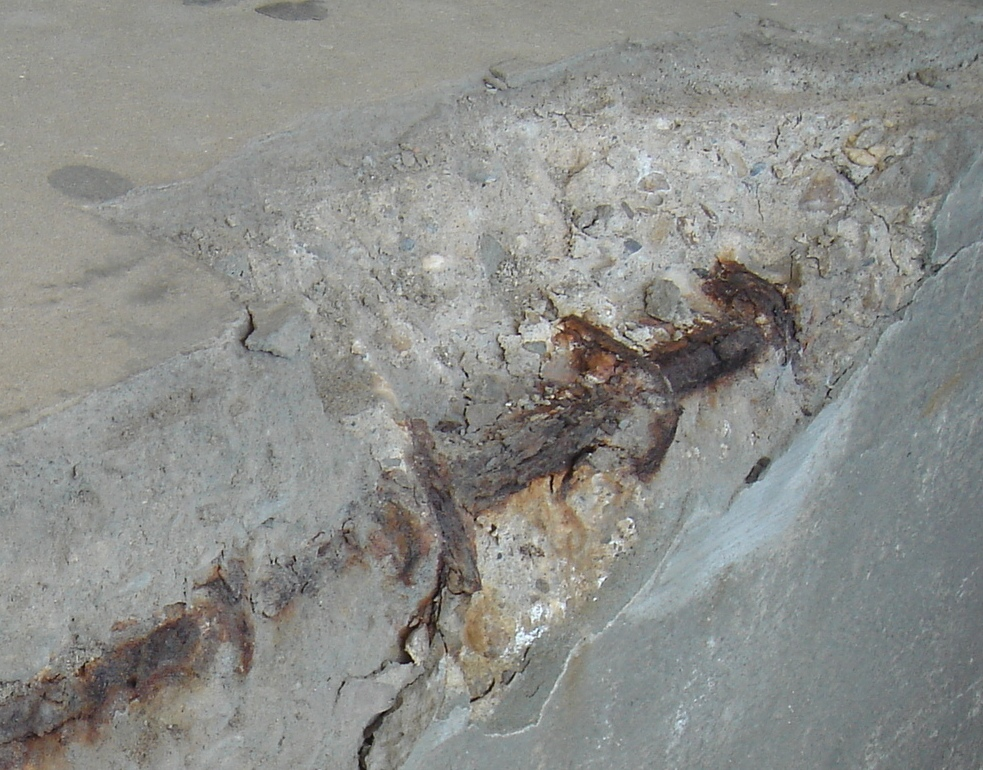
Carbonatation-induced rebar corrosion

Carbonatation is a slow process that occurs in concrete where lime (CaO, or Ca(OH)_{2}_{(aq)}) in the cement reacts with carbon dioxide (CO_{2}) from the air and forms calcium carbonate.

The water in the pores of Portland cement concrete is normally alkaline with a pH in the range of 12.5 to 13.5. This highly alkaline environment is one in which the steel rebar is passivated and is protected from corrosion. According to the Pourbaix diagram for iron, the metal is passive when the pH is above 9.5.

The carbon dioxide in the air reacts with the alkali in the cement and makes the pore water more acidic, thus lowering the pH. Carbon dioxide will start to carbonatate the cement in the concrete from the moment the object is made. This carbonatation process will start at the surface, then slowly moves deeper and deeper into the concrete. The rate of carbonatation is dependent on the relative humidity of the concrete - a 50% relative humidity being optimal. If the object is cracked, the carbon dioxide in the air will be better able to penetrate into the concrete.

Eventually this may lead to corrosion of the rebar and structural damage or failure.

== Sugar refining ==
The carbonatation process is used in the production of sugar from sugar beets. It involves the introduction of limewater (milk of lime - calcium hydroxide suspension) and carbon dioxide enriched gas into the "raw juice" (the sugar rich liquid prepared from the diffusion stage of the process) to form calcium carbonate and precipitate impurities that are then removed. The whole process takes place in "carbonatation tanks" and processing time varies from 20 minutes to an hour.

Carbonatation involves the following effects:

- The increase in alkalinity coagulates proteins in the juice.
- Calcium carbonate absorbs colourants
- Alkalinity destroys some monosaccharide sugars, mostly glucose and fructose

The target is a large particle that naturally settles rapidly to leave a clear juice. The juice at the end is approximately 15 °Bx and 90% sucrose. The pH of the thin juice produced is a balance between removing as much calcium from the solution and the expected pH drop across later processing. If the juice goes acidic in the crystallisation stages then sucrose rapidly breaks down to glucose and fructose; not only do glucose and fructose affect crystallisation but they are 'molassagenic' taking equivalent amounts of sucrose on to the molasses stage.

The carbon dioxide gas bubbled through the mixture forms calcium carbonate. The non-sugar solids are incorporated into the calcium carbonate particles and removed by natural (or assisted) sedimentation in tanks or clarifiers.

There are several systems of carbonatation, named from the companies that first developed them. They differ in how the lime is introduced, the temperature and duration of each stage, and the separation of the solids from the liquid.

- Dorr (also Dorr-Oliver) - a continuous process using two tanks with recycling ("1st carbonatation") to build up particle size for natural flocculation. The recycling ratio is about 7:1. The particles are separated under gravity in a thickening stage in a clarifier. The clear juice is then gassed further in another tank ("2nd carbonatation") and filtered. The concentrated mud (underflow) from the clarifier is filtered and/or pressed to recover more liquid. The Dorr process is low in maintenance and man-power but susceptible to filtration problems when frost damaged beets are processed. It is favoured in the UK and the USA.
- DDS (Det Danske Sukkerfabrik - "The Danish Sugarfactory") -- multistage process involving pre-liming where the pH of the juice is gradually increased to start precipitation of proteins, followed by addition of further lime and CO_{2} gas. The particles are removed at each stage by filtration.
- RT (Raffinerie Tirlemontoise - "Sugar refinery of Tienen") - another multistage process with a pre-liming stage. Particles also removed by filtration.

Both DDS and RT processes are favoured by European factories. The carbonatation system is generally matched to the diffusion scheme; juice from RT diffusers being processed by the RT carbonatation.

The clear juice from carbonatation is generally known as "thin juice". it may undergo pH adjustment with soda ash and addition of sulfur ("sulfitation") prior to the next stage which is concentration by multiple effect evaporation.

== Water softening ==
The carbonatation reaction takes place during lime softening (Clark's process) in water softening.

== See also ==
- Alkali–silica reaction
- Concrete degradation
- Phosphatation — a similar process used in sugarcane processing.
