= Sulfate attack in concrete and mortar =

Concrete degradation mainly caused by ettringite crystallization

Sulfate attack typically happens to ground floor slabs in contact with soils containing a source of sulfates. Sulfates dissolved by ground moisture migrate into the concrete of the slab where they react with different mineral phases of the hardened cement paste.

The attack arises from soils containing SO^{2−}_{4} ions, such as MgSO_{4} or Na_{2}SO_{4} soluble and hygroscopic salts. The tricalcium aluminate (C_{3}A) hydrates first interact with sulfate ions to form ettringite (AFt). Ettringite crystallizes into small acicular needles slowly growing in the concrete pores. Once the pores are completely filled, ettringite can develop a high crystallization pressure inside the pores, exerting a considerable tensile stress in the concrete matrix causing the formation of cracks. Ultimately, Ca^{2+} ions in equilibrium with portlandite (Ca(OH)_{2}) and C-S-H and dissolved in the concrete interstitial water can also react with SO^{2−}_{4} ions to precipitate CaSO_{4}·2H_{2}O (gypsum). A fraction of SO^{2−}_{4} ions can also be trapped, or sorbed, into the layered structure of C-S-H. These successive reactions lead to the precipitation of expansive mineral phases inside the concrete porosity responsible for the concrete degradation, cracks and ultimately the failure of the structure.

== Background: the key mineral phases ==
Cement hydration and strength development mainly depend on two silicate phases: tricalcium silicate (C_{3}S) (alite), and dicalcium silicate (C_{2}S) (belite). Upon hydration, the main reaction products are calcium silicate hydrates (C-S-H) and calcium hydroxide Ca(OH)_{2}, written as CH in the cement chemist notation. C-S-H is the phase playing the role of the glue in the cement hardened paste and responsible of its cohesion. Cement also contains two aluminate phases: C_{3}A and C_{4}AF, respectively the tricalcium aluminate and the tetracalcium aluminoferrite. C_{3}A hydration products are AFm, calcium aluminoferrite monosulfate, and ettringite, a calcium aluminoferrite trisulfate (AFt). C_{4}AF hydrates as hydrogarnet and ferrous ettringite.

== External attack ==
This is the more common type of sulfate attack, and typically occurs where groundwater containing dissolved sulfate are in contact with concrete. Sulfate ions diffusing into concrete react with portlandite (CH) to form gypsum:

ŜH + CH → CSH_{2} (cement chemist notation)
C_{3}A + 3 CŜH_{2} + 26 H → C_{3}A·3CŜ·H_{32}
tricalcium aluminate + gypsum + water → ettringite

When the concentration of sulfate ions decreases, ettringite breaks down into monosulfate aluminates (AFm):

2 C_{3}A + C_{3}A·3CŜ·H_{32} → 3 C_{3}A·3CŜ·H_{12}
tricalcium aluminate + ettringite → mono-sulfate aluminates (AFm)

When it reacts with concrete, it causes the slab to expand, lifting, distorting and cracking as well as exerting a pressure onto the surrounding walls which can cause movements significantly weakening the structure.

Some infill materials frequently encountered in building fondations and causing sulfate attack are the following:

- Red Ash (shale)
- Black ash
- Slag
- Grey fly ash
- Other industrial materials and building rubble can also cause problems.

These materials were used extensively in the North West of England as they were widely available and waste products from industries such as coal mines, steelworks, foundries and power stations.

== Excess of gypsum in concrete ==
If gypsum is present in excess in concrete, it reacts with the monosulfate aluminates to form ettringite:

C_{3}A·3CŜ·H_{12} + 2 CSH_{2} + 16 H → C_{3}A·3CŜ·H_{32}

A fairly well-defined reaction front can often be observed in thin sections; ahead of the front the concrete is normal, or near normal. Behind the reaction front, the composition and the microstructure of concrete are modified. These changes may vary in type or severity but commonly include:

- Extensive cracking
- Expansion
- Loss of bond between the cement paste and aggregate
- Alteration of hardened cement paste composition, with monosulfate aluminates phase converting to ettringite and, in later stages, gypsum formation. The necessary additional calcium is provided by the calcium hydroxide and calcium silicate hydrate in the cement paste

The effect of these changes is an overall loss of concrete strength.

The above effects are typical of attack by solutions of sodium sulfate or potassium sulfate. Solutions containing magnesium sulfate are generally more aggressive, for the same concentration. This is because magnesium also takes part in the reactions, replacing calcium in the solid phases with the formation of brucite (magnesium hydroxide) and magnesium silicate hydrates. The displaced calcium precipitates mainly as gypsum.

== Sources of sulfates ==
- Oxidation of pyrite in clay formations in contact with concrete – this produces sulfuric acid which reacts with concrete.
- Bacterial activity in sewers – anaerobic sulfate reduction at work in the organic-rich sludges accumulated under water in the conduits produces hydrogen sulfide gas (H_{2}S). After its released in the air of the galleries, H_{2}S is further oxidized into sulfuric acid by atmospheric oxygen.
- In masonry, sulfates produced by the oxidation of pyrite in clay materials can be present in bricks. They are gradually released over a long period of time, causing sulfate attack of mortar, especially where moisture movement concentrates the sulfates.
- Seawater: sulfate is the second anion present in seawater after chloride.

== Identification ==
Sulfate attacks are identified through a remedial survey but they can often be overlooked when undertaking a damp survey as they can be considered as a structural rather than a dampness issue but moisture is required to promote the reaction.

A first visual and leveling inspection of the structure and the underlying terrain is a first step to recognize a sulfate issue. To characterize the type and depth of the infill, exploration holes are needed.

If water is present in the subfloor of the structure, a structural engineer may need to be instructed, subject to the level of damage or movement to the walls.

== Remedial action ==
The remedial action depends on the severity of the attack and on the risk related to its evolution.

If repairs are required because of the extent of damages, often, the affected slab must be demolished and removed, the spoil should not be used as hardcore under the replacement slab.

== See also ==
- Concrete degradation
- Pitting corrosion (effect of sulfur and sulfides)
