= Carbonation =

Reactions of carbon dioxide, including process of dissolving carbon dioxide in a liquid

Carbonation is the chemical reaction of carbon dioxide to give carbonates, bicarbonates, and carbonic acid. In chemistry, the term is sometimes used in place of carboxylation, which refers to the formation of carboxylic acids.

In inorganic chemistry and geology, carbonation is common. Metal hydroxides (MOH) and metal oxides (M'O) react with CO_{2} to give bicarbonates and carbonates:

MOH + CO_{2} → M(HCO_{3})
M'O + CO_{2} → M'CO_{3}

== Selected carbonations ==
=== Carbonic anhydrase ===
In mammalian physiology, transport of carbon dioxide to the lungs involves a carbonation reaction catalyzed by the enzyme carbonic anhydrase. In the absence of such catalysts, carbon dioxide cannot be expelled sufficient rate to support metabolic needs. The enzyme harbors a zinc aquo complex, which captures carbon dioxide to give a zinc bicarbonate:

[(imidazole)_{3}ZnOH]^{+} + CO_{2} ⇌ [(imidazole)_{3}ZnOCO_{2}H]^{+}

=== Behavior of concrete ===
In reinforced concrete, the chemical reaction between carbon dioxide in the air and calcium hydroxide and hydrated calcium silicate in the concrete is known as neutralisation. The similar reaction in which calcium hydroxide from cement reacts with carbon dioxide and forms insoluble calcium carbonate is carbonatation.

=== Urea production ===
Carbonation of ammonia is one step in the industrial production of urea. In 2020, worldwide production capacity was approximately 180 million tonnes. As a fertilizer, it is a source of nitrogen for plants. Urea production plants are almost always located adjacent to the site where the ammonia is manufactured.

2 NH_{3} + CO_{2} ⇌ [NH_{4}]^{+}[NH_{2}COO]^{−}

In the subsequent urea conversion: the ammonium carbamate is decomposed into urea, releasing water:

[NH_{4}]^{+}[NH_{2}COO]^{−} ⇌ CO(NH_{2})_{2} + H_{2}O

=== Solubility ===
Henry's law states that P_{CO_{2}}=K_{B}x_{CO_{2}} where P_{CO_{2}} is the partial pressure of CO_{2} gas above the solution. K_{B} is Henry's law constant. K_{B} increases as temperature increases. x_{CO_{2}} is the mole fraction of CO_{2} gas in the solution. According to Henry's law carbonation increases in a solution as temperature decreases.

Since carbonation is the process of giving compounds like carbonic acid (liq) from CO_{2} (gas) {i.e. making liquid from gasses} thus the partial pressure of CO_{2} has to decrease or the mole fraction of CO_{2} in solution has to increase {P_{CO_{2}}/x_{CO_{2}} = K_{B}} and both these two conditions support increase in carbonation.
