= That's Entrainment =

Song by Van Morrison

from the album Keep It Simple
- Released: March 17, 2008 (UK); April 1, 2008 (US)
- Length: 4:31
- Label: Exile/Polydor; Exile/Lost Highway
- Songwriter(s): Van Morrison
- Producer(s): Van Morrison

"That's Entrainment" is a song written by Northern Irish singer-songwriter Van Morrison and included on his 2008 album, Keep It Simple.

Morrison described the meaning of the word "entrainment" and the music on the album thus:

Entrainment is when you connect with the music...Entrainment is really what I'm getting at in the music...It's kind of when you're in the present moment - you're here - with no past or future.

"That's Entrainment" was played for the first time, at the beginning of the second hour, on Chris Evans BBC 2 Drivetime show on Wednesday, January 30, 2008, with Evans commenting "The new Van Morrison album came with a shoot to kill warning if played before a certain date, but that's now been lifted so we can play it."

== Personnel on original release ==
- Van Morrison - vocals, ukulele
- Mick Green - guitar
- Paul Moore - bass
- Neil Wilkinson - drums
