= Air entrainment =

Voluntary trapping of tiny air bubbles in concrete

Air entrainment in concrete is the intentional creation of tiny air bubbles in a batch by adding an air-entraining agent during mixing. A form of surfactant allows bubbles of a desired size to form. These are created during concrete mixing (while the slurry is in its liquid state), with most surviving to remain part of it when hardened.

Air entrainment makes concrete more workable during placement, and increases its durability when hardened, particularly in climates subject to freeze-thaw cycles.

Air-entrained concrete exists in contrast to the foam concrete, which is made by introducing stable air bubbles through the use of a foam agent. Foam concrete has lower density and is commonly used for insulation or filling voids; air-entrained concrete, on the other hand, has evenly distributed tiny air voids introduced through admixtures to enhance durability, workability, and resistance to freeze-thaw cycles without significantly reducing its overall density, and without negative impact on its mechanical properties, allowing its use in objects such as bridges and roads built using roller-compacted concrete. Another difference is the manufacturing process: foam concrete involves the creation of a foam mixture separately, which is then mixed with cement, sand, and water to form the final product, while air-entrained concrete is produced by adding specialized admixtures or additives directly into the concrete mix during mixing to create small air bubbles throughout the mixture.

Approximately 85% of concrete manufacturing in the United States contains air-entraining agents, which are considered the fifth ingredient in concrete-manufacturing technology.

== Benefits ==
Air entrainment is beneficial for the properties of both fresh and hardened concrete. In fresh concrete, air entrainment improves workability and makes it easier to handle and pump. It also helps prevent bleeding and segregation, unwanted processes that can occur during mixing. In hardened concrete, air entrainment strengthens the material by making it better able to withstand freeze-thaw cycles. It also increases its resistance to cracking, improves durability against fire damage, and enhances overall strength. Therefore, adding air to concrete when it is being made makes it easier to handle at first, but then later helps it stay strong even under tough conditions like freezing temperatures or fire exposure.

Tiny air bubbles in air-entrained concrete act as internal cushioning, absorbing energy during impacts and increasing resistance to physical forces such as shock or vibration. This improved impact resistance helps minimize surface damage and prevent the propagation of cracks or breaks, thereby increasing overall durability. Additionally, the air voids, acting as pressure-relief zones, allow water or moisture expansion during freeze-thaw cycles without causing internal stresses and subsequent cracking.

== Process ==
Though hardened concrete appears as a compact solid, it is actually highly porous (typical concrete porosity is about 6–12 vol.%), having small capillaries resulting from the evaporation of water beyond that required for the hydration reaction. A water-to-cement ratio (w/c) of approximately 0.38 (this means 38 lbs. of water for every 100 lbs. of cement) is required for all the cement particles to hydrate. Water beyond that is surplus and is used to make the plastic concrete more workable or less viscous. To achieve a suitable slump to be workable, most concrete has a w/c of 0.45–0.60 at the time of placement, which means that there is substantial excess water that will not react with cement. When the excess water evaporates, it leaves little pores in its place. Environmental water can later fill these voids through capillary action. During freeze-thaw cycles, the water occupying those pores expands and creates tensile stresses, which lead to tiny cracks. These cracks allow more water into the concrete, and the cracks enlarge. Eventually the concrete spalls – chunks break off. The failure of reinforced concrete is most often due to this cycle, which is accelerated by moisture reaching the reinforcing steel, causing it to rust, expand, create more cracks, let in more water, and aggravate the decomposition cycle.

Air entrainment is a process that should be tightly controlled to avoid naturally occurring entrainment, which means the unintentional or undesirable presence of air voids in concrete, caused by factors such as improper mixing or insufficient consolidation, which may lead to reduced strength and durability due to inconsistent sizes and placement of air voids, making it less desirable for achieving specific concrete performance properties.

Various materials can impact the properties of air-entraining admixture in several ways.

Fly ash, a supplementary cementitious material, improves paste packing due to its smaller particles, resulting in better flow and finishing of the concrete. Fly ash's lower specific gravity increases the paste content for a given water-to-cementitious-material ratio (w/cm) compared to ordinary Portland cement. Different types of fly ash require adjustments in air-entraining admixture dosage due to variations in their chemical compositions and air-loss characteristics. Class F fly ash typically demands higher levels of admixture to maintain desired entrained air levels compared to Class C fly ash.

Silica fume is another material that influences air-entrained concrete. Its fine particle size and smoothness necessitate higher dosages of air-entraining admixture than traditional concretes without silica fume.

Slag cement contributes improved packing and increased paste volume fraction due to its lower specific gravity than ordinary Portland cement.

Including natural pozzolans like rice husk ash or metakaolin affects fineness and composition, which further influence the required dosage of air-entraining admixtures in mixed concretes containing these materials.

== Size ==
The air bubbles typically have a diameter of 10 to 500 micrometres (0.0004 to 0.02 in) and are closely spaced. The voids they create can be compressed a little, acting to reduce or absorb stresses from freezing.

== Entrapped air ==
In addition to intentionally entrained air, hardened concrete also typically contains some amount of entrapped air. These are larger bubbles, creating larger voids, known as "honeycombing", and generally are less evenly distributed than entrained air. Proper concrete placement, which often includes vibration to settle it into place and drive out entrapped air, particularly in wall forms, is essential to minimizing deleterious entrapped air.

== Interference of carbon-containing fly ash ==
Using fly ash, a byproduct of coal combustion, as an additive in concrete production is a common practice due to its environmental and cost benefits. Still, residual carbon in fly ash can interfere with air-entraining admixtures (AEAs). This issue has become more pronounced with the implementation of low-NO_{x} combustion technologies. There are mechanisms behind the interactions between AEAs and fly ash in concrete mixtures, related to the effects of residual carbon. The amount of carbon and its properties, such as particle size and surface chemistry, impact the adsorption capacity of AEAs. The type of fuel used during combustion affects both the amount and properties of residual carbon present. Fly ash derived from bituminous coal generally has higher carbon content than those produced from sub-bituminous coal or lignite but exhibits lower AEA adsorption capacity per mass of carbon. Different post-treatment methods are used to improve fly ash quality for concrete utilization. Techniques such as ozonation, thermal treatment, and physical cleaning have shown promise in enhancing performance.

== History ==
Air entraining was introduced in the 1930s, and most modern concrete, especially if subjected to freezing temperatures, is air-entrained. The bubbles contribute to workability by acting as a sort of lubricant for all the aggregates and large sand particles in a concrete mix.

Air entrainment was discovered by accident in the mid-1930s. At that time, cement manufacturers were using a grinding aid to enhance the process of grinding cement. This grinding aid was a mixture of various chemicals, including salts of wood resin, which were added to the cement during the grinding process. During the experiments, researchers noticed that adding this grinding aid caused the resulting concrete to exhibit specific unique properties. Specifically, they observed that the concrete contained tiny, dispersed air bubbles throughout its structure, significantly improving its durability and resistance to freezing and thawing. Further investigations and research were conducted to understand this phenomenon, leading to the realization that the grinding aid was responsible for entraining air into the concrete. This accidental discovery eventually led to intentional air entrainment becoming a standard practice in concrete production. Since then, air-entrained concrete has become a standard practice rather than an exception, especially in cold climates.

Air-entraining agents (AEAs) have been developed and extensively studied to improve resistance against freezing and thawing damage caused by both internal distress and salt scaling.

== Superabsorbent polymers as an alternative ==
Superabsorbent polymers (SAPs) have the potential to replace traditional air-entraining agents (AEAs) in concrete, as they can create stable pore systems that function similarly to air voids introduced by AEAs. SAP particles absorb water during mixing and form stable, water-filled inclusions in fresh concrete. As cement hydrates and undergoes chemical shrinkage, the pores of the hardening cement paste empty out their water content. The SAP particles then release their absorbed water to compensate for this shrinkage, effectively mitigating autogenous shrinkage and reducing the risk of cracking. These pores created by SAP act as voids similar to those generated by AEAs, improving freeze-thaw resistance and durability. Unlike AEAs, which may lose a portion of entrained air due to factors like long hauling durations or high ambient temperatures, the SAP pore system remains stable regardless of consistency, superplasticizer addition, or placement method. SAP is a reliable alternative for achieving controlled air entrainment in concrete construction. By using SAPs instead of traditional AEAs, construction practitioners can enhance freeze-thaw resistance without worrying about losing a significant portion of entrained air bubbles during mixing or placement processes.
