= Concrete =

Composite construction material

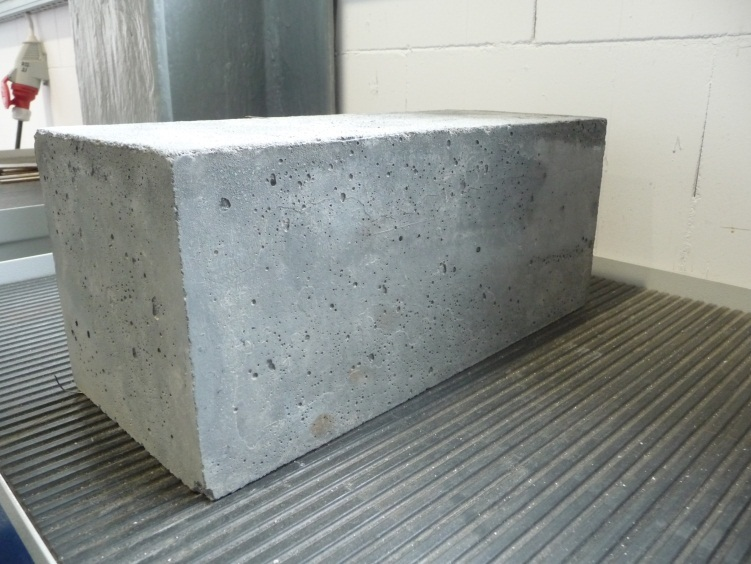
A single concrete block, as used for construction

Concrete is a composite material composed of aggregate bound together with a fluid cement that cures to a solid. It is the second-most-used substance (after water), the most widely used building material, and the most-manufactured material in the world. Cement-bound concrete differs from the less rigid, less durable asphaltic concrete, which has a bituminous binder.

When aggregate is mixed with dry Portland cement and water, the mixture forms a fluid slurry that can be poured and molded into shape. The cement reacts with the water through a process called hydration, which hardens it after several hours to form a solid matrix that binds the materials together into a durable stone-like material with various uses. This time allows concrete to not only be cast in forms, but also to have a variety of tooled processes performed. The hydration process is exothermic, which means that ambient temperature plays a significant role in how long it takes concrete to set. Often, additives (such as pozzolans or superplasticizers) are included in the mixture to improve the physical properties of the wet mix, delay or accelerate the curing time, or otherwise modify the finished material. Most structural concrete is poured with reinforcing materials (such as steel rebar) embedded to provide tensile strength, yielding reinforced concrete.

Before the invention of Portland cement in the early 1800s, lime-based cement binders, such as lime putty, were often used. The overwhelming majority of concretes are produced using Portland cement, but sometimes with other hydraulic cements, such as calcium aluminate cement. Many other non-cementitious types of concrete exist with other methods of binding aggregate together, including asphalt concrete with a bitumen binder, which is frequently used for road surfaces, and polymer concretes that use polymers as a binder.

Concrete is distinct from mortar. Whereas concrete is itself a building material, and contains both coarse (large) and fine (small) aggregate particles, mortar contains only fine aggregates and is mainly used as a bonding agent to hold bricks, tiles and other masonry units together. Grout is another material associated with concrete and cement. It also does not contain coarse aggregates and is usually either pourable or thixotropic, and is used to fill gaps between masonry components or coarse aggregate which has already been put in place. Some methods of concrete manufacture and repair involve pumping grout into the gaps to make up a solid mass in situ.

== Etymology ==
The word concrete comes from the Latin word "concretus" (meaning compact or condensed), the perfect passive participle of "concrescere", from "con-" (together) and "crescere" (to grow).

== History ==
=== Ancient times ===
Concrete floors were found in the royal palace of Tiryns, Greece, which dates roughly to 1400 to 1200 BC. Lime mortars were used in Greece, such as in Crete and Cyprus, in 800 BC. The Assyrian Jerwan Aqueduct (688 BC) made use of waterproof concrete. Concrete was used for construction in many ancient structures.

Small-scale production of concrete-like materials was pioneered by the Nabatean traders who occupied and controlled a series of oases and developed a small empire in the regions of southern Syria and northern Jordan from the 4th century BC. They discovered the advantages of hydraulic lime, with some self-cementing properties, by 700 BC. They built kilns to supply mortar for the construction of rubble masonry houses, concrete floors, and underground waterproof cisterns. They kept the cisterns secret as these enabled the Nabataeans to thrive in the desert. Some of these structures survive to this day.

=== Classical era ===
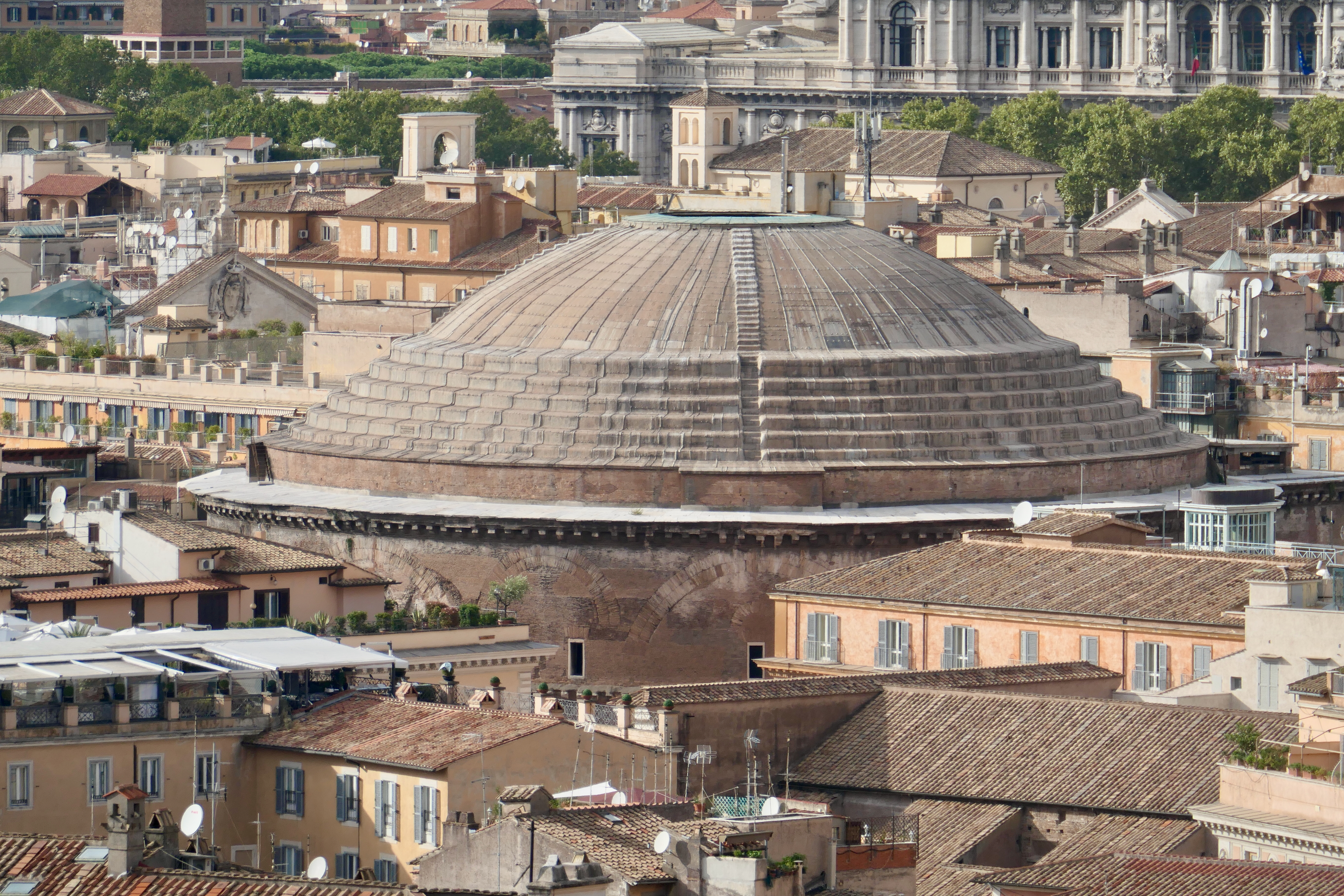
Exterior of the Roman Pantheon, finished 128 AD, the largest unreinforced concrete dome in the world.

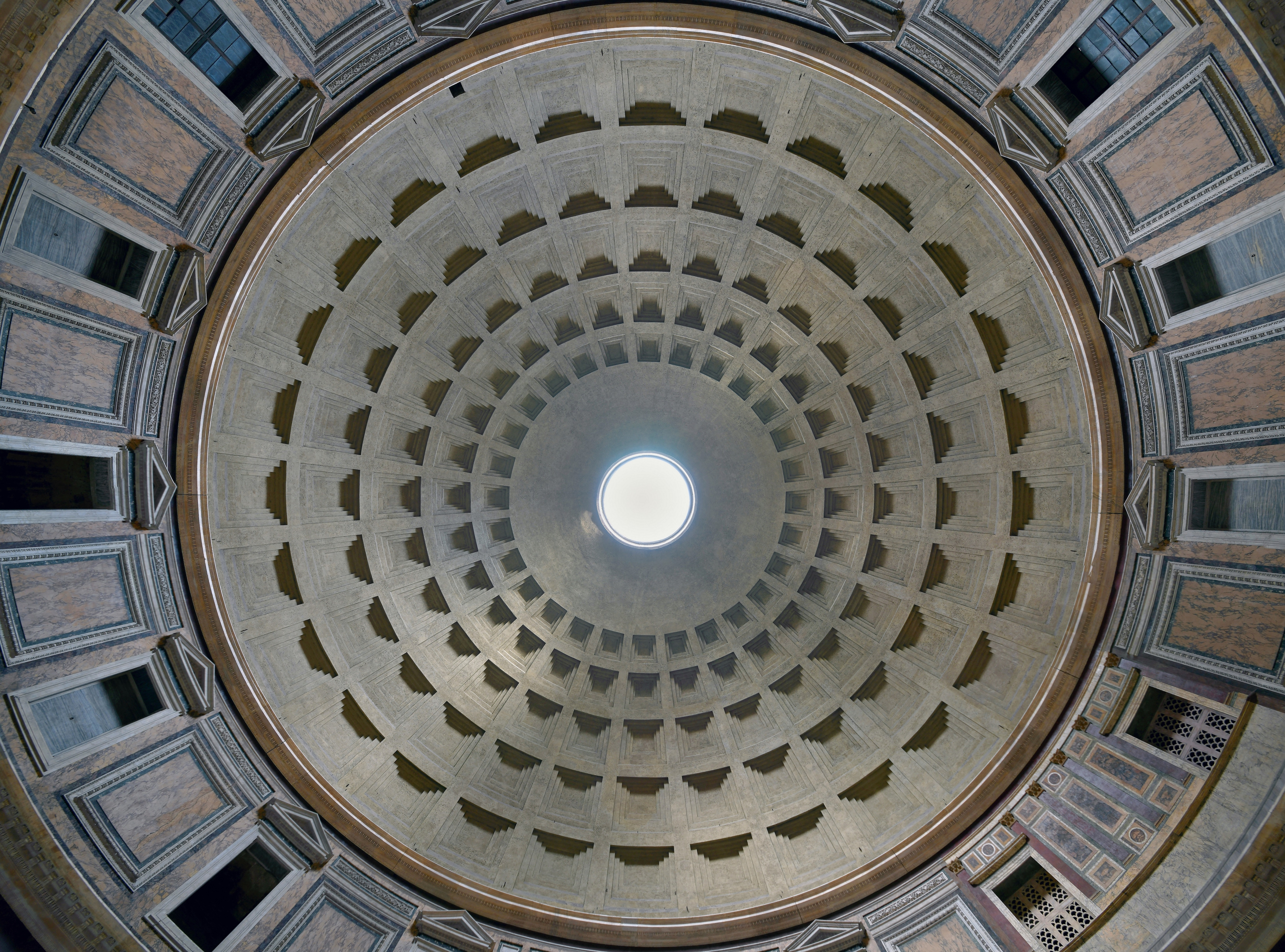
Interior of the Pantheon dome, seen from beneath. The concrete for the coffered dome was laid on moulds, mounted on temporary scaffolding.

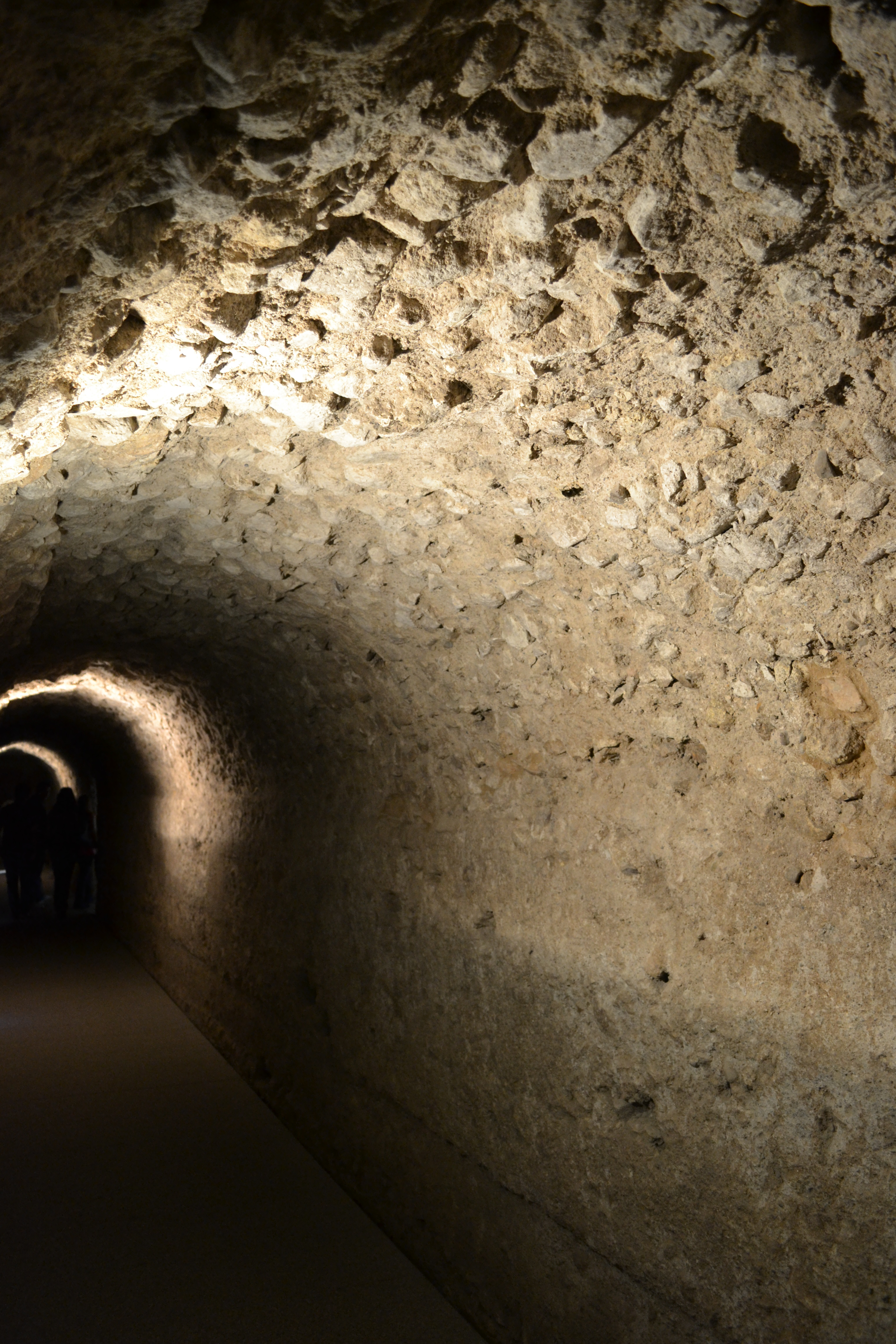
Opus caementicium exposed in a characteristic Roman arch. In contrast to modern concrete structures, the concrete used in Roman buildings was usually covered with brick or stone.

The Romans used concrete extensively from 300 BC to AD 476. During the Roman Empire, Roman concrete (or opus caementicium) was made from quicklime, pozzolana, and an aggregate of pumice. Its widespread use in many Roman structures, a key event in the history of architecture termed the Roman architectural revolution, freed Roman construction from the restrictions of stone and brick materials. It enabled revolutionary new designs in terms of both structural complexity and dimension. The Colosseum in Rome was built largely of concrete. The Pantheon has the world's largest unreinforced concrete dome.

Concrete, as the Romans knew it, was a new and revolutionary material. Laid in the shape of arches, vaults, and domes, it quickly hardened into a rigid mass, free from many of the internal thrusts and strains that troubled the builders of similar structures in stone or brick.

Modern tests show that opus caementicium had a similar compressive strength to modern Portland-cement concrete (c. 200 kg/cm^{2} [20 MPa; 2,800 psi]), however, due to the absence of reinforcement, its tensile strength was far lower than modern reinforced concrete, and its mode of application also differed:

Modern structural concrete differs from Roman concrete in two important details. First, its mix consistency is fluid and homogeneous, allowing it to be poured into forms rather than requiring hand-layering together with the placement of aggregate, which, in Roman practice, often consisted of rubble. Second, integral reinforcing steel gives modern concrete assemblies great strength in tension, whereas Roman concrete could depend only upon the strength of the concrete bonding to resist tension.

The long-term durability of Roman concrete structures was found to be due to the presence of pyroclastic (volcanic) rock and ash in the concrete mix. The crystallization of strätlingite (a complex calcium aluminosilicate hydrate) during the formation of the concrete and its merging with similar calcium–aluminium-silicate–hydrate structures helped give the Roman concrete a greater degree of fracture resistance compared to modern concrete, sometimes discussed as having being self-healing qualities. In addition, Roman concrete is significantly more resistant to erosion by seawater than modern concrete; the aforementioned pyroclastic materials react with seawater to form Al-tobermorite crystals over time.

The use of hot mixing in preparation of concrete, leading to the formation of lime clasts in the final product, has been proposed as the technique giving the Roman concrete a self-healing ability.

The widespread use of their concrete in many Roman structures ensured that many survive to the present day. The Baths of Caracalla in Rome are just one example. Many Roman aqueducts and bridges have masonry cladding on a concrete core, as does the dome of the Pantheon.

=== Middle Ages ===
In Britannia after the Roman Empire, there is evidence of the continued use of burned lime and remains of an 8th century mortar mill have been found in Northamptonshire. It is thought that low kiln temperatures in the burning of lime, lack of pozzolana, poor mixing, and an Anglo-Saxon culture of timber construction all contributed to a decline in the quality of concrete and mortar there, but it did not become a lost art. From the 11th century in England, the increased use of stone in church and castle construction led to an increased demand for mortar. Quality began to improve in the 12th century through better grinding and sieving. Medieval lime mortars and concretes were non-hydraulic and were used for binding masonry, "hearting" (binding rubble masonry cores) and foundations. Bartholomaeus Anglicus in his De proprietatibus rerum (1240) describes the making of mortar. In an English translation from 1397, it reads "lyme ... is a stone brent; by medlynge thereof with sonde and water sement is made". From the 14th century, the quality of mortar was again excellent, but only from the 17th century was pozzolana commonly added.

Mayan concrete at the ruins of Uxmal (AD 850–925) is referenced in Incidents of Travel in the Yucatán by John L. Stephens. "The roof is flat and had been covered with cement". "The floors were cement, in some places hard, but, by long exposure, broken, and now crumbling under the feet." "But throughout the wall was solid, and consisting of large stones imbedded in mortar, almost as hard as rock."

Medieval hydraulic mortars were made from the addition of pozzolans such as crushed ceramics, volcanic soils, or metamorphosed soils from specific deposits with known pozzolanic properties, like Trass or noncrystalline opal. Hydraulic mortar was used in medieval Crete. The use of specific sands containing volcanic ash in 10th-11th century south-Italian mortars may indicate a knowledge of its properties.

The Roman architectural treatise De architectura by Vitruvius contained a description of Roman cement and a copy at the scriptorium of Charlemagne produced many of the medieval copies that subsequently survived. A copy at Saint Gall Abbey was found by Poggio Bracciolini in 1414. The first printed edition was published in 1486 by Fra Giovanni Sulpitius and versions in Italian, German, French, Spanish, and English were published between 1520 and 1692.

=== Early modern period ===
A 16th-century dockyard in Venice used hydraulic lime mortars in foundations. Hydraulic mortar was also used in Ottoman baths in Budapest from the same period.

The Canal du Midi was built using concrete in 1670.

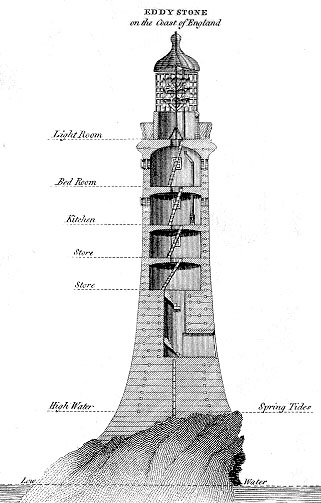
Smeaton's Tower in Devon, England

Trass from the Rhineland was added to lime in England in the 17th century, including for the mole of English Tangier (1663-1683), which also used Italian pozzolana recommended and supplied by Genoese engineers. At the port of Toulon, concrete foundations were built using pozzolana or trass, quicklime, sand, pebbles, and slag or cinder. The 1752 reconstruction of the foundations of Essex bridge by George Semple included a mixture of small stones, sand, and powdered lime.

Perhaps the greatest step forward in the modern use of concrete was Smeaton's Tower, built by British engineer John Smeaton in Devon, England, between 1756 and 1759. This third Eddystone Lighthouse pioneered the use of hydraulic lime in concrete, using pebbles and powdered brick as aggregate.

=== Modern period ===
A method for producing Portland cement was developed in England and patented by Joseph Aspdin in 1824. Aspdin chose the name for its similarity to Portland stone, which was quarried on the Isle of Portland in Dorset, England. His son William continued developments into the 1840s, earning him recognition for the development of "modern" Portland cement.

Reinforced concrete was invented in 1849 by Joseph Monier. and the first reinforced concrete house was built by François Coignet in 1853. The first concrete reinforced bridge was designed and built by Joseph Monier in 1875.

Prestressed concrete and post-tensioned concrete were pioneered by Eugène Freyssinet, a French structural and civil engineer. Concrete components or structures are compressed by tendon cables during, or after, their fabrication in order to strengthen them against tensile forces developing when put in service. Freyssinet patented the technique on 2 October 1928.

== Composition ==
Concrete is an artificial composite material, comprising a matrix of cementitious binder (typically Portland cement paste or asphalt) and a dispersed phase or "filler" of aggregate (typically a rocky material, loose stones, and sand). The binder "glues" the filler together to form a synthetic conglomerate. Many types of concrete are available, determined by the formulations of binders and the types of aggregate used to suit the application of the engineered material. These variables determine strength and density, as well as chemical and thermal resistance of the finished product.

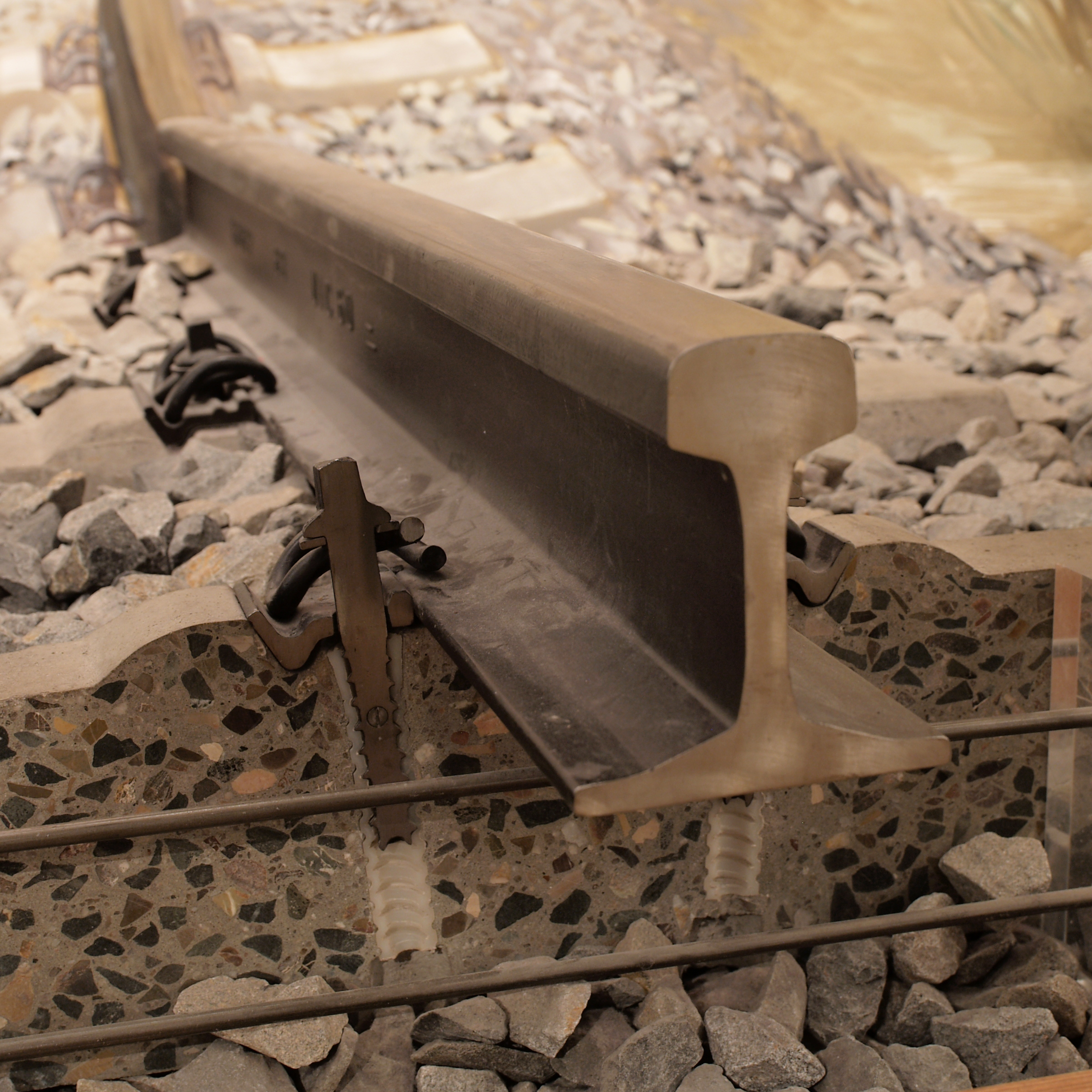
Cross section of a concrete railway sleeper below a rail

Construction aggregates consist of large chunks of material in a concrete mix, generally a coarse gravel or crushed rocks such as limestone, or granite, along with finer materials such as sand.

Cement paste, most commonly made of Portland cement, is the most prevalent kind of concrete binder. For cementitious binders, water is mixed with the dry cement powder and aggregate, which produces a semi-liquid slurry (paste) that can be shaped, typically by pouring it into a form. The concrete solidifies and hardens through a chemical process called hydration. The water reacts with the cement, which bonds the other components together, creating a robust, stone-like material. Other cementitious materials, such as fly ash and slag cement, are sometimes added—either pre-blended with the cement or directly as a concrete component—and become a part of the binder for the aggregate. Fly ash and slag can enhance some properties of concrete such as fresh properties and durability. Alternatively, other materials can also be used as a concrete binder: the most prevalent substitute is asphalt, which is used as the binder in asphalt concrete.

Admixtures are added to modify the cure rate or properties of the material. Mineral admixtures use recycled materials as concrete ingredients. Conspicuous materials include fly ash, a by-product of coal-fired power plants; ground granulated blast furnace slag, a by-product of steelmaking; and silica fume, a by-product of industrial electric arc furnaces.

Structures employing Portland cement concrete usually include steel reinforcement because this type of concrete can be formulated with high compressive strength, but always has lower tensile strength. Therefore, it is usually reinforced with materials that are strong in tension, typically steel rebar.

The mix design depends on the type of structure being built, how the concrete is mixed and delivered, and how it is placed to form the structure.

=== Cement ===
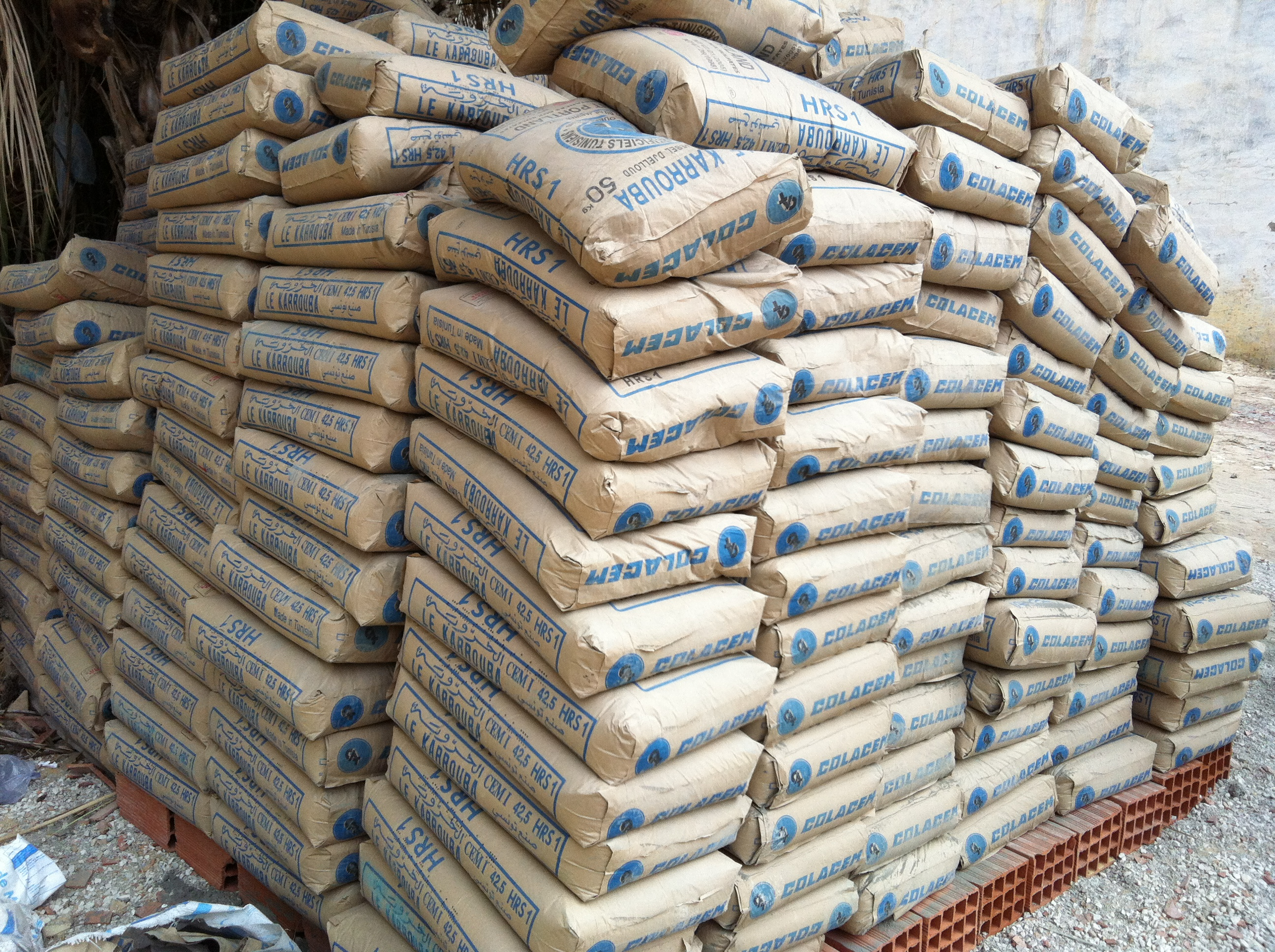
Several tons of bagged cement, about two minutes of output from a 10,000 ton per day cement kiln

Portland cement is the most common type of cement in general usage. It is a basic ingredient of concrete, mortar, and many plasters. It consists of a mixture of calcium silicates (alite, belite), aluminates and ferrites—compounds, which will react with water. Portland cement and similar materials are made by heating limestone (a source of calcium) with clay or shale (a source of silicon, aluminium and iron) and grinding this product (called clinker) with a source of sulfate (most commonly gypsum).

Cement kilns are extremely large, complex, and inherently dusty industrial installations. Of the various ingredients used to produce a given quantity of concrete, the cement is the most energetically expensive. Even complex and efficient kilns require 3.3 to 3.6 gigajoules of energy to produce a ton of clinker and then grind it into cement. Many kilns can be fueled with difficult-to-dispose-of wastes, the most common being used tires. The extremely high temperatures and long periods of time at those temperatures allows cement kilns to efficiently and completely burn even difficult-to-use fuels. The five major compounds of calcium silicates and aluminates comprising Portland cement range from 5 to 50% in weight.

=== Curing ===
Combining water with a cementitious material forms a cement paste by the process of hydration. The cement paste glues the aggregate together, fills voids within it, and makes it flow more freely.

As stated by Abrams' law, a lower water-to-cement ratio yields a stronger, more durable concrete, whereas more water gives a freer-flowing concrete with a higher slump. The hydration of cement involves many concurrent reactions. The process involves polymerization, the interlinking of the silicates and aluminate components as well as their bonding to sand and gravel particles to form a solid mass. One illustrative conversion is the hydration of tricalcium silicate:

Cement chemist notation: C_{3}S + H → C-S-H + CH + heat
Standard notation: Ca_{3}SiO_{5} + H_{2}O → CaO・SiO_{2}・H_{2}O (gel) + Ca(OH)_{2} + heat
Balanced: 2 Ca_{3}SiO_{5} + 7 H_{2}O → 3 CaO・2 SiO_{2}・4 H_{2}O (gel) + 3 Ca(OH)_{2} + heat
(approximately as the exact ratios of CaO, SiO_{2} and H_{2}O in C-S-H can vary)

The hydration (curing) of cement is irreversible.

Curing Method	Description
Wet curing	Wet curing is a method in which coverings are hydrated repeatedly with methods such as misting or soaking.
Slab curing	Slab curing is a method in which a curing blanket is applied to a slab of concrete, doused in water, and kept wet for 28 days.
Hot mixing	Hot mixing is a method in which heat is introduced while the concrete is being mixed.
Electrical curing	Electrical curing is a method that utilizes electrical currents to cure concrete. A metal plate is placed on either side of a concrete slab, and electrical currents are passed through it.
Infrared curing	Infrared curing is a method used for hollow concrete. An infrared heater is placed inside the concrete, which accelerates the curing process. Colder climates favor this method.
Pipe water curing	Pipe water curing is a method in which pipes are set in the middle of the concrete to absorb heat. Water flows through the pipes to reduce the temperature of the concrete.

=== Aggregates ===
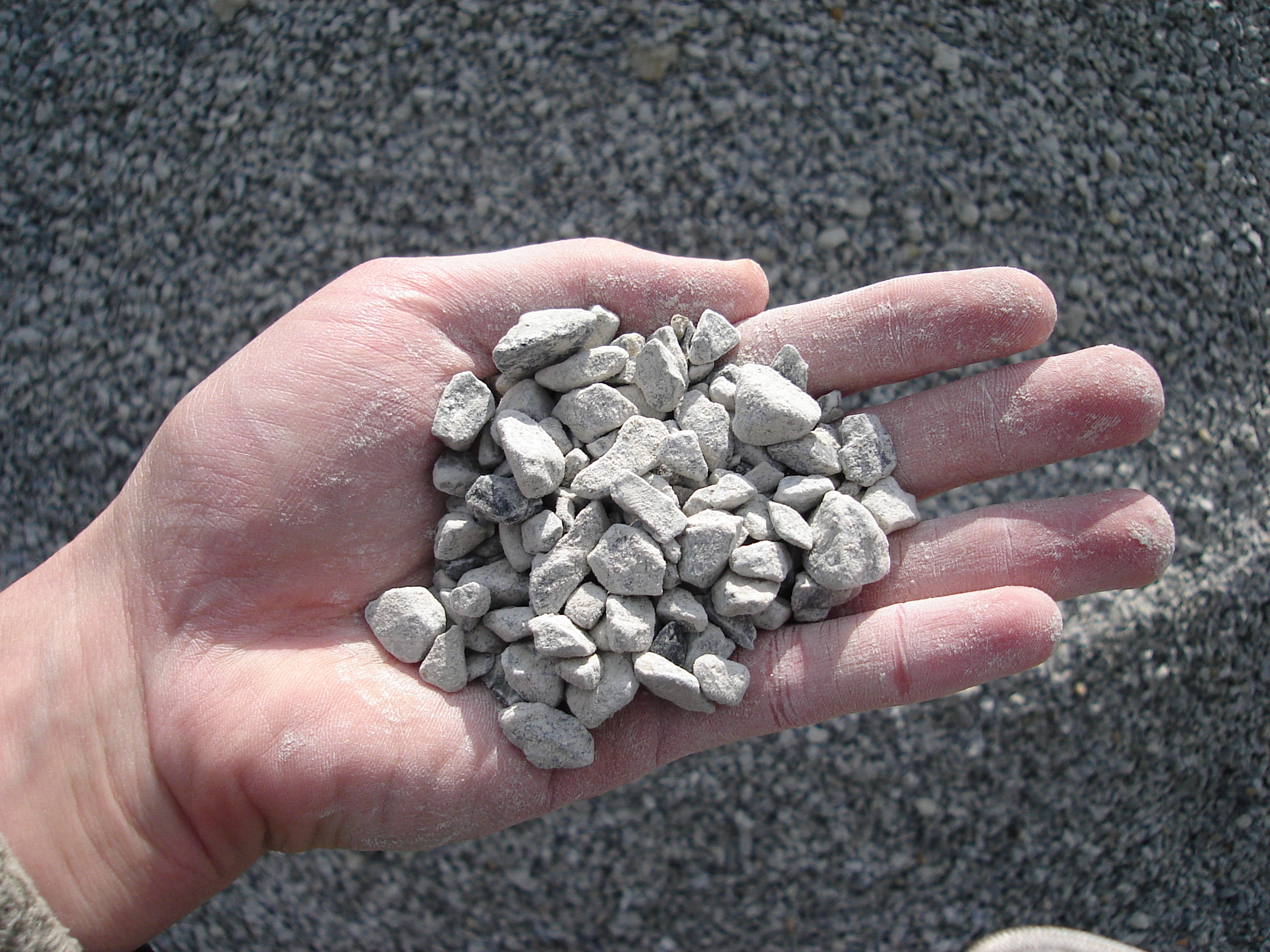
Crushed stone aggregates

Fine and coarse aggregates make up the bulk of a concrete mixture. Sand, natural gravel, and crushed stone are used mainly for this purpose. Recycled aggregates (from construction, demolition, and excavation waste) are increasingly used as partial replacements for natural aggregates, while a number of manufactured aggregates, including air-cooled blast furnace slag and bottom ash are also permitted.

The size distribution of the aggregate determines how much binder is required. Aggregate with a very even size distribution has the biggest gaps whereas adding aggregate with smaller particles tends to fill these gaps. The binder must fill the gaps between the aggregate as well as paste the surfaces of the aggregate together, and is typically the most expensive component. Thus, variation in sizes of the aggregate reduces the cost of concrete. The aggregate is nearly always stronger than the binder, so its use does not negatively affect the strength of the concrete.

Redistribution of aggregates after compaction often creates non-homogeneity due to the influence of vibration. This can lead to strength gradients.

Decorative stones such as quartzite, small river stones or crushed glass are sometimes added to the surface of concrete for a decorative "exposed aggregate" finish, popular among landscape designers.

=== Admixtures ===
Admixtures are materials in the form of powder or fluids that are added to the concrete to give it certain characteristics not obtainable with plain concrete mixes. Admixtures are defined as additions "made as the concrete mix is being prepared". The most common admixtures are retarders and accelerators. In normal use, admixture dosages are less than 5% by mass of cement and are added to the concrete at the time of batching/mixing. (See § Production below.) The common types of admixtures are as follows:

- Accelerators speed up the hydration (hardening) of the concrete. Typical materials used are calcium chloride, calcium nitrate and sodium nitrate. However, use of chlorides may cause corrosion in steel reinforcing and is prohibited in some countries, so nitrates may be favored, even though they are less effective than the chloride salt. Accelerating admixtures are especially useful for modifying the properties of concrete in cold weather.
- Air entraining agents add and entrain tiny air bubbles in the concrete, which reduces damage during freeze-thaw cycles, increasing durability. However, entrained air entails a tradeoff with strength, as each 1% of air may decrease compressive strength by 5%. If too much air becomes trapped in the concrete as a result of the mixing process, defoamers can be used to encourage the air bubble to agglomerate, rise to the surface of the wet concrete and then disperse.
- Bonding agents are used to create a bond between old and new concrete (typically a type of polymer) with wide temperature tolerance and corrosion resistance.
- Corrosion inhibitors are used to minimize the corrosion of steel and steel bars in concrete.
- Crystalline admixtures are typically added during batching of the concrete to lower permeability. The reaction takes place when exposed to water and unhydrated cement particles to form insoluble needle-shaped crystals, which fill capillary pores and micro-cracks in the concrete to block pathways for water and waterborne contaminants. Concrete with crystalline admixture can expect to self-seal as constant exposure to water will continuously initiate crystallization to ensure permanent waterproof protection.
- Pigments can be used to change the color of concrete, for aesthetics.
- Plasticizers increase the workability of plastic, or "fresh", concrete, allowing it to be placed more easily, with less consolidating effort. A typical plasticizer is lignosulfonate. Plasticizers can be used to reduce the water content of a concrete while maintaining workability and are sometimes called water-reducers due to this use. Such treatment improves its strength and durability characteristics.
- Superplasticizers (also called high-range water-reducers) are a class of plasticizers that have fewer deleterious effects and can be used to increase workability more than is practical with traditional plasticizers. Superplasticizers are used to increase compressive strength. It increases the workability of the concrete and lowers the need for water content by 15–30%.
- Pumping aids improve pumpability, thicken the paste and reduce separation and bleeding.
- Retarders slow the hydration of concrete and are used in large or difficult pours where partial setting is undesirable before completion of the pour. Widely used in hot-weather concreting and mass concrete applications to control setting time and reduce the risk of cold joints.Typical retarders include sugar, sodium gluconate, citric acid, and tartaric acid.

=== Mineral admixtures and blended cements ===
Components of cement: comparison of chemical and physical characteristics (Note: Values shown are approximate: those of a specific material may vary.)
Property		Portland cement	Siliceous (Note: ASTM C618 Class F) fly ash	Calcareous (Note: ASTM C618 Class C) fly ash	Slag cement	Silica fume
Proportion by mass (%)	SiO_{2}	21.9	52	35	35	85–97
Proportion by mass (%)	Al_{2}O_{3}	6.9	23	18	12	—
Proportion by mass (%)	Fe_{2}O_{3}	3	11	6	1	—
Proportion by mass (%)	CaO	63	5	21	40	< 1
Proportion by mass (%)	MgO	2.5	—	—	—	—
Proportion by mass (%)	SO_{3}	1.7	—	—	—	—
Specific surface (m^{2}/kg) (Note: Specific surface measurements for silica fume by nitrogen adsorption (BET) method, others by air permeability method (Blaine).)		370	420	420	400	15,000 – 30,000
Specific gravity		3.15	2.38	2.65	2.94	2.22
General purpose		Primary binder	Cement replacement	Cement replacement	Cement replacement	Property enhancer

Inorganic materials that have pozzolanic or latent hydraulic properties; these very fine-grained materials are added to the concrete mix to improve the properties of concrete (mineral admixtures), or as a replacement for Portland cement (blended cements). Products which incorporate limestone, fly ash, blast furnace slag, and other useful materials with pozzolanic properties into the mix, are being tested and used. These developments are ever growing in relevance to minimize the impacts caused by cement use, notorious for being one of the largest producers (at about 5 to 10%) of global greenhouse gas emissions. The use of alternative materials also is capable of lowering costs, improving concrete properties, and recycling wastes, the latest being relevant for circular economy aspects of the construction industry, whose demand is ever growing with greater impacts on raw material extraction, waste generation and landfill practices.

- Fly ash: A by-product of coal-fired electric generating plants, it is used to partially replace Portland cement (by up to 60% by mass). The properties of fly ash depend on the type of coal burnt. In general, siliceous fly ash is pozzolanic, while calcareous fly ash has latent hydraulic properties.
- Ground granulated blast furnace slag (GGBFS or GGBS): A by-product of steel production is used to partially replace Portland cement (by up to 80% by mass). It has latent hydraulic properties.
- Silica fume: A by-product of the production of silicon and ferrosilicon alloys. Silica fume is similar to fly ash, but has a particle size 100 times smaller. This results in a higher surface-to-volume ratio and a much faster pozzolanic reaction. Silica fume is used to increase strength and durability of concrete, but generally requires the use of superplasticizers for workability.
- High reactivity metakaolin (HRM): Metakaolin produces concrete with strength and durability similar to concrete made with silica fume. While silica fume is usually dark gray or black in color, high-reactivity metakaolin is usually bright white in color, making it the preferred choice for architectural concrete where appearance is important.
- Carbon nanofibers can be added to concrete to enhance compressive strength and gain a higher Young's modulus, and also to improve the electrical properties required for strain monitoring, damage evaluation and self-health monitoring of concrete. Carbon fiber has many advantages in terms of mechanical and electrical properties (e.g., higher strength) and self-monitoring behavior due to the high tensile strength and high electrical conductivity.
- Carbon products have been added to make concrete electrically conductive, for deicing purposes.
- New research from Japan's University of Kitakyushu shows that a washed and dried recycled mix of used diapers can be an environmental solution to producing less landfill and using less sand in concrete production. A model home was built in Indonesia to test the strength and durability of the new diaper-cement composite.

== Production ==
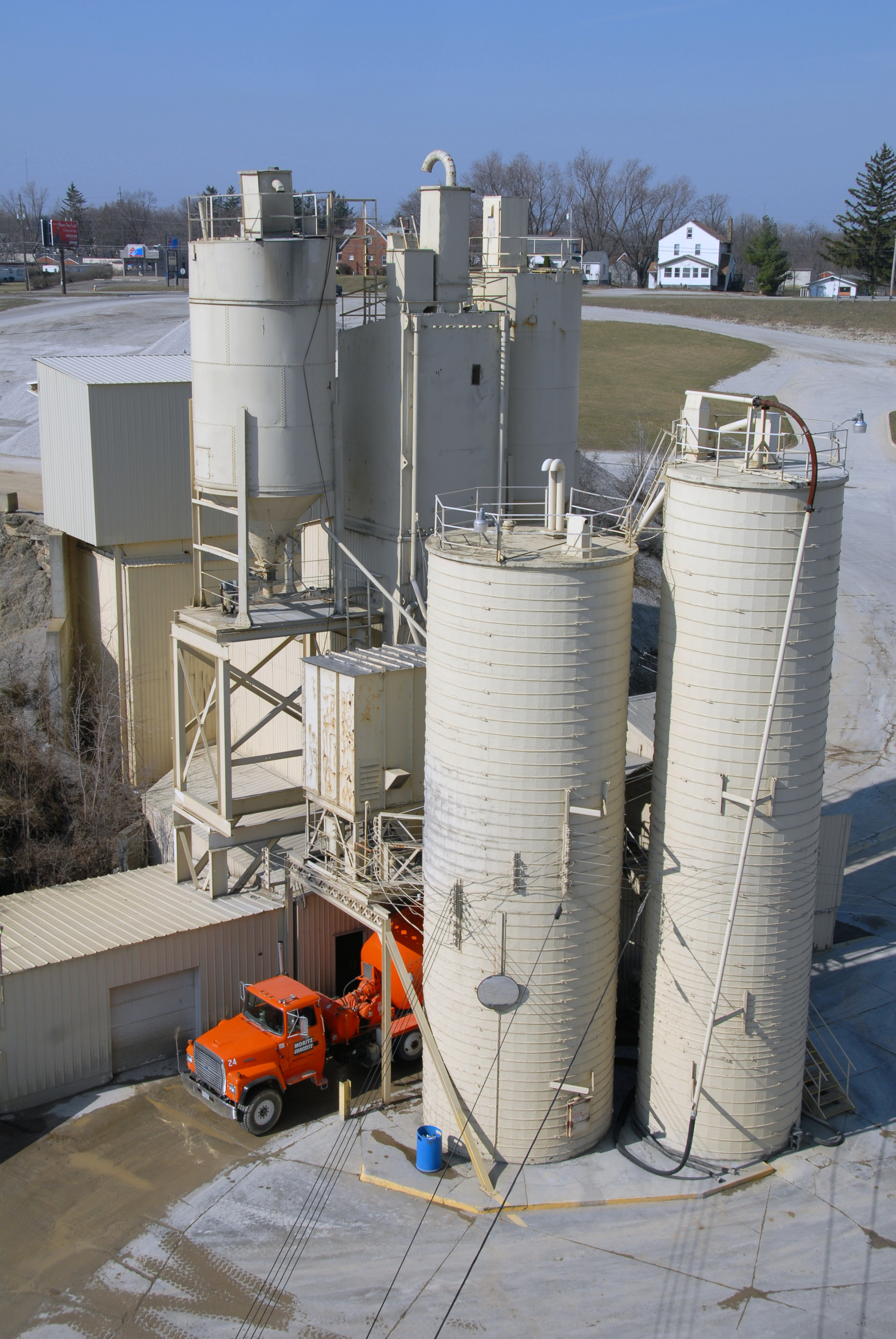
Concrete plant showing a concrete mixer being filled from ingredient silos

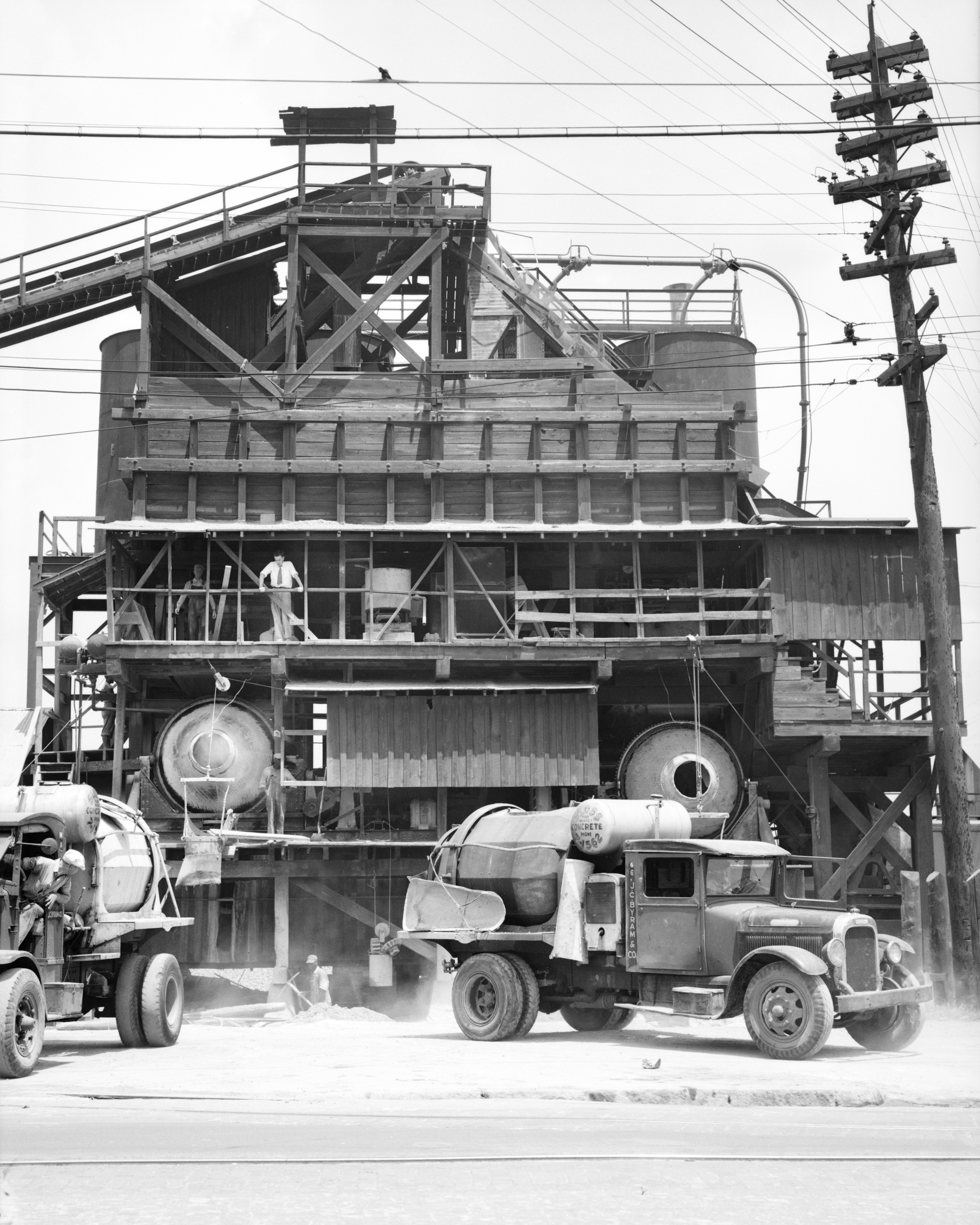
Concrete mixing plant in Birmingham, Alabama, in 1936

Concrete production is the process of mixing the various ingredients—water, aggregate, cement, and any additives—to produce concrete. Concrete production is time-sensitive. Once the ingredients are mixed, workers must put the concrete in place before it hardens. In modern usage, most concrete production takes place in a large type of industrial facility called a concrete plant, or often a batch plant. The usual method of placement is casting in formwork, which holds the mix in shape until it has set enough to hold its shape unaided.

Concrete plants come in two main types, ready-mix plants and central mix plants. A ready-mix plant blends all of the solid ingredients, while a central mix does the same but adds water. A central-mix plant offers more precise control of the concrete quality. Central mix plants must be close to the work site where the concrete will be used, since hydration begins at the plant.

A concrete plant consists of large hoppers for storage of various ingredients like cement, storage for bulk ingredients like aggregate and water, mechanisms for the addition of various additives and amendments, machinery to accurately weigh, move, and mix some or all of those ingredients, and facilities to dispense the mixed concrete, often to a concrete mixer truck.

Modern concrete is usually prepared as a viscous fluid, so that it may be poured into forms. The forms are containers that define the desired shape. Concrete formwork can be prepared in several ways, such as slip forming and steel plate construction. Alternatively, concrete can be mixed into drier, non-fluid forms and used in factory settings to manufacture precast concrete products.

Interruption in pouring the concrete can cause the initially placed material to begin to set before the next batch is added on top. This creates a horizontal plane of weakness called a cold joint between the two batches. Once the mix is where it should be, the curing process must be controlled to ensure that the concrete attains the desired attributes. During concrete preparation, various technical details may affect the quality and nature of the product.

There are 2 types of mix: Nominal Mix and Design Mix.

=== Nominal Mix ===
Nominal mix is regulated by IS 456:2000. Mixes like M10 Concrete Ratio, M15 Concrete Ratio & M20 Concrete Ratio falls under nominal mix.

Nominal mix concrete are commonly used for general purposes and small structures. If heavy structures like dams, bridges, high rise buildings, etc are to be built then design mix is used.

Grades of Concrete	Concrete Mix Ratio	Compressive Strength
M5	1:5:10	5 MPa
M10	1:3:6	10 MPa
M15	1:2:4	15 MPa
M20	1:1.5:3	20 MPa

=== Design mix ===
Design mix ratios are decided by an engineer after analyzing the properties of the specific ingredients being used. Instead of using a 'nominal mix' of 1 part cement, 2 parts sand, and 4 parts aggregate, a civil engineer will custom-design a concrete mix to exactly meet the requirements of the site and conditions, setting material ratios and often designing an admixture package to fine-tune the properties or increase the performance envelope of the mix. Design-mix concrete can have very broad specifications that cannot be met with more basic nominal mixes, but the involvement of the engineer often increases the cost of the concrete mix.

Concrete mixes are primarily divided into nominal mix, standard mix and design mix.

Nominal mix ratios are given in volume of $\text{Cement : Sand : Aggregate}$. Nominal mixes are a simple way of getting a basic idea of the properties of the finished concrete without having to perform testing in advance.

Various governing bodies (such as British Standards) define nominal mix ratios into a number of grades, usually ranging from lower compressive strength to higher compressive strength. The grades usually indicate the 28-day cure strength.

=== Mixing ===
Thorough mixing is essential to produce uniform, high-quality concrete.

Separate paste mixing has shown that the mixing of cement and water into a paste before combining these materials with aggregates can increase the compressive strength of the resulting concrete. The paste is generally mixed in a high-speed, shear-type mixer at a w/c (water to cement ratio) of 0.30 to 0.45 by mass. The cement paste premix may include admixtures such as accelerators or retarders, superplasticizers, pigments, or silica fume. The premixed paste is then blended with aggregates and any remaining batch water and final mixing is completed in conventional concrete mixing equipment.

Resonant acoustic mixing has also been found effective in producing ultra-high performance cementitious materials, as it produces a dense matrix with low porosity.

=== Sample analysis—workability ===
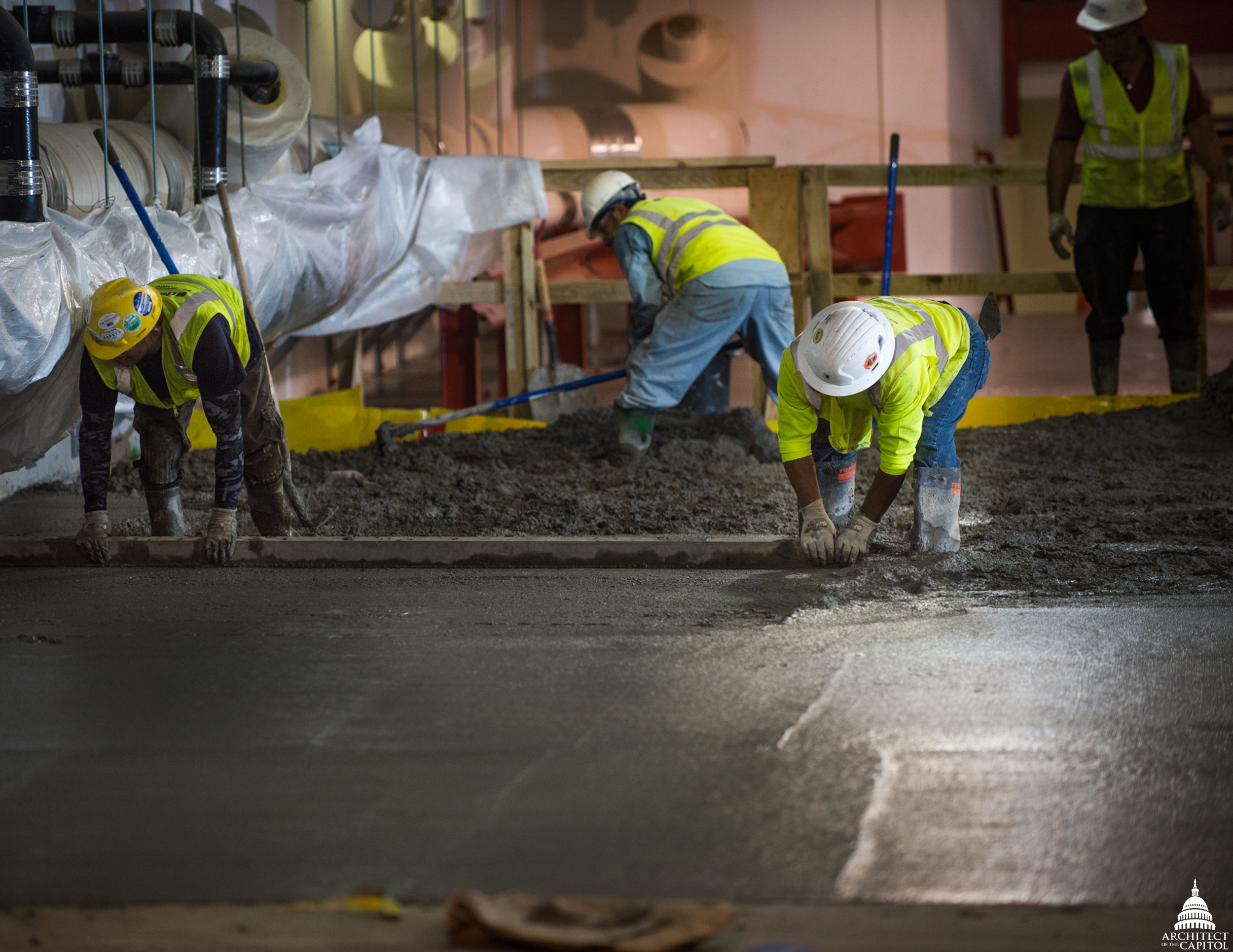
Concrete floor of a parking garage being placed

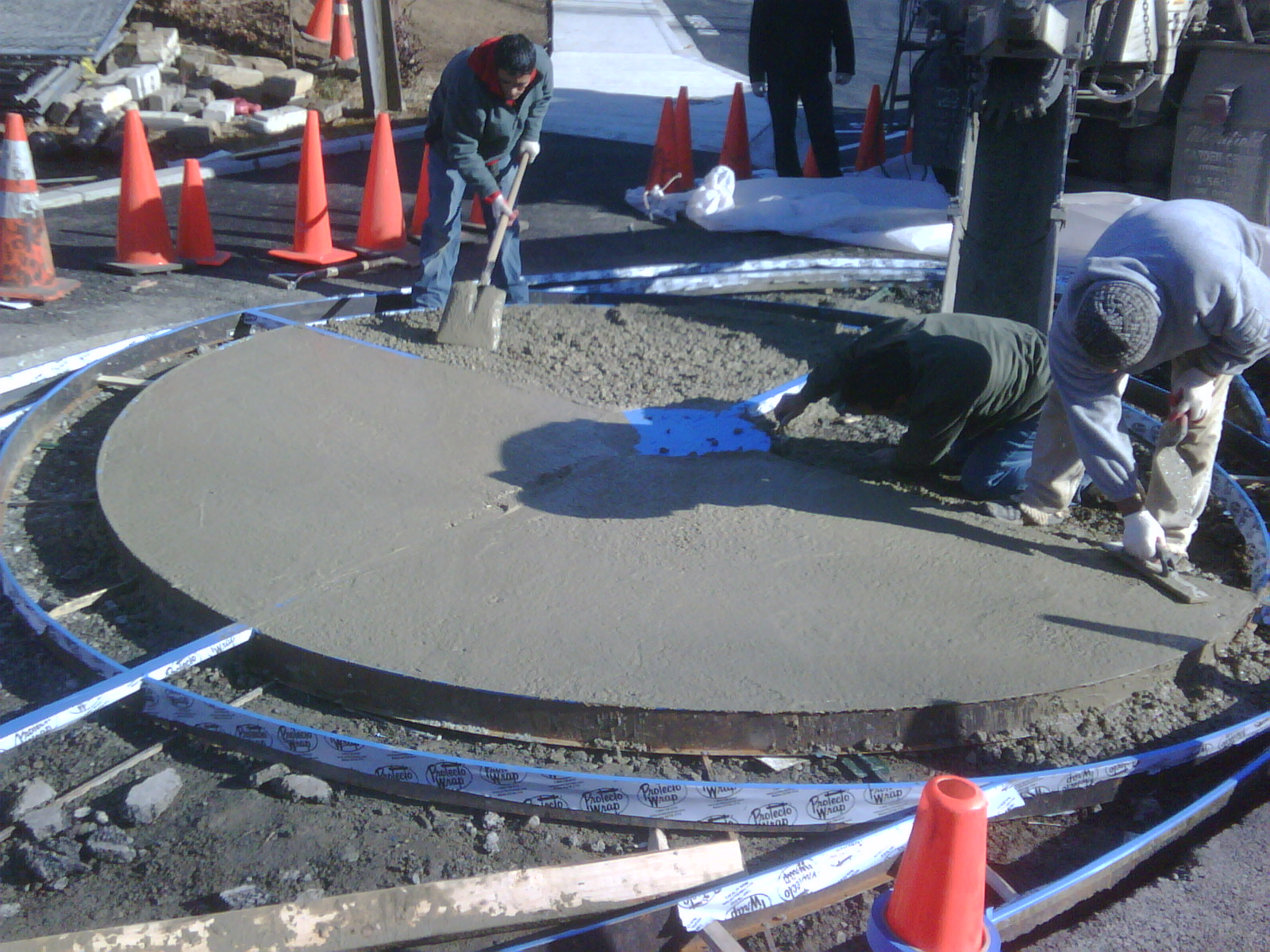
Pouring and smoothing out concrete at Palisades Park in Washington, DC

Workability is the ability of a fresh (plastic) concrete mix to fill the form/mold properly with the desired work (pouring, pumping, spreading, tamping, vibration) and without reducing the concrete's quality. Workability depends on water content, aggregate (shape and size distribution), cementitious content and age (level of hydration) and can be modified by adding chemical admixtures, like superplasticizer. Raising the water content or adding chemical admixtures increases concrete workability. Excessive water leads to increased bleeding or segregation of aggregates (when the cement and aggregates start to separate), with the resulting concrete having reduced quality. Changes in gradation can also affect workability of the concrete, although a wide range of gradation can be used for various applications. An undesirable gradation can mean using a large aggregate that is too large for the size of the formwork, or which has too few smaller aggregate grades to serve to fill the gaps between the larger grades, or using too little or too much sand for the same reason, or using too little water, or too much cement, or even using jagged crushed stone instead of smoother round aggregate such as pebbles. Any combination of these factors and others may result in a mix which is too harsh, i.e., which does not flow or spread out smoothly, is difficult to get into the formwork, and which is difficult to surface finish.

Workability can be measured by the concrete slump test, a simple measure of the plasticity of a fresh batch of concrete following the ASTM C 143 or EN 12350-2 test standards. Slump is normally measured by filling an "Abrams cone" with a sample from a fresh batch of concrete. The cone is placed with the wide end down onto a level, non-absorptive surface. It is then filled in three layers of equal volume, with each layer being tamped with a steel rod to consolidate the layer. When the cone is carefully lifted off, the enclosed material slumps a certain amount, owing to gravity. A relatively dry sample slumps very little, having a slump value of one to two inches (25 to 51 mm) out of one foot (300 mm). A relatively wet concrete sample may slump as much as eight inches (200 mm). Workability can also be measured by the flow table test.

Slump can be increased by addition of chemical admixtures such as plasticizer or superplasticizer without changing the water-cement ratio. Some other admixtures, especially air-entraining admixture, can increase the slump of a mix.

High-flow concrete, like self-consolidating concrete, is tested by other flow-measuring methods. One of these methods includes placing the cone on the narrow end and observing how the mix flows through the cone while it is gradually lifted.

After mixing, concrete is a fluid and can be pumped to the location where needed.

=== Curing ===
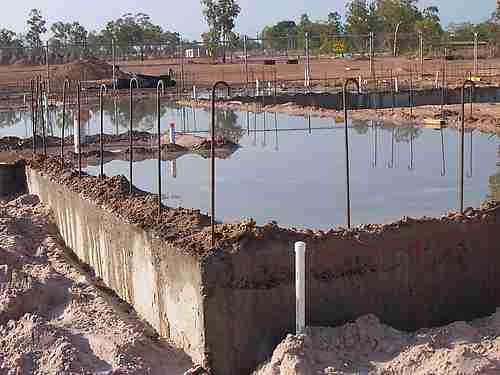
A concrete slab being kept hydrated during water curing by submersion (ponding)

==== Maintaining optimal conditions for cement hydration ====
Concrete must be kept moist during curing to achieve optimal strength and durability. During curing hydration occurs, allowing calcium-silicate hydrate (CaO-SiO_{2}-H_{2}O, or "C-S-H" in cement chemist notation) to form. Over 90% of a mix's final strength is typically reached within four weeks, with the remaining 10% achieved over years or even decades. The conversion of calcium hydroxide in the concrete into calcium carbonate from absorption of CO_{2} over several decades further strengthens the concrete and makes it more resistant to damage. This carbonation reaction, however, lowers the pH of the cement pore solution and can corrode the reinforcement bars.

Hydration and hardening of concrete during the first three days is critical. Abnormally fast drying and shrinkage due to factors such as evaporation from wind during placement may lead to increased tensile stresses at a time when it has not yet gained sufficient strength, resulting in greater shrinkage cracking. The early strength of the concrete can be increased if it is kept damp during the curing process. Minimizing stress before curing minimizes cracking. High-early-strength concrete is designed to hydrate faster, often by increased use of cement that increases shrinkage and cracking. The strength of concrete changes (increases) for up to three years, depending on the cross-section dimension of elements, and conditions to which the structure is exposed. Addition of short-cut polymer fibers can improve (reduce) shrinkage-induced stresses during curing and increase early and ultimate compression strength.

Properly curing concrete leads to increased strength and lower permeability and avoids cracking where the surface dries out prematurely. Care must also be taken to avoid freezing or overheating due to the exothermic setting of cement. Improper curing can cause spalling, reduced strength, poor abrasion resistance and cracking.

==== Curing techniques avoiding water loss by evaporation ====
During the curing period, concrete is ideally maintained at controlled temperature and humidity. To ensure full hydration during curing, concrete slabs are often sprayed with "curing compounds" that create a water-retaining film over the concrete. Typical films are made of wax or related hydrophobic compounds. After the concrete is sufficiently cured, the film is allowed to abrade from the concrete through normal use.

Traditional conditions for curing involve spraying or ponding the concrete surface with water. The adjacent picture shows one of many ways to achieve this, ponding—submerging setting concrete in water and wrapping it in plastic to prevent dehydration. Additional common curing methods include wet burlap and plastic sheeting covering the fresh concrete.

For higher-strength applications, accelerated curing techniques may be applied to the concrete. A common technique involves heating the poured concrete with steam, which serves to both keep it damp and raise the temperature so that the hydration process proceeds more quickly and more thoroughly.

== Alternative types ==
=== Asphalt ===
Asphalt concrete (commonly called asphalt, blacktop, or pavement in North America, and tarmac, bitumen macadam, or rolled asphalt in the United Kingdom and Ireland) is a composite material commonly used to surface roads, parking lots, airports, as well as the core of embankment dams. Asphalt mixtures have been used in pavement construction since the beginning of the twentieth century. It consists of mineral aggregate bound together with asphalt, laid in layers, and compacted. The process was refined and enhanced by Belgian inventor and U.S. immigrant Edward De Smedt.

The terms asphalt (or asphaltic) concrete, bituminous asphalt concrete, and bituminous mixture are typically used only in engineering and construction documents, which define concrete as any composite material composed of mineral aggregate adhered with a binder. The abbreviation, AC, is sometimes used for asphalt concrete but can also denote asphalt content, aerated concrete, or asphalt cement, referring to the liquid asphalt portion of the composite material.

=== Geopolymer concrete ===
Geopolymer concrete is concrete made with geopolymer cement consisting of aluminosilicates which react with an acid or alkaline binder. Notably, this avoids the use of lime, whose production is a major source of CO2 pollution.

=== Graphene enhanced concrete ===
Graphene-enhanced concretes are standard designs of concrete mixes, except that during the cement-mixing or production process, a small amount of chemically engineered graphene (typically < 0.5% by weight) is added. These enhanced graphene concretes are designed around the concrete application.

=== Microbial ===
Bacteria such as Bacillus pasteurii, Bacillus pseudofirmus, Bacillus cohnii, Sporosarcina pasteuri, and Arthrobacter crystallopoietes increase the compression strength of concrete through their biomass. Bacillus sp. CT-5. can reduce corrosion of reinforcement in reinforced concrete by up to four times. Sporosarcina pasteurii reduces water and chloride permeability. B. pasteurii increases resistance to acid. Bacillus pasteurii and B. sphaericuscan induce calcium carbonate precipitation in the surface of cracks, adding compression strength. However some forms of bacteria can also be concrete-destroying.

=== Nanoconcrete ===
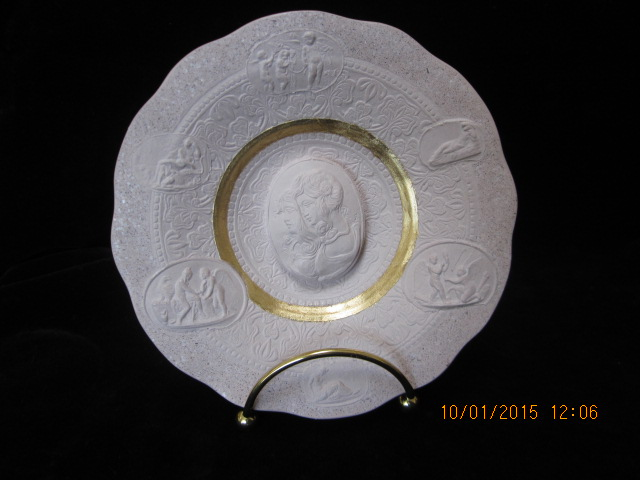
Decorative plate made of Nano concrete with High-Energy Mixing (HEM)

Nanoconcrete (also spelled "nano concrete"' or "nano-concrete") is a class of materials that contains Portland cement particles that are no greater than 100 μm and particles of silica no greater than 500 μm, which fill voids that would otherwise occur in normal concrete, thereby substantially increasing the material's strength. It is widely used in foot and highway bridges where high flexural and compressive strength are indicated.

=== Pervious ===
Pervious concrete is a mix of specially graded coarse aggregate, cement, water, and little-to-no fine aggregates. This concrete is also known as "no-fines" or porous concrete. Mixing the ingredients in a carefully controlled process creates a paste that coats and bonds the aggregate particles. The hardened concrete contains interconnected air voids totaling approximately 15 to 25 percent. Water runs through the voids in the pavement to the soil underneath. Air entrainment admixtures are often used in freeze-thaw climates to minimize the possibility of frost damage. Pervious concrete also permits rainwater to filter through roads and parking lots, to recharge aquifers, instead of contributing to runoff and flooding.

=== Polymer ===
Polymer concretes are mixtures of aggregate and any of various polymers and may be reinforced. The cement is costlier than lime-based cements, but polymer concretes nevertheless have advantages; they have significant tensile strength even without reinforcement, and they are largely impervious to water. Polymer concretes are frequently used for the repair and construction of other applications, such as drains.

=== Plant fibers ===
Plant fibers and particles can be used in a concrete mix or as a reinforcement.These materials can increase ductility but the lignocellulosic particles hydrolyze during concrete curing as a result of alkaline environment and elevated temperatures. Such process, that is difficult to measure, can affect the properties of the resulting concrete.

=== Sulfur concrete ===
Sulfur concrete is a special concrete that uses sulfur as a binder and does not require cement or water.

=== Volcanic ===
Volcanic concrete substitutes volcanic rock for the limestone that is burned to form clinker. It consumes a similar amount of energy, but does not directly emit carbon as a byproduct. Volcanic rock/ash are used as supplementary cementitious materials in concrete to improve the resistance to sulfate, chloride and alkali silica reaction due to pore refinement. Also, they are generally cost-effective in comparison to other aggregates, good for semi- and light-weight concretes, and good for thermal and acoustic insulation.

Pyroclastic materials, such as pumice, scoria, and ashes are formed from cooling magma during explosive volcanic eruptions. They are used as supplementary cementitious materials or as aggregates for cements and concretes. They have been extensively used since ancient times to produce materials for building applications. For example, pumice and other volcanic glasses were added as a natural pozzolanic material for mortars and plasters during the construction of the Villa San Marco in the Roman period (89 BC – 79 AD), which remain one of the best-preserved otium villae of the Bay of Naples in Italy.

=== Waste light ===
Waste light is a form of polymer modified concrete. The specific polymer admixture allows the replacement of all the traditional aggregates (gravel, sand, stone) by any mixture of solid waste materials in the grain size of 3–10 mm to form a low-compressive-strength (3–20 N/mm^{2}) product for road and building construction. One cubic meter of waste light concrete contains 1.1–1.3 m^{3} of shredded waste and no other aggregates.

=== Recycled Aggregate Concrete (RAC) ===
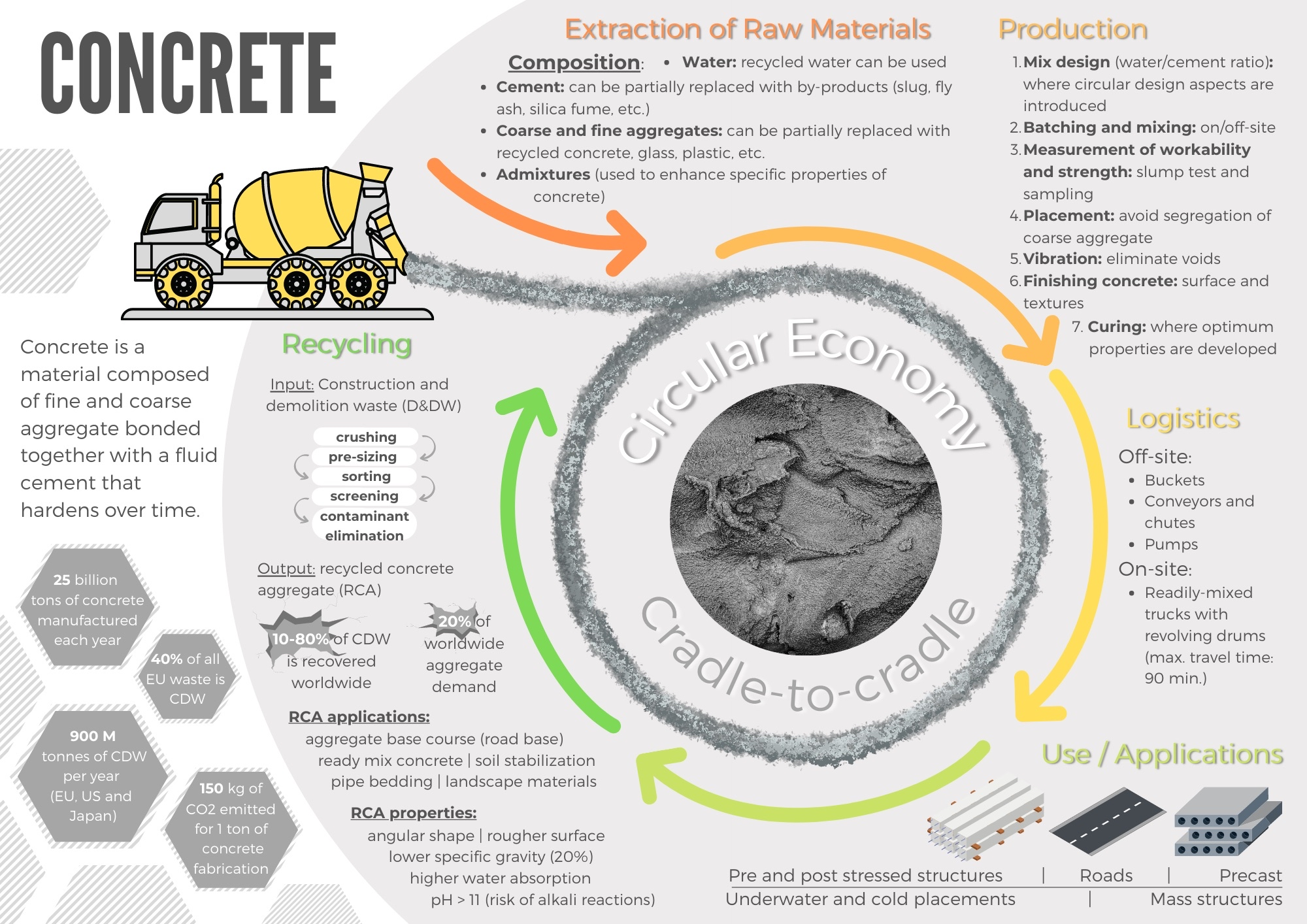
Infographic of the circularity of concrete from cradle-to-cradle

Recycled aggregate concretes are standard concrete mixes with the addition or substitution of natural aggregates with recycled aggregates sourced from construction and demolition wastes, disused pre-cast concrete or masonry. In most cases, recycled aggregate concrete results in higher water absorption levels by capillary action and permeation, which are the prominent determiners of the strength and durability of the resulting concrete. The increase in water absorption levels is mainly caused by the porous adhered mortar that exists in the recycled aggregates. Accordingly, recycled concrete aggregates that have been washed to reduce the quantity of mortar adhered to aggregates show lower water absorption levels compared to untreated recycled aggregates.

The quality of the recycled aggregate concrete is determined by several factors, including the size, the number of replacement cycles, and the moisture levels of the recycled aggregates. When the recycled concrete aggregates are crushed into coarser fractures, the mixed concrete demonstrates better permeability levels, resulting in an overall increase in strength. In contrast, recycled masonry aggregates provide better qualities when crushed into finer fractures. With each generation of recycled concrete, the resulting compressive strength decreases.

== Properties ==
Concrete has relatively high compressive strength, but much lower tensile strength. Therefore, it is usually reinforced with materials that are strong in tension (often steel). The elasticity of concrete is relatively constant at low stress levels but starts decreasing at higher stress levels as matrix cracking develops. Concrete has a very low coefficient of thermal expansion and shrinks as it matures. All concrete structures crack to some extent, due to shrinkage and tension. Concrete that is subjected to long-duration forces is prone to creep.

Tests can be performed to ensure that the properties of concrete correspond to specifications for the application.

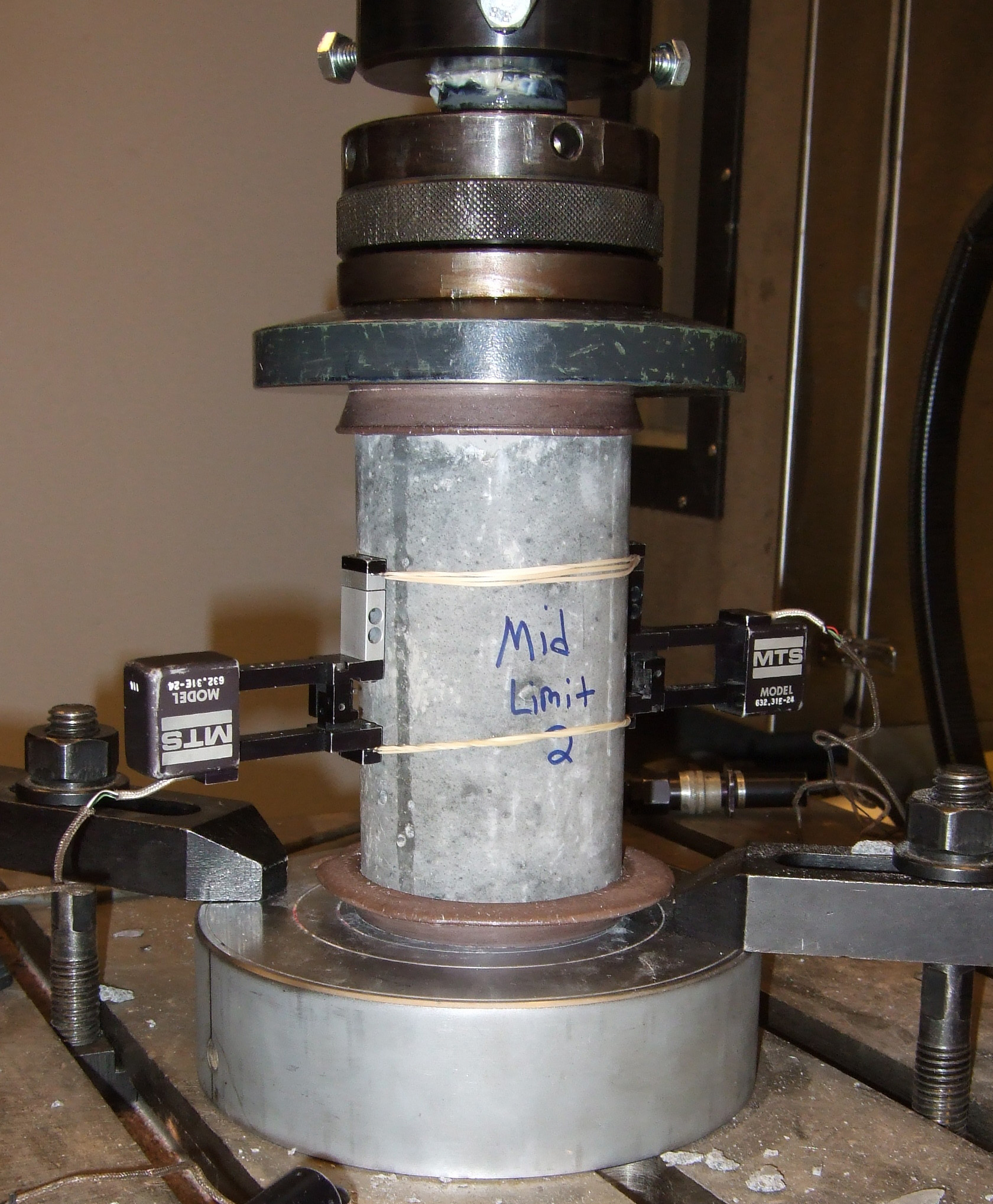
Compression testing of a concrete cylinder

The ingredients affect the strengths of the material. Concrete strength values are usually specified as the lower-bound compressive strength of either a cylindrical or cubic specimen as determined by standard test procedures.

The strengths of concrete are dictated by its function. Very low-strength—14 MPa (2,000 psi) or less—concrete may be used when the concrete must be lightweight. Lightweight concrete is often achieved by adding air, foams, or lightweight aggregates, with the side effect that the strength is reduced. For most routine uses, 20 to 32 MPa (2,900 to 4,600 psi) concrete is often used. 40 MPa (5,800 psi) concrete is readily commercially available as a more durable, although more expensive, option. Higher-strength concrete is often used for larger civil projects. Strengths above 40 MPa (5,800 psi) are often used for specific building elements. For example, the lower-floor columns of high-rise concrete buildings may use concrete of 80 MPa (11,600 psi) or more, to keep the size of the columns small. Bridges may use long beams of high-strength concrete to lower the number of spans required. Occasionally, other structural needs may require high-strength concrete. If a structure must be very rigid, concrete of very high strength may be specified, even much stronger than is required to bear the service loads. Strengths as high as 130 MPa (18,900 psi) have been used commercially for these reasons.

=== Energy efficiency ===
The cement produced for making concrete accounts for about 8% of worldwide CO_{2} emissions per year (compared to, e.g., global aviation at 1.9%). The two largest sources of CO_{2} are produced by the cement manufacturing process, arising from (1) the decarbonation reaction of limestone in the cement kiln (T ≈ 950 °C), and (2) from the combustion of fossil fuel to reach the sintering temperature (T ≈ 1450 °C) of cement clinker in the kiln. The energy required for extracting, crushing, and mixing the raw materials (construction aggregates used in the concrete production, and also limestone and clay feeding the cement kiln) is lower. The energy requirement for transportation of ready-mix concrete is also lower because it is produced near the construction site from local resources, typically manufactured within 100 kilometers of the job site. The overall embodied energy of concrete at roughly 1 to 1.5 megajoules per kilogram is therefore lower than for many structural and construction materials.

Once in place, concrete offers great energy efficiency over the lifetime of a building. Concrete walls leak air far less than those made of wood frames. Air leakage accounts for a large percentage of energy loss from a home. The thermal mass properties of concrete increase the efficiency of both residential and commercial buildings. By storing and releasing the energy needed for heating or cooling, concrete's thermal mass delivers year-round benefits by reducing temperature swings inside and minimizing heating and cooling costs. While insulation reduces energy loss through the building envelope, thermal mass uses walls to store and release energy. Modern concrete wall systems use both external insulation and thermal mass to create an energy-efficient building. Insulating concrete forms (ICFs) are hollow blocks or panels made of either insulating foam or rastra that are stacked to form the shape of the walls of a building and then filled with reinforced concrete to create the structure.

=== Fire safety ===
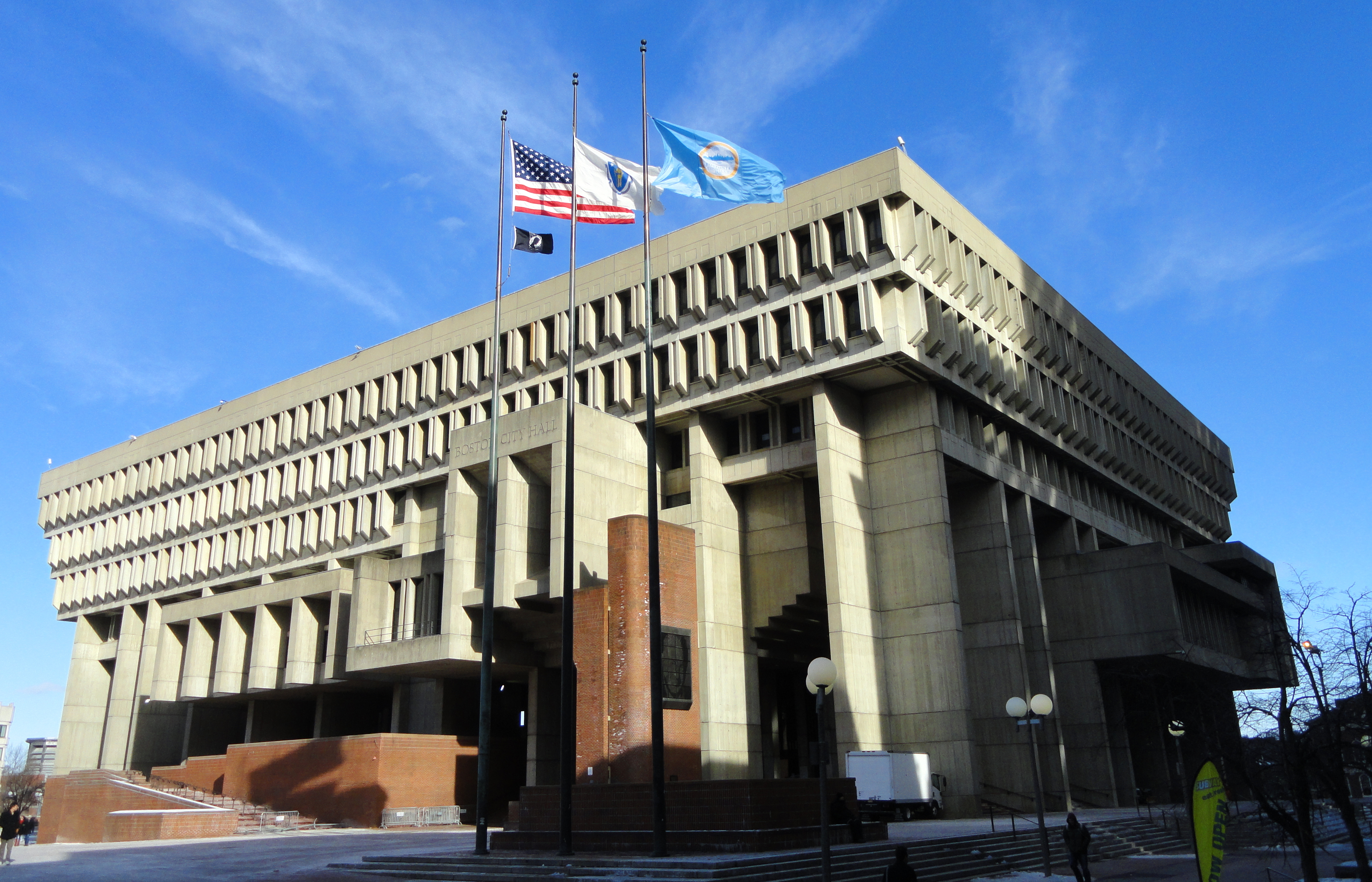
Boston City Hall (1968) is a Brutalist design constructed largely of precast and poured-in-place concrete.

Concrete buildings are more resistant to fire than those constructed using steel frames. Since concrete has lower heat conductivity than steel and can thus last longer under the same fire conditions. Concrete is sometimes used as a fire protection for steel frames, for the same effect as above. Concrete as a fire shield, for example Fondu fyre, can also be used in extreme environments like a missile launch pad.

Options for non-combustible construction include floors, ceilings and roofs made of cast-in-place and hollow-core precast concrete. For walls, concrete masonry technology and Insulating Concrete Forms (ICFs) are additional options. ICFs are hollow blocks or panels made of fireproof insulating foam that are stacked to form the shape of the walls of a building and then filled with reinforced concrete to create the structure.

Concrete also provides good resistance against externally applied forces such as high winds, hurricanes, and tornadoes owing to its lateral stiffness, which results in minimal horizontal movement. However, this stiffness can work against certain types of concrete structures, particularly where a relatively higher flexing structure is required to resist more extreme forces.

=== Earthquake safety ===
As discussed above, concrete is very strong in compression, but weak in tension. Larger earthquakes can generate very large shear loads on structures. These shear loads subject the structure to both tensile and compressive loads. Concrete structures without reinforcement, like other unreinforced masonry structures, can fail during severe earthquake shaking. Unreinforced masonry structures constitute one of the largest earthquake risks globally. These risks can be reduced through seismic retrofitting of at-risk buildings, (e.g. school buildings in Istanbul, Turkey).

== Construction ==
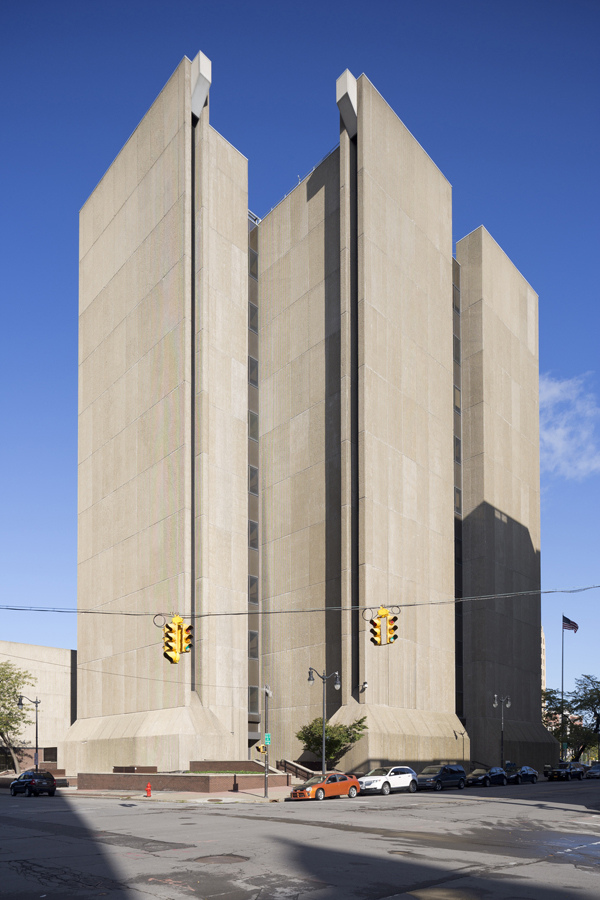
The City Court Building in Buffalo, New York

Concrete is one of the most durable building materials. It provides superior fire resistance compared with wooden construction and gains strength over time. Structures made of concrete can have a long service life. Concrete is used more than any other artificial material in the world. As of 2006, about 7.5 billion cubic meters of concrete are made each year, more than one cubic meter for every person on Earth.

=== Reinforced ===
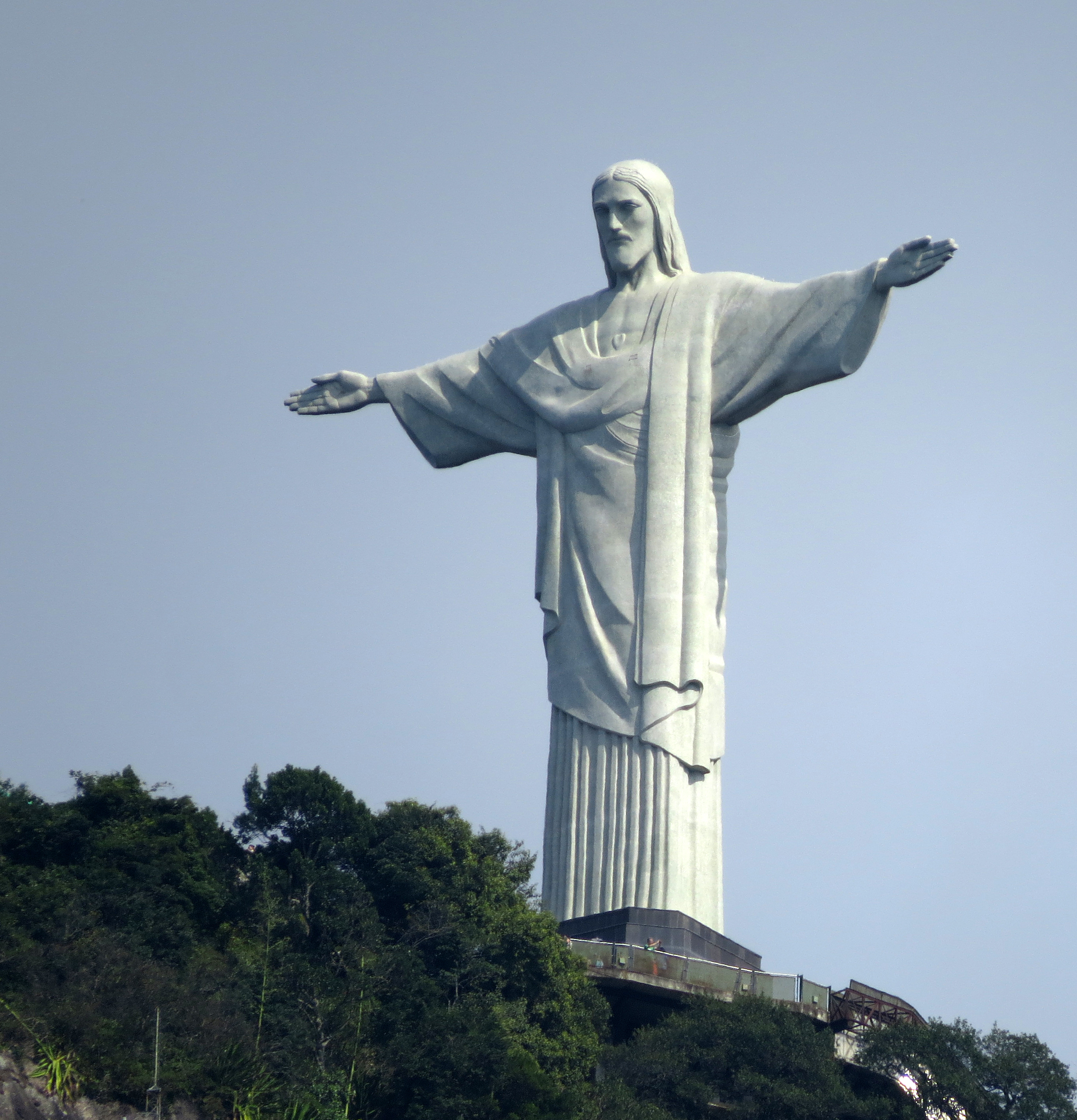
Christ the Redeemer statue in Rio de Janeiro, Brazil. The monument is made of reinforced concrete clad in a mosaic of thousands of triangular soapstone tiles.

The use of reinforcement, in the form of iron was introduced in the 1850s by French industrialist François Coignet, and it was not until the 1880s that German civil engineer G. A. Wayss used steel as reinforcement. Concrete is a relatively brittle material that is strong under compression but less in tension. Unreinforced concrete is unsuitable for many structures as it is relatively poor at withstanding stresses induced by vibrations, wind loading, and so on. Hence, to increase its overall strength, steel rods, wires, mesh or cables can be embedded in concrete before it is set. This reinforcement, often known as rebar, resists tensile forces.

Reinforced concrete (RC) is a versatile composite and one of the most widely used materials in modern construction. It is made up of different constituent materials with very different properties that complement each other. In the case of reinforced concrete, the component materials are almost always concrete and steel. These two materials form a strong bond together and are able to resist a variety of applied forces, effectively acting as a single structural element.

Reinforced concrete can be precast or cast-in-place (in situ) concrete, and is used in a wide range of applications such as slab, wall, beam, column, foundation, and frame construction. Reinforcement is generally placed in areas of the concrete that are likely to be subject to tension, such as the lower portion of beams. Usually, there is a minimum of 50 mm cover, both above and below the steel reinforcement, to resist spalling and corrosion which can lead to structural instability. Other types of non-steel reinforcement, such as Fibre-reinforced concretes are used for specialized applications, predominately as a means of controlling cracking.

=== Precast ===
Precast concrete is concrete which is cast in one place for use elsewhere and is a mobile material. The largest part of precast production is carried out in the works of specialist suppliers, although in some instances, due to economic and geographical factors, scale of product or difficulty of access, the elements are cast on or adjacent to the construction site. Precasting offers considerable advantages because it is carried out in a controlled environment, protected from the elements, but the downside of this is the contribution to greenhouse gas emission from transportation to the construction site.

Advantages to be achieved by employing precast concrete:

- Preferred dimension schemes exist, with elements of tried and tested designs available from a catalogue.
- Major savings in time result from manufacture of structural elements apart from the series of events which determine overall duration of the construction, known by planning engineers as the 'critical path'.
- Availability of Laboratory facilities capable of the required control tests, many being certified for specific testing in accordance with National Standards.
- Equipment with capability suited to specific types of production such as stressing beds with appropriate capacity, moulds and machinery dedicated to particular products.
- High-quality finishes achieved directly from the mould eliminate the need for interior decoration and ensure low maintenance costs.

=== Mass structures ===
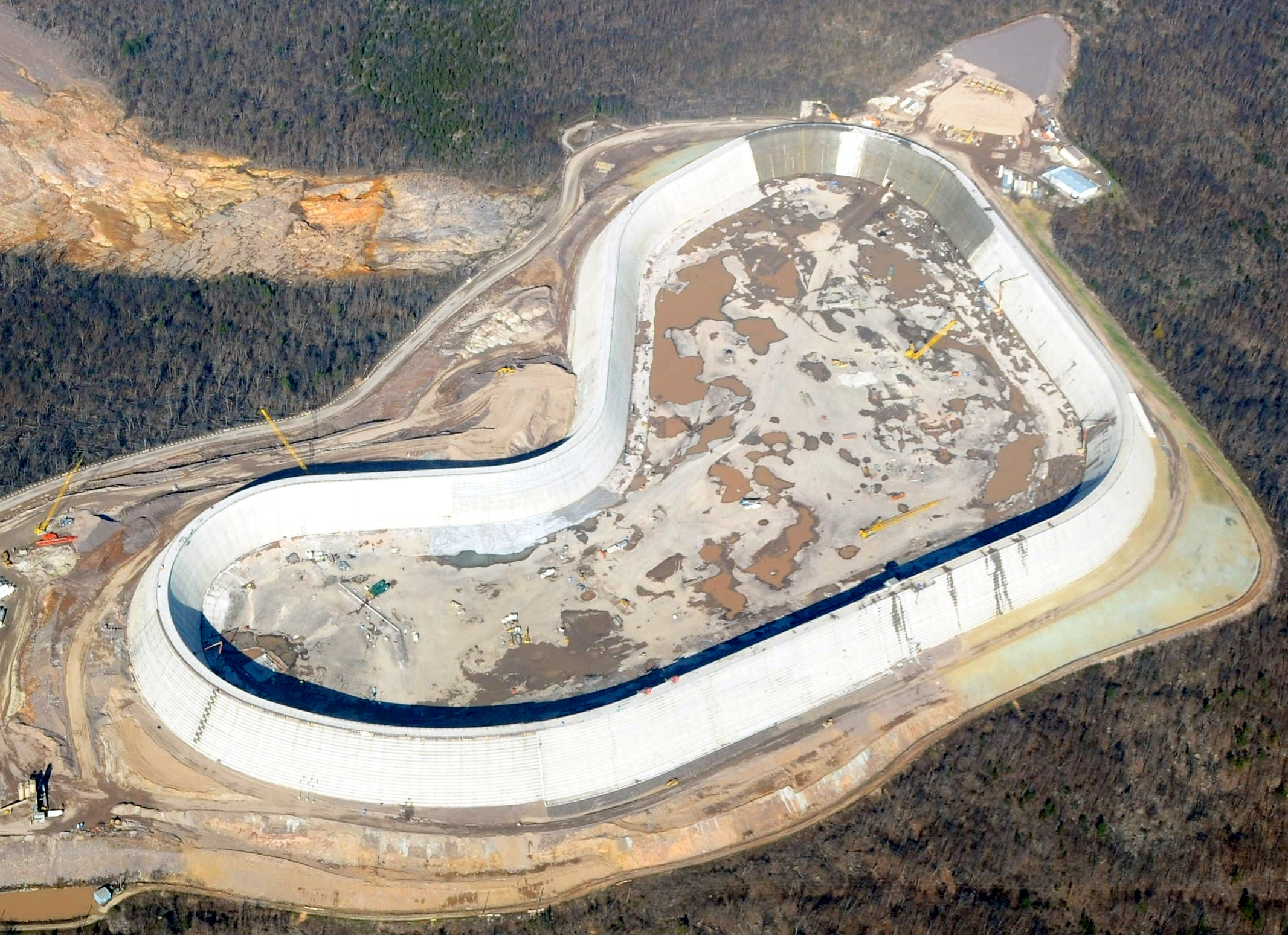
Aerial photo of reconstruction at Taum Sauk (Missouri) pumped storage facility in late November 2009. After the original reservoir failed, the new reservoir was made of roller-compacted concrete.

Due to cement's exothermic chemical reaction while setting up, large concrete structures such as dams, navigation locks, large mat foundations, and large breakwaters generate excessive heat during hydration and associated expansion. To mitigate these effects, post-cooling is commonly applied during construction. An early example at Hoover Dam used a network of pipes between vertical concrete placements to circulate cooling water during the curing process to avoid damaging overheating. Similar systems are still used; depending on the volume of the pour, the concrete mix used, and ambient air temperature, the cooling process may last for many months after the concrete is placed. Various methods also are used to pre-cool the concrete mix in mass concrete structures.

Another approach to mass concrete structures that minimizes cement's thermal by-product is the use of roller-compacted concrete, which uses a dry mix that has a much lower cooling requirement than conventional wet placement. It is deposited in thick layers as a semi-dry material then roller compacted into a dense, strong mass.

=== Surface finishes ===
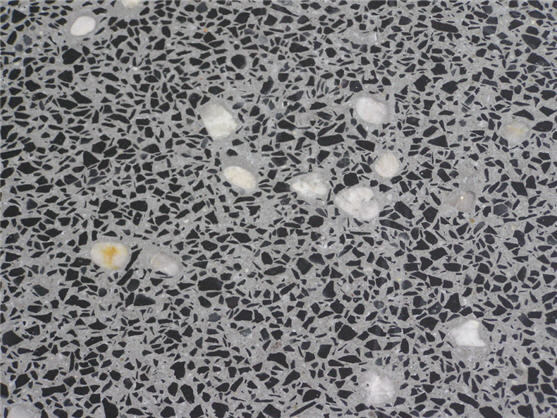
basalt polished concrete floor

Raw concrete surfaces tend to be porous and have a relatively uninteresting appearance. Many finishes can be applied to improve the appearance and preserve the surface against staining, water penetration, and freezing.

Examples of improved appearance include stamped concrete where the wet concrete has a pattern impressed on the surface, to give a paved, cobbled or brick-like effect, and may be accompanied with coloration. Another popular effect for flooring and table tops is polished concrete where the concrete is polished optically flat with diamond abrasives and sealed with polymers or other sealants.

Other finishes can be achieved with chiseling, or more conventional techniques such as painting or covering it with other materials.

The proper treatment of the surface of concrete, and therefore its characteristics, is an important stage in the construction and renovation of architectural structures.

=== Prestressed ===
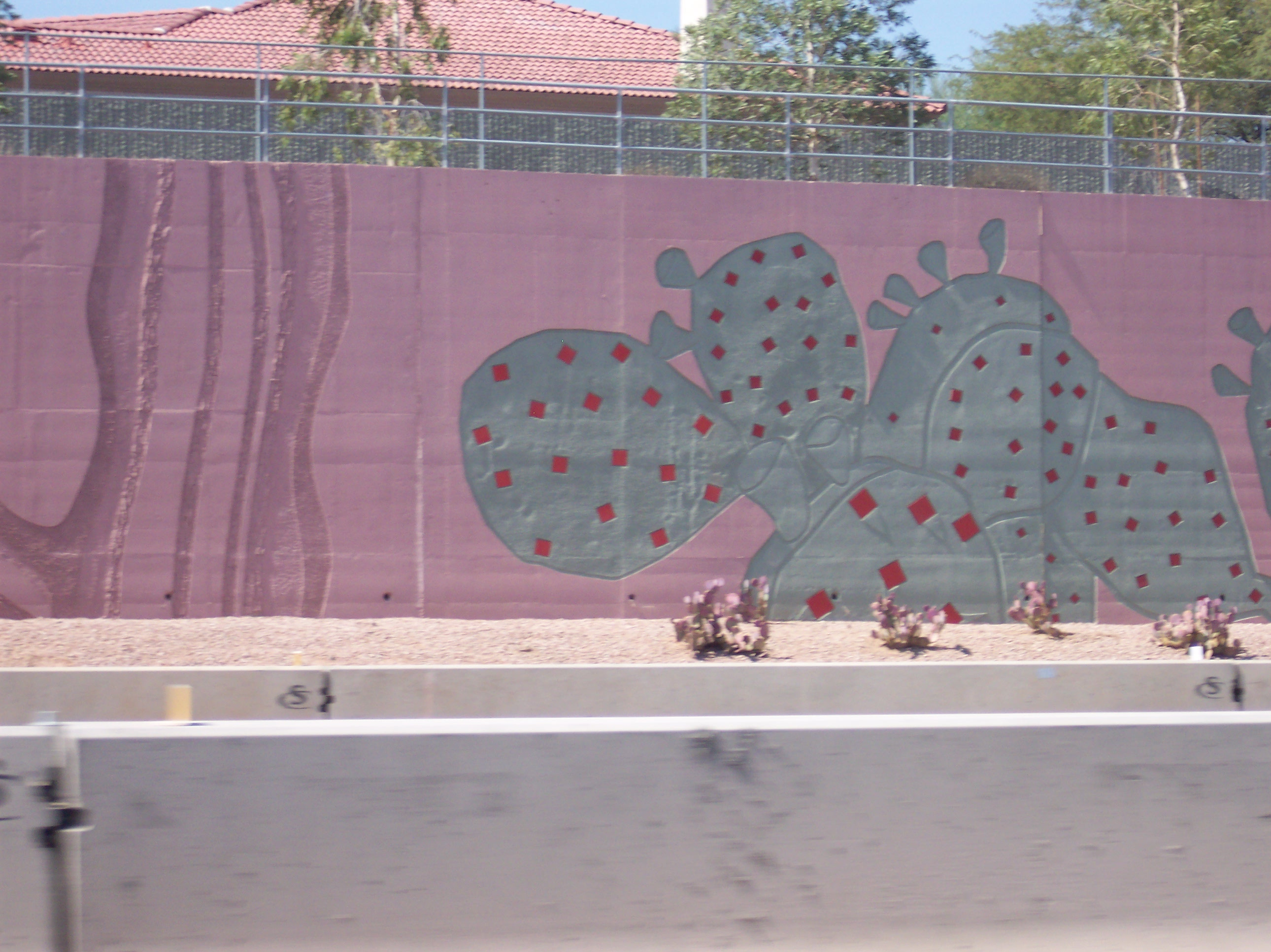
Stylized cacti decorate a sound/retaining wall in Scottsdale, Arizona

Prestressed concrete is a form of reinforced concrete that builds in compressive stresses during construction to oppose tensile stresses experienced in use. This can greatly reduce the weight of beams or slabs, by better distributing the stresses in the structure to make optimal use of the reinforcement. For example, a horizontal beam tends to sag. Prestressed reinforcement along the bottom of the beam counteracts this. In pre-tensioned concrete, the prestressing is achieved by using steel or polymer tendons or bars that are subjected to a tensile force before casting, or for post-tensioned concrete, after casting.

Two different systems are being used:

- Pretensioned concrete is almost always precast, and contains steel wires (tendons) that are held in tension while the concrete is placed and sets around them.
- Post-tensioned concrete has ducts through it. After the concrete has gained strength, tendons are pulled through the ducts and stressed. The ducts are then filled with grout. Bridges built in this way have experienced considerable corrosion of the tendons, so external post-tensioning may now be used in which the tendons run along the outer surface of the concrete.

More than 55,000 miles (89,000 km) of highways in the United States are paved with this material. Reinforced concrete, prestressed concrete and precast concrete are the most widely used types of concrete functional extensions in modern days. For more information see Brutalist architecture.

=== Placement ===
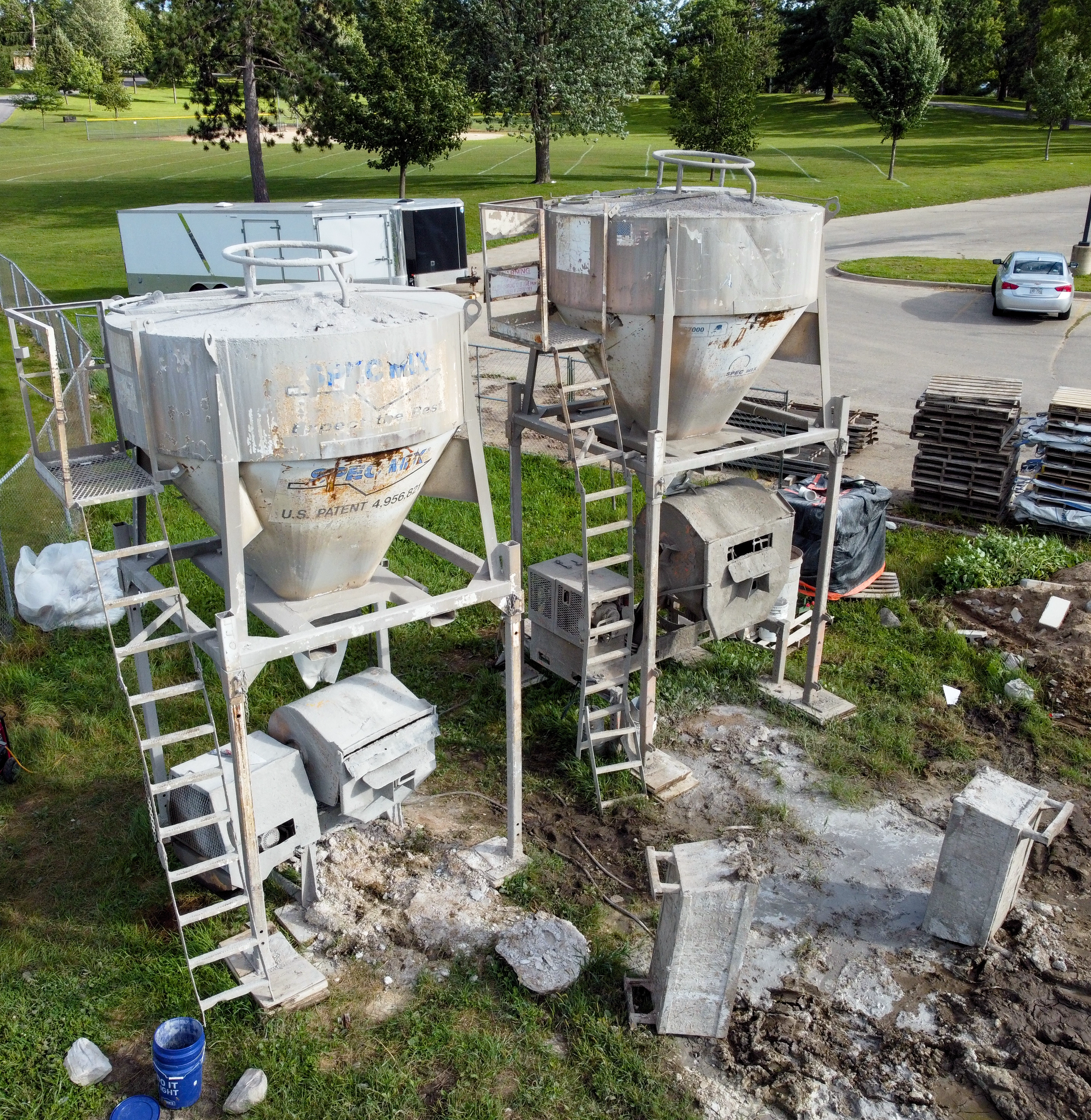
Concrete hoppers to store concrete from concrete mixing transport trucks

Once mixed, concrete is typically transported to the place where it is intended to become a structural item. Various methods of transportation and placement are used depending on the distances involved, quantity needed, and other details of application. Large amounts are often transported by truck, poured free under gravity or through a tremie, or pumped through a pipe. Smaller amounts may be carried in a skip (a metal container which can be tilted or opened to release the contents, usually transported by crane or hoist), or wheelbarrow, or carried in toggle bags for manual placement underwater.

==== Cold weather placement ====
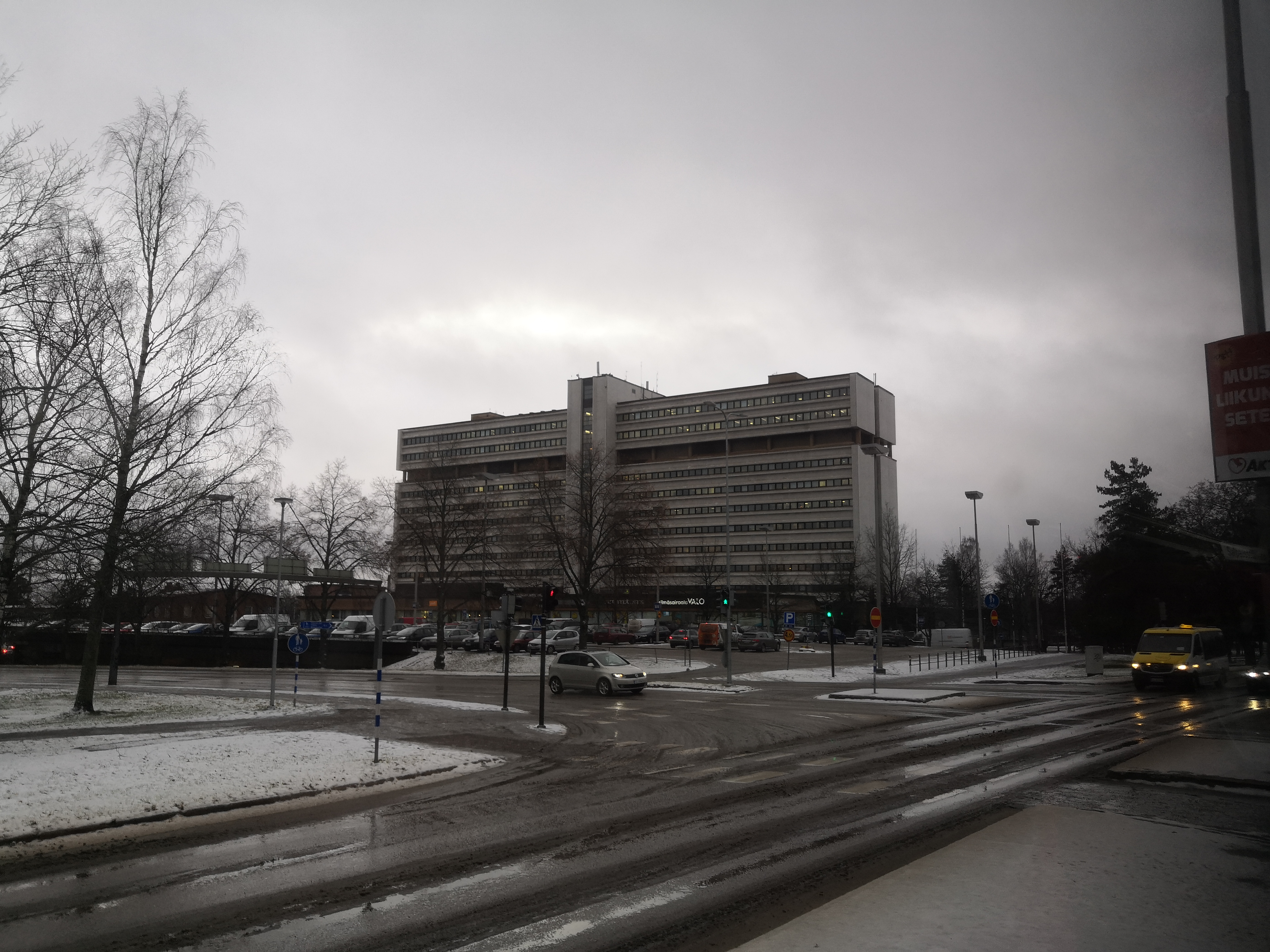
Pohjolatalo, an office building made of concrete in the city center of Kouvola in Kymenlaakso, Finland

Extreme weather conditions (extreme heat or cold; windy conditions, and humidity variations) can significantly alter the quality of concrete. Many precautions are observed in cold weather placement. Low temperatures significantly slow the chemical reactions involved in hydration of cement, thus affecting the strength development. Preventing freezing is the most important precaution, as formation of ice crystals can cause damage to the crystalline structure of the hydrated cement paste. If the surface of the concrete pour is insulated from the outside temperatures, the heat of hydration will prevent freezing.

The American Concrete Institute (ACI) definition of cold weather placement, ACI 306, is:

- A period when for more than three successive days the average daily air temperature drops below 40 °F (~ 4.5 °C), and
- Temperature stays below 50 °F (10 °C) for more than one-half of any 24-hour period.

In Canada, where temperatures tend to be much lower during the cold season, the following criteria are used by CSA A23.1:

- When the air temperature is ≤ 5 °C, and
- When there is a probability that the temperature may fall below 5 °C within 24 hours of placing the concrete.

The minimum strength before exposing concrete to extreme cold is 500 psi (3.4 MPa). CSA A 23.1 specified a compressive strength of 7.0 MPa to be considered safe for exposure to freezing.

==== Underwater placement ====
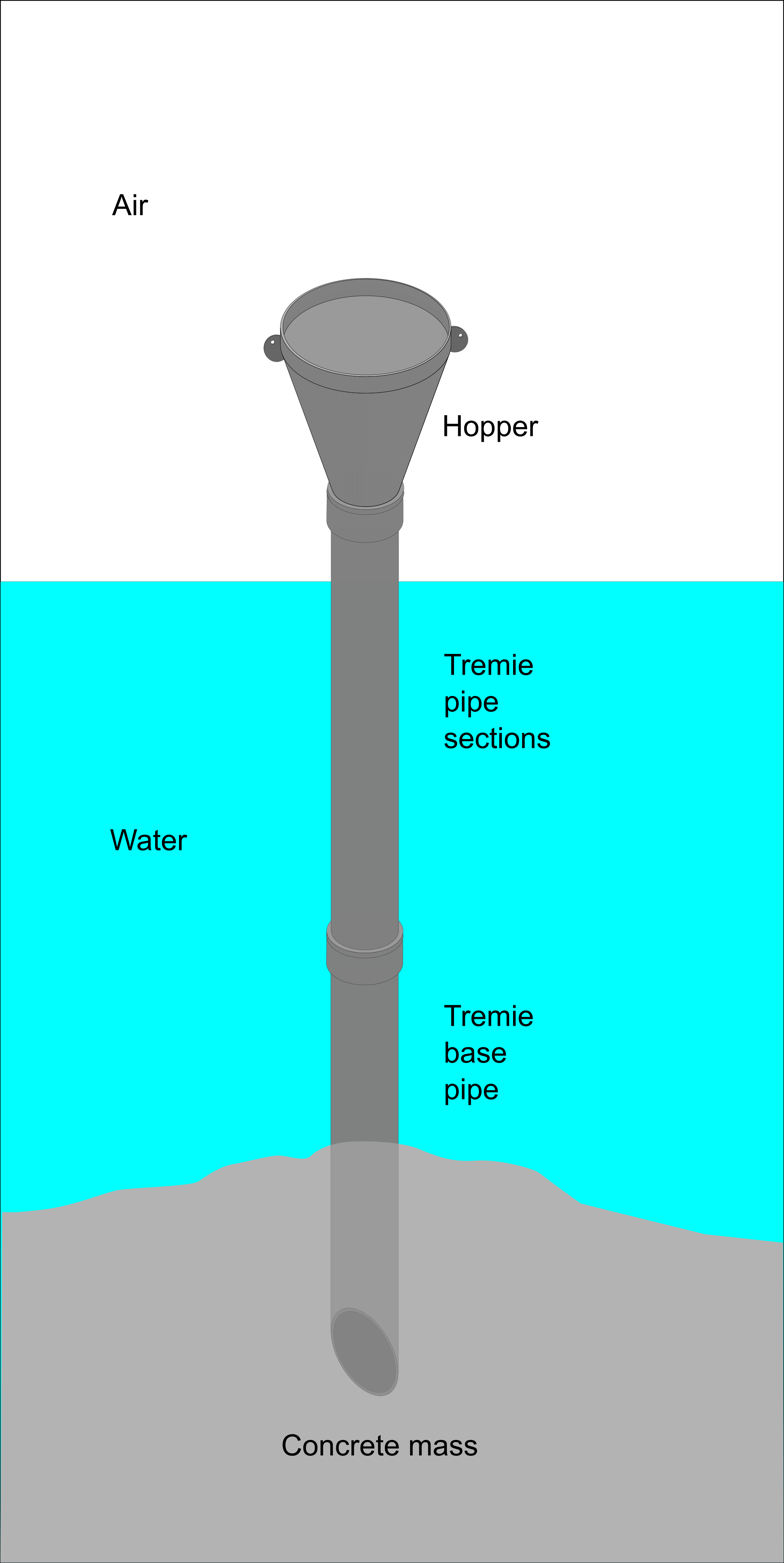
Assembled tremie placing concrete underwater

Concrete may be placed and cured underwater. Care must be taken in the placement method to prevent washing out the cement. Underwater placement methods include the tremie, pumping, skip placement, manual placement using toggle bags, and bagwork.

A tremie is a vertical, or near-vertical, pipe with a hopper at the top used to pour concrete underwater in a way that avoids washout of cement from the mix due to turbulent water contact with the concrete while it is flowing. This produces a more reliable strength of the product. The toggle bag method is generally used for placing small quantities and for repairs. Wet concrete is loaded into a reusable canvas bag and squeezed out at the required place by the diver. Care must be taken to avoid washout of the cement and fines.

Underwater bagwork is the manual placement by divers of woven cloth bags containing dry mix, followed by piercing the bags with steel rebar pins to tie the bags together after every two or three layers, and create a path for hydration to induce curing, which can typically take about 6 to 12 hours for initial hardening and full hardening by the next day. Bagwork concrete will generally reach full strength within 28 days. Each bag must be pierced by at least one, and preferably up to four pins. Bagwork is a simple and convenient method of underwater concrete placement which does not require pumps, plant, or formwork, and which can minimise environmental effects from dispersing cement in the water. Prefilled bags are available, which are sealed to prevent premature hydration if stored in suitable dry conditions. The bags may be biodegradable.

Grouted aggregate is an alternative method of forming a concrete mass underwater, where the forms are filled with coarse aggregate and the voids then completely filled from the bottom by displacing the water with pumped grout.

=== Roads ===
Concrete roads are more fuel efficient to drive on, more reflective and last significantly longer than other paving surfaces, yet have a much smaller market share than other paving solutions. Modern paving methods and design practices have changed the economics of concrete paving, so that a well-designed and placed concrete pavement will be less expensive on initial costs and significantly less expensive over the life cycle. Another major benefit is that pervious concrete can be used, which eliminates the need to place storm drains near the road and reduces the need for a slightly sloped roadway to help rainwater run off. No longer requiring discarding rainwater through use of drains also means that less electricity is needed (more pumping is otherwise needed in the water-distribution system), and no rainwater gets polluted as it no longer mixes with polluted water. Rather, it is immediately absorbed by the ground.

=== Tube forest ===
Cement molded into a forest of tubular structures can be 5.6 times more resistant to cracking/failure than standard concrete. The approach mimics mammalian cortical bone that features elliptical, hollow osteons suspended in an organic matrix, connected by relatively weak "cement lines". Cement lines provide a preferred in-plane crack path. This design fails via a "stepwise toughening mechanism". Cracks are contained within the tube, reducing spreading, by dissipating energy at each tube/step.

== Environment, health and safety ==
The manufacture and use of concrete produce a wide range of environmental, economic and social impacts.

=== Health and safety ===
Concrete dust emission from the use of a power tool.

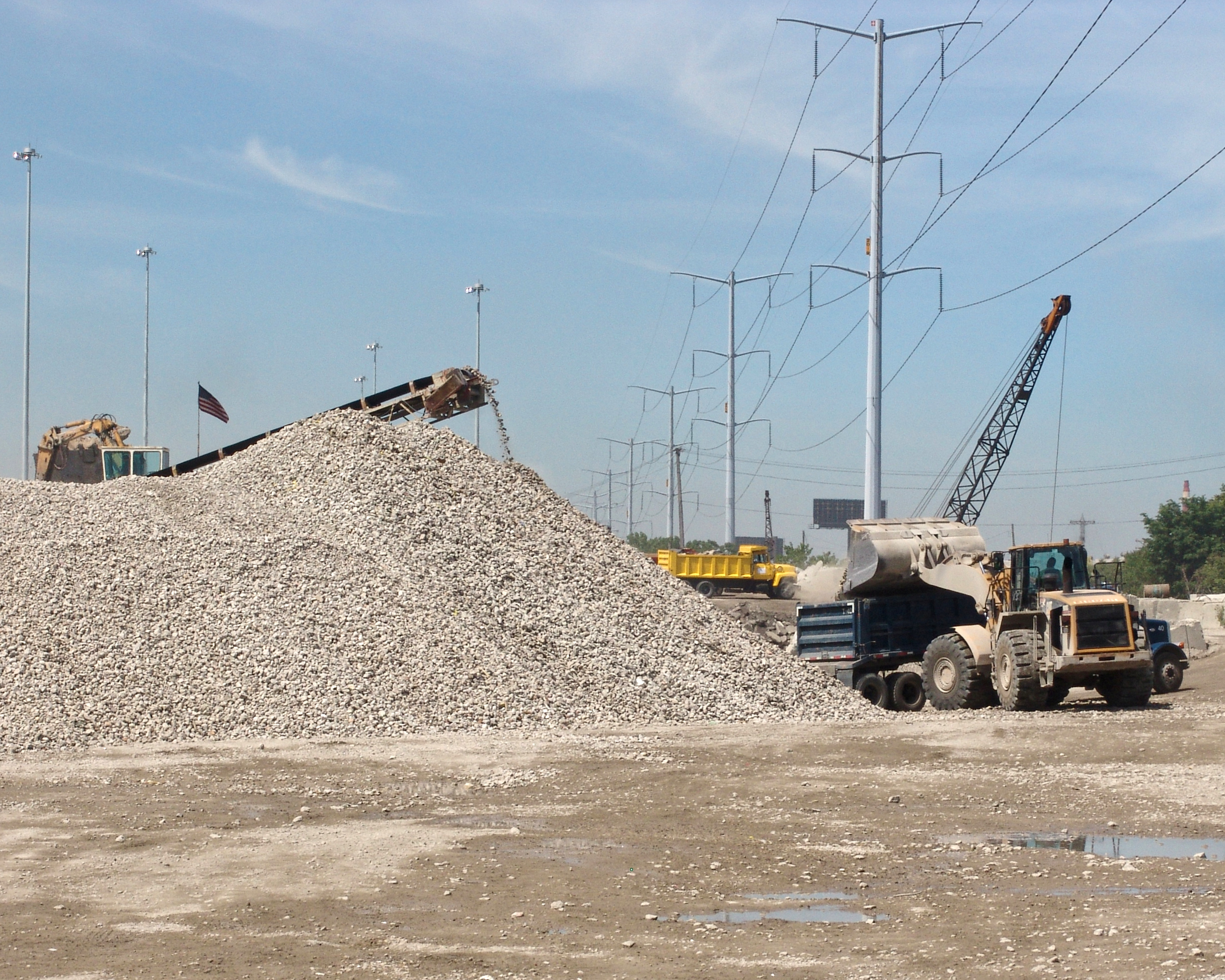
Recycled crushed concrete, to be reused as granular fill, is loaded into a semi-dump truck.

Grinding of concrete can produce hazardous dust. Exposure to cement dust can lead to issues such as silicosis, kidney disease, skin irritation and similar effects. The U.S. National Institute for Occupational Safety and Health recommends attaching local exhaust ventilation shrouds to electric concrete grinders to control the spread of this dust.

In addition, the Occupational Safety and Health Administration (OSHA) has placed more stringent regulations on companies whose workers regularly come into contact with silica dust. An updated silica rule, which OSHA put into effect on 23 September 2017 for construction companies, restricted the amount of breathable crystalline silica workers could legally come into contact with to 50 micrograms per cubic meter of air per 8-hour workday. That same rule went into effect 23 June 2018 for general industry, hydraulic fracturing and maritime. That deadline was extended to 23 June 2021 for engineering controls in the hydraulic fracturing industry.

Companies which fail to meet the tightened safety regulations can face financial charges and extensive penalties. The presence of some substances in concrete, including useful and unwanted additives, can cause health concerns due to toxicity and radioactivity. Fresh concrete (before curing is complete) is highly alkaline and must be handled with proper protective equipment.

=== Cement ===
A major component of concrete is cement, a fine powder used mainly to bind sand and coarser aggregates together in concrete. Although a variety of cement types exist, the most common is "Portland cement", which is produced by mixing clinker with smaller quantities of other additives such as gypsum and ground limestone. The production of clinker, the main constituent of cement, is responsible for the bulk of the sector's greenhouse gas emissions, including both energy intensity and process emissions.

The cement industry is one of the three primary producers of carbon dioxide, a major greenhouse gas – the other two being energy production and transportation industries. On average, every tonne of cement produced releases one tonne of CO_{2} into the atmosphere. Pioneer cement manufacturers have claimed to reach lower carbon intensities, with 590 kg of CO_{2}eq per tonne of cement produced. The emissions are due to combustion and calcination processes, which roughly account for 40% and 60% of the greenhouse gases, respectively. Considering that cement is only a fraction of the constituents of concrete, it is estimated that a tonne of concrete is responsible for emitting about 100–200 kg of CO_{2}. Every year more than 10 billion tonnes of concrete are used worldwide. In the coming years, large quantities of concrete will continue to be used, and the mitigation of CO_{2} emissions from the sector will be even more critical.

Concrete is used to create hard surfaces that contribute to surface runoff, which can cause heavy soil erosion, water pollution, and flooding, but conversely can be used to divert, dam, and control flooding. Concrete dust released by building demolition and natural disasters can be a major source of dangerous air pollution. Concrete is a contributor to the urban heat island effect, though less so than asphalt.

=== Climate change mitigation ===
Reducing the cement clinker content might have positive effects on the environmental life-cycle assessment of concrete. Some research work on reducing the cement clinker content in concrete has already been carried out. However, there exist different research strategies. Often replacement of some clinker with large amounts of slag or fly ash was investigated based on conventional concrete technology. This could lead to a waste of scarce raw materials such as slag and fly ash. The aim of other research activities is the efficient use of cement and reactive materials like slag and fly ash in concrete based on a modified mix design approach.

The embodied carbon of a precast concrete facade can be reduced by 50% when using the presented fiber-reinforced high-performance concrete in place of typical reinforced concrete cladding. Studies have been conducted about the commercialization of low-carbon concretes. Life cycle assessment (LCA) of low-carbon concrete was investigated according to the ground granulated blast-furnace slag (GGBS) and fly ash (FA) replacement ratios. Global warming potential (GWP) of GGBS decreased by 1.1 kg CO_{2} eq/m^{3}, while FA decreased by 17.3 kg CO_{2} eq/m^{3} when the mineral admixture replacement ratio was increased by 10%. This study also compared the compressive strength properties of binary blended low-carbon concrete according to the replacement ratios, and the applicable range of mixing proportions was derived.

=== Climate change adaptation ===
High-performance building materials will be particularly important for enhancing resilience, including for flood defenses and critical-infrastructure protection. Risks to infrastructure and cities posed by extreme weather events are especially serious for those places exposed to flood and hurricane damage, but also where residents need protection from extreme summer temperatures. Traditional concrete can come under strain when exposed to humidity and higher concentrations of atmospheric CO_{2}. While concrete is likely to remain important in applications where the environment is challenging, novel, smarter and more adaptable materials are also needed.

=== End-of-life: degradation and waste ===
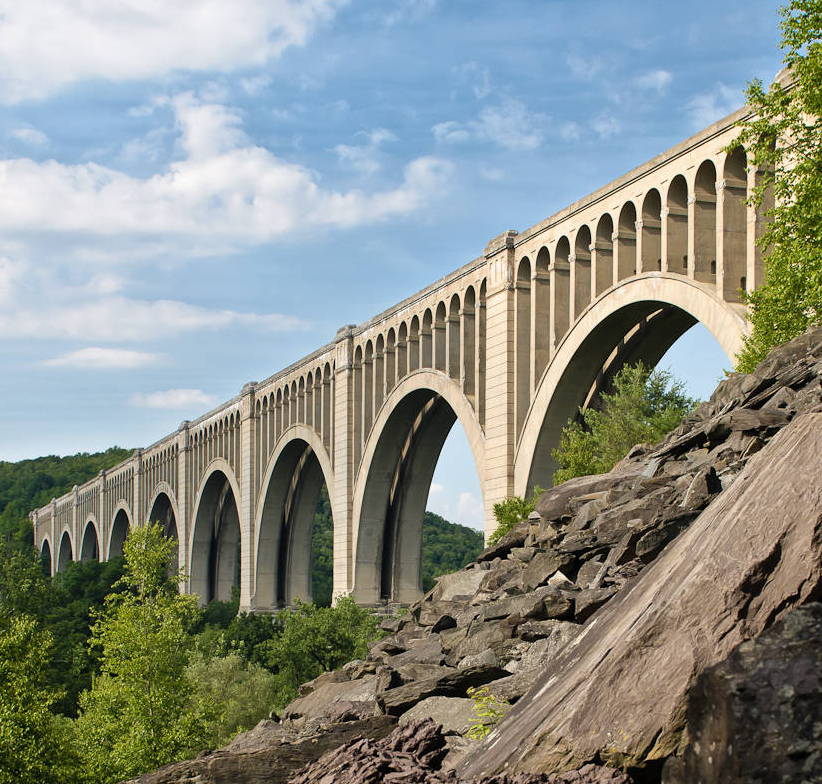
The Tunkhannock Viaduct in northeastern Pennsylvania opened in 1915 and is still in regular use today

Concrete degradation has many different causes. Concrete is mostly damaged by the corrosion of reinforcement bars, the carbonatation of hardened cement paste or chloride attack under wet conditions. Chemical damage is caused by the formation of expansive products produced by chemical reactions (from carbonatation, chlorides, sulfates and distillate water), by aggressive chemical species present in groundwater and seawater (chlorides, sulfates, magnesium ions), or by microorganisms (bacteria, fungi...) Other damaging processes can also involve calcium leaching by water infiltration, physical phenomena initiating cracks formation and propagation, fire or radiant heat, aggregate expansion, sea water effects, leaching, and erosion by fast-flowing water.

=== Recycling ===
Concrete recycling is the use of rubble from demolished concrete structures. Recycling is cheaper and more ecological than trucking rubble to a landfill. Crushed rubble can be used for road gravel, revetments, retaining walls, landscaping gravel, or raw material for new concrete. Large pieces can be used as bricks or slabs, or incorporated with new concrete into structures, a material called urbanite.

There have been concerns about the recycling of painted concrete due to possible lead content. Studies have indicated that recycled concrete exhibits lower strength and durability compared to concrete produced using natural aggregates. This deficiency can be addressed by incorporating supplementary materials such as fly ash into the mixture.

Recygenie has built a 220-unit housing complex out of 100% recycled concrete, strengthening the concrete by adding recycled sand, steel slag, and other byproducts.

== World records ==
The world record for the largest concrete pour in a single project is the Three Gorges Dam in Hubei Province, China by the Three Gorges Corporation. The amount of concrete used in the construction of the dam is estimated at 16 million cubic meters over 17 years. The previous record was 12.3 million cubic meters held by the Itaipu hydropower station in Brazil.

The world record for concrete pumping was set on 7 August 2009 during the construction of the Parbati Hydroelectric Project, near the village of Suind, Himachal Pradesh, India, when the concrete mix was pumped through a vertical height of 715 m (2,346 ft).

The Polavaram dam works in Andhra Pradesh on 6 January 2019 entered the Guinness World Records by pouring 32,100 cubic metres of concrete in 24 hours. The world record for the largest continuously poured concrete raft was achieved in August 2007 in Abu Dhabi by contracting firm Al Habtoor-CCC Joint Venture and the concrete supplier is Unibeton Ready Mix. The pour (a part of the foundation for the Abu Dhabi's Landmark Tower) was 16,000 cubic meters of concrete poured within a two-day period. The previous record, 13,200 cubic meters poured in 54 hours despite a severe tropical storm requiring the site to be covered with tarpaulins to allow work to continue, was achieved in 1992 by joint Japanese and South Korean consortiums Hazama Corporation and the Samsung C&T Corporation for the construction of the Petronas Towers in Kuala Lumpur, Malaysia.

The world record for largest continuously poured concrete floor was completed on 8 November 1997, in Louisville, Kentucky by design-build firm EXXCEL Project Management. The monolithic placement consisted of 225,000 square feet (20,900 m^{2}) of concrete placed in 30 hours, finished to a flatness tolerance of F_{F} 54.60 and a levelness tolerance of F_{L} 43.83. This surpassed the previous record by 50% in total volume and 7.5% in total area.

The record for the largest continuously placed underwater concrete pour was completed 18 October 2010, in New Orleans, Louisiana by contractor C. J. Mahan Construction Company, LLC of Grove City, Ohio. The placement consisted of 10,251 cubic yards of concrete placed in 58.5 hours using two concrete pumps and two dedicated concrete batch plants. Upon curing, this placement allows the 50,180-square-foot (4,662 m^{2}) cofferdam to be dewatered approximately 26 feet (7.9 m) below sea level to allow the construction of the Inner Harbor Navigation Canal Sill & Monolith Project to be completed in the dry.

== Art ==
Concrete is used as an artistic medium. Its appearance is also imitated in other media: for example Congolese artist Sardoine Mia creates canvases that look like concrete surfaces.

== See also ==
- Concrete leveling – Process to level concrete by levelling its underlying foundation
- Concrete mixer – Device that combines cement, aggregate, and water to form concrete
- Concrete masonry unit – Standard-sized block used in construction
- Concrete plant – Equipment that combines various ingredients to form concrete
- Eurocode 2: Design of concrete structures
- Heavy metals – Term used for certain metallic elements
- Hempcrete – Biocomposite material used for construction and insulation
- The History of Concrete—2026 documentary film
- List of tools for concrete and masonry
- Particulates – Microscopic solid or liquid matter suspended in the Earth's atmosphere
- Schmidt hammer – Type of measuring instrument
- Syncrete – Synthetic form of concrete
- Thermal integrity profiling – Method used to test concrete
