= Accelerated curing =

Accelerated curing is any method by which high early age strength is achieved in concrete. These techniques are especially useful in the prefabrication industry, wherein high early age strength enables the removal of the formwork within 24 hours, thereby reducing the cycle time, resulting in cost-saving benefits. The most commonly adopted curing techniques are steam curing at atmospheric pressure, warm water curing, boiling water curing and autoclaving.

A typical curing cycle involves a preheating stage, known as the "delay period" ranging from 2 to 5 hours; heating at the rate of 22 °C/hour or 44 °C/hour until a maximum temperature of 50−82 °C has been achieved; then maintaining at the maximum temperature, and finally the cooling period. The whole cycle should preferably not exceed 18 hours.

== Mechanism ==
At heightened temperatures, the hydration process moves more rapidly and the formation of the Calcium Silicate Hydrate crystals is more rapid. The formation of the gel and colloid is more rapid and the rate of diffusion of the gel is also higher. However, the reaction being more rapid leaves lesser time for the hydration products to arrange suitably, hence the later age strength or the final compressive strength attained is lower in comparison to normally cured concrete. This has been termed as the crossover effect.

The optimum temperature has been found to be between 65 and 70 °C, beyond which the losses in later age strength have been found to be considerably higher.

== Delay period ==
Accelerated curing techniques invariably involve high temperatures. This may induce thermal stresses in the concrete. Further, the water in the pores starts to exert pressure at higher temperatures. The combined effect of the pore pressure and thermal stresses causes a tensile stress within the body of the concrete. If the accelerated curing process is begun immediately after the concrete has been poured, then the concrete will not be able to withstand the tensile stresses as it requires time to gain some strength. Moreover, these microcracks formed may then lead to the delayed formation of ettringite, which is formed by the transformation of metastable monosulfate. Delayed ettringite formation (DEF) induces expansion in the concrete thereby weakening it. DEF is promoted by the formation of the cracks which enables the easy entry of water. Therefore, a delay period is allowed to elapse before the commencement of the curing process to allow the concrete to gain a certain minimum tensile strength. The setting time of the concrete is an important criterion to determine the delay period. Generally, the delay period is equal to the initial setting time which has been found to give satisfactory results. Lesser delay periods result in compressive strength losses.

== Excessive temperatures ==
Excessive temperatures cause a drop in the Compressive strength due to the "crossover" effect. Higher temperatures would reduce the cycle time and therefore improve the economy of the manufacturing process, however, the compressive strength obtained would also be lower. Therefore, it is a trade-off between cost saving benefits and the loss in compressive strength. Depending on the type of project and economic considerations, either the cycle time is designed to suit the concrete mix or vice versa.

== Role of pozzolanic material ==
Pozzolona increases the later age strength of concrete as it reacts with calcium hydroxide and turns it into calcium-silicate-hydrates (C-S-H). However Portland pozzolona cements have higher activation energy and therefore, their rate of hydration is lower as compared to ordinary Portland cement (OPC). This results in lower early age strength as compared to OPC. Accelerated curing techniques radically help to increase the rate of strength gain. Halit et al. showed that steam curing improved the 1 day compressive strength values of high volume fly ash concrete mixtures (40%, 50% and 60% fly ash by replacement) from 10MPa to about 20MPa which is sufficient to enable the removal of formwork and greatly aids the precast concrete industry.
