= Rastra =

Rastra is a registered tradename for a particular insulating concrete form (ICF) construction system, Rastra created the name Insulating COMPOUND Concrete Form (ICCF), used to make walls for buildings. It is one of the earliest such products, first patented in 1965 in Austria. Rastra is in production since 1972, and is composed of concrete and Thastyron. Thastyron is a mixture of plastic foam and cementitious binder that is composed of eighty-five percent recycled post consumer polystyrene waste that is molded into blocks and panels.

== Production ==
Rastra is sustainable in its production because no energy is used in the curing process, and only one to three kilowatt hour (kWh) are required to make each >10sqft block. After the blocks are trimmed to exact size, the remaining debris is recycled to create new blocks. No byproducts are released in the production process that are considered a burden to the environment.

== Building ==
Rastra blocks come in different sizes, and can be easily cut with woodworking tools to form the desired shape. These blocks are commonly attached together with clamps or glue to form a grid-like system inside. Rebar is then run through the grid, which is then filled with concrete.

== History ==
Polystyrene concrete was invented in 1960. BASF, a German chemical conglomerate, originally created this product, but found no successful applications. An Austrian-Swiss-based company modified the product and created what is known as Rastra.

== Fire rating ==
As a thermal barrier, Rastra has a four-hour fire rating with no flame spread and no smoke development. A five-hour fire endurance test of a ten-inch-thick wall with temperatures exceeding two thousand degrees Fahrenheit on the face of the wall showed that the wall did not conduct heat. This lowers the risk of health hazards during a fire and also makes building repairs easier afterwards.

== Physical properties ==
Thastyron has a compressive strength of 56 pound-force per square inch (psi) and a tensile strength of 43 psi. Rastra has a low toxicity level. Rastra is highly frost, fungus, and mildew-resistant. The sound insulation is greater than 50 decibel(dB).

== Insulation ==
As a heat insulation, Rastra keeps a room at a constant temperature and evens out temperature changes, both of which can lower energy use. It also has a low heat penetration depth, meaning the wall surface keeps a constant temperature.
