= Syncrete =

Synthetic form of concrete

Syncrete or Syn-Crete was an experimental synthetic concrete intended for road patching and repairs, created by blending an artificial polymer with concrete. According to its manufacturer, Hodson Chemical Construction Corp., Syncrete had been used successfully on small and large concrete repair projects throughout the West and Hawaii. However, most notoriously, in 1989 it was used by the Utah Department of Transportation (UDOT) in an unprecedented large-scale test, to pave a section of Interstate 15 between 5900 South and 3300 South in Salt Lake City, Utah.

Instead of a total reconstruction, which would have required closing sections of I-15 for up to a year, the "salt resistant" Syncrete was applied as 3/4"-thick overlay on top of the existing road surface.

Syncrete was promoted by Hodson consulting engineers as a quicker, cheaper, longer-lasting alternative to conventional concrete, and UDOT agreed to take on the risk for the experimental project. However, the freeway surface began crumbling shortly after the project's completion, and chunks of the resulting debris began causing vehicle damage. Less than a year later, UDOT tore out the syncrete. The original construction costs were $1.5 million, and tearing up the Syncrete cost approximately $795,000, bringing the total cost for the failed project to an estimated $2.7 million.

SynCrete as of 2015 is now a registered trade mark in Australia of OmniCrete Pty Ltd and is a new product line completely unassociated with the above materials, developers or contractors.
