= Thermal integrity profiling =

Method used to test concrete

Thermal Integrity Profiling (TIP) is a non-destructive testing method used to evaluate the integrity of concrete foundations. It is standardized by ASTM D7949 - Standard Test Methods for Thermal Integrity Profiling of Concrete Deep Foundations.

The testing method was first developed in the mid 1990s at the University of South Florida. It relates the heat generated by curing of cement to the integrity and quality of drilled shafts, augered cast in place (ACIP) piles and other concrete foundations. In general, a shortage of competent concrete (necks or inclusions) is registered by relative cool regions; the presence of extra concrete (over-pour bulging into soft soil strata) is registered by relative warm regions.

Concrete temperatures along the length of the foundation element are sampled throughout the concrete hydration process. TIP analysis is performed at the point of peak temperature, generally 18 to 24hrs post-concreting. Measurements are available relatively soon after pouring (6 to 72 hours), generally before other integrity testing methods such as cross hole sonic logging and low strain integrity testing can be performed.

TIP can be performed using a probe lowered down standard access tubes or by installing embedded thermal wires along the length of the reinforcement cage. Four thermal wires are commonly installed along the steel cage, each 90 degrees from one another, forming a north-east-south-west configuration. If records at a certain depth show regions with cooler temperatures (when compared to the average temperature at that depth), a concrete deficiency or defect may be present. An average temperature at a certain depth that is significantly lower than the average temperatures at other depths may also be indication of a potential problem. It is also possible to estimate the effective area of the foundation, and to assess if the reinforcing cage is properly aligned and centered.
