= Fondu fyre =

Heat and erosion resistant concrete used in aerospace applications

Fondu Fyre, sometimes called Fondue Fyre, is a refractory concrete developed for specialist application. Fondu Fyre is a heat and erosion resistant concrete developed during the Apollo space program. It was developed to withstand the supersonic plume of a rocket engine during launch and hot-fire tests.

Allied Mineral Products based in Ohio holds the registered trademark on the name Fondu Fyre.

== Uses ==
The concrete is used in 2 different mixtures called WA-1 and XB-1. The XB-1 is used as a more fire and erosion resistant layer for covering WA-1 in areas which are directly exposed to the exhaust flame of a rocket engine. The concrete is used on the launch pads of the Kennedy Space Center on the flame deflectors.

== Damage ==
Fondue Fyre was used to repair the damage done on May 31, 2008 to launchpad 39A during the launch of the Space Shuttle Discovery on mission STS-124. After subsequent launch of Space Shuttle Atlantis for mission STS-125 on May 11, 2009 a 25 square metre section of the Fondue Fyre on pad 39A was found to have been damaged by exhaust from the Solid Rocket Booster.
