= C10H8O3S =

The molecular formula C_{10}H_{8}O_{3}S (molar mass: 208.234 g/mol, exact mass: 208.0194 u) may refer to:

- Naphthalenesulfonic acid
  - Naphthalene-1-sulfonic acid
  - Naphthalene-2-sulfonic acid
- Jedi2
