= Extracellular polymeric substance =

Gluey polymers secreted by microorganisms to form biofilms

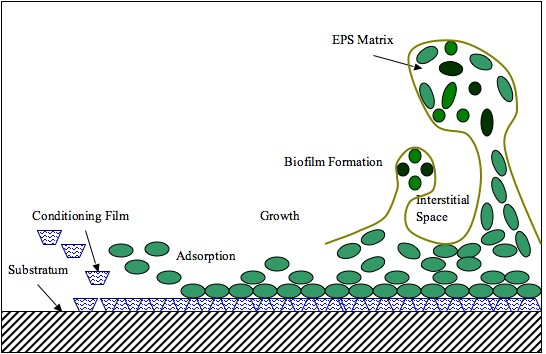
Extracellular polymeric substance matrix formation in a biofilm

Extracellular polymeric substances (EPS) are natural polymers of high molecular weight secreted by microorganisms into their environment. EPS establish the functional and structural integrity of biofilms, and are considered the fundamental component that determines the physicochemical properties of a biofilm. EPS in the matrix of biofilms provides compositional support and protection of microbial communities from the harsh environments. Components of EPS can be of different classes of polysaccharides, lipids, nucleic acids, proteins, lipopolysaccharides, and minerals.

== Components ==
EPS are mostly composed of polysaccharides (exopolysaccharides) and proteins, but include other macromolecules such as DNA, lipids and humic substances. EPS are the construction material of bacterial settlements and either remain attached to the cell's outer surface, or are secreted into its growth medium. These compounds are important in biofilm formation and cells' attachment to surfaces. EPS constitute 50% to 90% of a biofilm's total organic matter.

=== Exopolysaccharides ===
Exopolysaccharides (also sometimes abbreviated EPS; EPS sugars thereafter) are the sugar-based parts of EPS. Microorganisms synthesize a wide spectrum of multifunctional polysaccharides including intracellular polysaccharides, structural polysaccharides and extracellular polysaccharides or exopolysaccharides. Exopolysaccharides generally consist of monosaccharides and some non-carbohydrate substituents (such as acetate, pyruvate, succinate, and phosphate).

Exopolysaccharides are secreted from microorganisms including microalgae into the surrounding environment during their growth or propagation. They can either be loosely attached to the cell wall or excreted into the environment. Many microalgae, especially a variety of red algae and cyanobacteria, are producers of structurally diverse exopolysaccharides. Additionally, exopolysaccharides are involved in cell-to-cell interactions, adhesion, and biofilm formation.

Exopolysaccharides are widely used in the food industry as thickeners and gelling additives, which improve food quality and texture. Currently, exopolysaccharides have received much attention for their antibacterial, anti-oxidative, and anticancer properties, which lead to the development of promising pharmaceutical candidates. Since exopolysaccharides are released into the culture medium, they can be easily recovered and purified. Different strategies used for the economical extraction and other downstream processing were discussed in a chapter of the referenced book.

The minerals, results of biomineralization processes regulated by the environment or bacteria, are also essential components of the exopolysaccharides. They provide structural integrity to biofilm matrix and act as a scaffold to protect bacterial cells from shear forces and antimicrobial chemicals. The minerals in EPS were found to contribute to morphogenesis of bacteria and the structural integrity of the matrix. For example, in Bacillus subtilis, Mycobacterium smegmatis, and Pseudomonas aeruginosa biofilms, calcite (CaCO_{3}) contributes to the integrity of the matrix. The minerals also associate with medical conditions. In the biofilms of Proteus mirabilis, Proteus vulgaris, and Providencia rettgeri, the minerals calcium and magnesium cause catheter encrustation.

==== Constituents ====
A 2013 review described sulfated polysaccharides synthesized by 120 marine microalgae, most of which are EPS. These heteropolymers consist mainly of galactose, glucose, and xylose in different proportions except those from Gyrodinium impudicum, which are homopolymers. Most EPS from cyanobacteria are also complex anionic heteropolymers containing six to ten different monosaccharides, one or more uronic acids, and various functional substituents such as methyl, acetate, pyruvate, sulfate groups, and proteins. For instance, the EPS from Arthrospira platensis are heteropolymer with protein (55%) moieties and a complex polysaccharide composition, containing seven neutral sugars: glucose, rhamnose, fructose, galactose, xylose, arabinose, and mannose, as well as two uronic acids, galacturonic acid and glucuronic acid.

Dunaliella salina is a unicellular green alga of outstanding halotolerance. Salt stress induces the secretion of extracellular polymeric substances from D. salina. It is speculated that the release of complex mixtures of macromolecular polyelectrolytes with high polysaccharide content contributes to the survival strategy of D. salina in varying salt concentrations. Four monosaccharides (galactose, glucose, xylose, and fructose) were detected in the hydrolysate of EPS from D. salina under salt stress. In contrast, the water-soluble polysaccharides released by Chlorella pyrenoidosa contain galactose, arabinose, mannose, ribose, xylose, fucose, and rhamnose; their release depends on the cell photosynthetic activity and reproductive state.

==== Strategies for EPS yield-increase ====
Although the EPS from microalgae have many potential applications, their low yield is one of the major limitations for scale-up in industry. The type and amount of EPS obtained from a certain microalgae-culture depends on several factors, such as culture system design, nutritional and culture conditions, as well as the recovery and purification process. Therefore, the configuration and optimization of production systems are critical for the further development of applications.

Examples of successful increase of EPS yield include

- an optimized medium (for Chlamydomonas reinhardtii),
- an examination of the nutritional conditions including higher salinity and nitrogen concentration (for Botryococcus braunii),
- the addition of sulfate and magnesium salts in the culture medium (P. cruentum),
- a co-culturing of Chlorella and Spirulina with the Basidiomycete Trametes versicolor,
- and a novel mutagenesis tool (atmospheric and room temperature plasma, ARTP), leading to an increase of EPS production of up to 34% (volumetric yield of 1.02 g/L).

It was suggested that co-cultures of microalgae and other microorganisms can be used more universally as a technology to increase the production of EPS, since microorganisms may respond to the interaction partners by secreting EPS as a strategy during unfavorable conditions.

==== List of Exopolysaccharides (EPS) ====
Succinoglycan from Sinorhizobium meliloti

- acetan (Acetobacter xylinum)
- alginate (Azotobacter vinelandii, Pseudomonas spp.)
- cellulose (Acetobacter xylinum)
- chitosan (Mucorales spp.)
- curdlan (Alcaligenes faecalis var. myxogenes)
- cyclosophorans (Agrobacterium spp., Rhizobium spp. and Xanthomonas spp.)
- dextran (Leuconostoc mesenteroides, Leuconostoc dextranicum and Lactobacillus hilgardii)
- emulsan (Acinetobacter calcoaceticus)
- galactoglucopolysaccharides (Achromobacter spp., Agrobacterium radiobacter, Pseudomonas marginalis, Rhizobium spp. and Zooglea spp.)
- galactosaminogalactan (Aspergillus spp.)
- gellan (Aureomonas elodea and Sphingomonas paucimobilis)
- glucuronan (Sinorhizobium meliloti)
- N-acetylglucosamine (Staphylococcus epidermidis)
- N-acetyl-heparosan (Escherichia coli)
- hyaluronic acid (Streptococcus equi)
- indican (Beijerinckia indica)
- kefiran (Lactobacillus hilgardii)
- lentinan (Lentinus elodes)
- levan (Alcaligenes viscosus, Zymomonas mobilis, Bacillus subtilis)
- pullulan (Aureobasidium pullulans)
- scleroglucan (Sclerotium rolfsii, Sclerotium delfinii and Sclerotium glucanicum)
- schizophyllan (Schizophyllum commune)
- stewartan (Pantoea stewartii subsp. stewartii)
- succinoglycan (Alcaligenes faecalis var. myxogenes, Sinorhizobium meliloti)
- xanthan (Xanthomonas campestris)
- welan (Alcaligenes spp.)

=== Exoenzymes ===
Exoenzymes are enzymes secreted by microorganisms, such as bacteria and fungi, to function outside their cells. These enzymes are crucial for breaking down large molecules in the environment into smaller ones that the microorganisms can absorb (transport into their cells) and use for growth and energy.

Several studies have demonstrated that the activity of extracellular enzymes in aquatic microbial ecology is of algal origin. These exoenzymes released from microalgae include alkaline phosphatases, chitinases, β-d-glucosidases, proteases etc. and can influence the growth of microorganisms, chemical signaling, and biogeochemical cycling in ecosystems. The study of these exoenzymes may help to optimize the nutrient supplement strategy in aquaculture. Nevertheless, only a few of the enzymes were isolated and purified. Selected prominent enzyme classes are highlighted in the cited literature.

==== Extracellular proteases ====
The green microalgae Chlamydomonas coccoides and Dunaliella sp. and chlorella sphaerkii (a unicellular marine chlorophyte) were found to produce extracellular proteases. The diatom Chaetoceros didymus releases substantial amounts of proteases into the medium, this production is induced by the presence of the lytic bacterium Kordia algicida and is connected to the resistance of this alga against the effects of this bacterium. Some proteases are of functional importance in viral life cycles, thus being attractive targets for drug development.

==== Phycoerythrin-like proteins ====
Phycobiliproteins are water soluble light-capturing proteins, produced by cyanobacteria, and several algae. These pigments have been explored as fluorescent tags, food coloring agents, cosmetics, and immunological diagnostic agents. Most of these pigments are synthesized and accumulated intracellularly. As an exception, the cyanobacteria Oscillatoria and Scytonema sp. release an extracellular phycoerythrin-like 250 kDa protein. This pigment inhibits the growth of the green algae Chlorella fusca and Chlamydomonas and can be potentially used as an algicide.

==== Extracellular phenoloxidases ====
Phenols are an important group of ecotoxins due to their toxicity and persistence. Many microorganisms can degrade aromatic pollutants and use them as a source of energy, and the ability of microalgae to degrade a multitude of aromatic compounds including phenolic compounds is increasingly recognized. Some microalgae including Chlamydomonas sp., Chlorella sp., Scenedesmus sp. and Anabaena sp. are able to degrade various phenols such as pentachlorophenol, p-nitrophenol, and naphthalenesulfonic acids. Though the metabolic degradation pathways are not fully understood, enzymes including phenoloxidase laccase (EC 1.10.3.2) and laccase-like enzymes are involved in the oxidation of aromatic substrates. These exoenzymes can be potentially applied in the environmental degradation of phenolic pollutants.

==== Protease inhibitors ====
Protease inhibitors are a class of compounds that inhibit the activity of proteases (enzymes responsible for cleaving peptide bonds in proteins). These inhibitors are crucial in various biological processes and therapeutic applications, as proteases play key roles in numerous physiological functions, including digestion, immune response, blood coagulation, and cell signaling.

An extracellular cysteine protease inhibitor, ECPI-2, was purified from the culture medium of Chlorella sp. The inhibitor had an inhibitory effect against the proteolytic activity of papain, ficin, and chymopapain. ECPI-2 contains 33.6% carbohydrate residues that may be responsible for the stability of the enzyme under neutral or acidic conditions. These inhibitor proteins from Chlorella may be synthesized to protect cells from attacks by e.g., viruses or herbivores. Compared to organic compounds, peptide drugs are of relatively low toxicity to the human body. The development of peptide inhibitors as drugs is thus an attractive research topic in current medicinal chemistry. Protease inhibitors are attractive agents in the treatment of specific diseases; for instance, elastase is of critical importance in diseases like lung emphysema, which motivates further investigation on microalgal protease inhibitors as valuable lead-structures in pharmaceutical development.

== Biofilm ==
=== Biofilm formation ===
The first step in the formation of biofilms is adhesion. The initial bacterial adhesion to surfaces involves the adhesin–receptor interactions. Certain polysaccharides, lipids and proteins in the matrix function as the adhesive agents. EPS also promotes cell–cell cohesion (including interspecies recognition) to facilitate microbial aggregation and biofilm formation. In general, the EPS-based matrix mediates biofilm assembly as follows. First, the EPS formation takes place at the site of adhesion, it will be either produced on bacterial surfaces or secreted on the surface of attachment, and form an initial polymeric matrix promoting microbial colonization and cell clustering. Next, continuous production of EPS further expands the matrix in 3 dimensions while forming a core of bacterial cells. The bacterial core provides a supporting framework, and facilitates the development of 3D clusters and aggregation of microcolonies. Studies on P. aeruginosa, B. subtilis, V. cholerae, and S. mutans suggested that the transition from initial cell clustering to microcolony appears to be conserved among different biofilm-forming model organisms. As an example, S. mutans produces an exoenzyme, called glucosyltransferase (Gtf), which synthesizes glucans in situ using host diet sugars as substrates. Gtfs even bind to the bacteria that do not synthesize Gtfs, and therefore, facilitate interspecies and interkingdom coadhesion.

=== Significance in biofilms ===
Afterwards, as biofilm becomes established, EPS provides physical stability and resistance to mechanical removal, antimicrobials, and host immunity. Exopolysaccharides and environmental DNA (eDNA) contribute to viscoelasticity of mature biofilms so that detachment of biofilm from the substratum will be challenging even under sustained fluid shear stress or high mechanical pressure. In addition to mechanical resistance, EPS also promotes protection against antimicrobials and enhanced drug tolerance. Antimicrobials cannot diffuse through the EPS barrier, resulting in limited drug access into the deeper layers of the biofilm. Moreover, positively charged agents will bind to negatively charged EPS contributing to the antimicrobial tolerance of biofilms, and enabling inactivation or degradation of antimicrobials by enzymes present in biofilm matrix. EPS also functions as local nutrient reservoir of various biomolecules, such as fermentable polysaccharides. A study on V. cholerae in 2017 suggested that due to osmotic pressure differences in V. cholerae biofilms, the microbial colonies physically swell, therefore maximizing their contact with nutritious surfaces and thus, nutrient uptake.

=== In microalgal biofilms ===
EPS is found in the matrix of other microbial biofilms such as microalgal biofilms. The formation of biofilm and structure of EPS share a lot of similarities with bacterial ones. The formation of biofilm starts with reversible absorption of floating cells to the surface. Followed by production of EPS, the adsorption will get irreversible. EPS will colonize the cells at the surface with hydrogen bonding. Replication of early colonizers will be facilitated by the presence of organic molecules in the matrix which will provide nutrients to the algal cells. As the colonizers are reproducing, the biofilm grows and becomes a 3-dimensional structure. Microalgal biofilms consist of 90% EPS and 10% algal cells. Algal EPS has similar components to the bacterial one; it is made up of proteins, phospholipids, polysaccharides, nucleic acids, humic substances, uronic acids and some functional groups, such as phosphoric, carboxylic, hydroxyl and amino groups. Algal cells consume EPS as their source of energy and carbon. Furthermore, EPS protects them from dehydration and reinforces the adhesion of the cells to the surface. In algal biofilms, EPS has two sub-categories; soluble EPS (sEPS) and the bounded EPS (bEPS) with former being distributed in the medium and the latter being attached to the algal cells. Bounded EPS can be further subdivided to tightly bounded EPS (TB-EPS) and loosely bounded EPS (LB-EPS). Several factors contribute to the composition of EPS including species, substrate type, nutrient availability, temperature, pH and light intensity.

== Ecology ==
Exopolysaccharides can facilitate the attachment of nitrogen-fixing bacteria to plant roots and soil particles, which mediates a symbiotic relationship. This is important for colonization of roots and the rhizosphere, which is a key component of soil food webs and nutrient cycling in ecosystems. It also allows for successful invasion and infection of the host plant. Bacterial extracellular polymeric substances can aid in bioremediation of heavy metals as they have the capacity to adsorb metal cations, among other dissolved substances. This can be useful in the treatment of wastewater systems, as biofilms are able to bind to and remove metals such as copper, lead, nickel, and cadmium. The binding affinity and metal specificity of EPS varies, depending on polymer composition as well as factors such as concentration and pH. In a geomicrobiological context, EPS have been observed to affect precipitation of minerals, particularly carbonates. EPS may also bind to and trap particles in biofilm suspensions, which can restrict dispersion and element cycling. Sediment stability can be increased by EPS, as it influences cohesion, permeability, and erosion of the sediment. There is evidence that the adhesion and metal-binding ability of EPS affects mineral leaching rates in both environmental and industrial contexts. These interactions between EPS and the abiotic environment allow for EPS to have a large impact on biogeochemical cycling. Predator-prey interactions between biofilms and bacterivores, such as the soil-dwelling nematode Caenorhabditis elegans, had been extensively studied. Via the production of sticky matrix and formation of aggregates, Yersinia pestis biofilms can prevent feeding by obstructing the mouth of C. elegans. Moreover, Pseudomonas aeruginosa biofilms can impede the slithering motility of C. elegans, termed as 'quagmire phenotype', resulting in trapping of C. elegans within the biofilms and preventing the exploration of nematodes to feed on susceptible biofilms. This significantly reduced the ability of predator to feed and reproduce, thereby promoting the survival of biofilms.

Capsular exopolysaccharides can protect pathogenic bacteria against desiccation and predation, and contribute to their pathogenicity. Sessile bacteria fixed and aggregated in biofilms are less vulnerable compared to drifting planktonic bacteria, as the EPS matrix is able to act as a protective diffusion barrier. The physical and chemical characteristics of bacterial cells can be affected by EPS composition, influencing factors such as cellular recognition, aggregation, and adhesion in their natural environments.

== Use ==
So far, biomass-based production of industrial microalgae has been widely applied in the fields from food and feed to high-value chemicals for pharmaceutical and ecological applications.

Although the commercial cultivation of microalgae became increasingly popular, only algal biomass is processed to current products, while huge volumes of algae-free media are unexploited in flow through cultures and after biomass harvesting of batch cultures. Medium recycling to save culturing costs faces the big risk of growth inhibition. High volumes of spent media give rise to environmental pollution and cost of water and nutrition supply in cultivation when the media are discarded directly to the environment. Therefore the application of recycling methods motivated by the simultaneous generation of high value products from spent medium bears potential in commercial and environmental perspectives.

=== Cosmetics and medicine ===
In nutraceutical industries, Arthrospira (Spirulina) and Chlorella are the most important species in commercialization as health foods and nutrition supplements with various health benefits including enhancing immune system activity, anti-tumor effects, and animal growth promotion, due to their abundant proteins, vitamins, active polysaccharides, and other important compounds. Microalgal carotenoids, with β-carotene from Dunaliella and astaxanthin from Haematococcus are commercially produced in large scale processes. Microalgal derived products are currently successfully developed for uses in cosmetics and pharmaceutical products. Examples include the polysaccharides from cyanobacteria used in personal skin care products and extracts of Chlorella sp. which contain oligopeptides that can promote firmness of the skin. In the pharmaceutical industries drug candidates with anti-inflammatory, anticancer, and anti-infective activities have been identified. For instance, adenosine from Phaeodactylum tricornutum, can act as an anti-arrhythmic agent for the treatment of tachycardia and the green algal metabolite caulerpin is featured in studies of anti-tuberculosis activities.

Moreover, some extracellular polysaccharides from microalgae have various bioactivities involving antitumor, anti-inflammatory, and antiviral activity, providing promising prospects for pharmaceutical applications.

=== Food and feed ===
Microalgae such as Isochrysis galbana, Nannochlor opsisoculata, Chaetoceros muelleri, Chaetoceros gracilis and P. tricornutum have been long utilized in aquaculture as direct or indirect feed sources in hatchery to provide excellent nutritional conditions for early juveniles of farmed fish, shellfish, and shrimp.

Furthermore, the EPS layer acts as a nutrient trap, facilitating bacterial growth. The exopolysaccharides of some strains of lactic acid bacteria, e.g., Lactococcus lactis subsp. cremoris, contribute a gelatinous texture to fermented milk products (e.g., Viili), and these polysaccharides are also digestible. An example of the industrial use of exopolysaccharides is the application of dextran in panettone and other breads in the bakery industry.

B. subtilis has gained interest for its probiotic properties due to its biofilm which allows it to effectively maintain a favorable microenvironment in the gastrointestinal tract. In order to survive the passage through the upper gastrointestinal tract, B. subtilis produces an extracellular matrix that protects it from stressful environments such as the highly acidic environment in the stomach.

=== Energy ===
Production of oleaginous microalgae are becoming attractive as alternative sources of biofuels with potential to meet global demand for renewable bioenergy. The enhanced oil recovery (EOR) using extracellular biopolymers from microalgae may be an upcoming field of application.

In recent years, EPS sugars from marine bacteria have been found to speed up the cleanup of oil spills. During the Deepwater Horizon oil spill in 2010, these EPS-producing bacteria were able to grow and multiply rapidly. It was later found that their EPS sugars dissolved the oil and formed oil aggregates on the ocean surface, which sped up the cleaning process. These oil aggregates also provided a valuable source of nutrients for other marine microbial communities. This let scientists modify and optimize the use of EPS sugars to clean up oil spills.

=== Agriculture and decontamination ===
During the growth, microalgae produce and secrete metabolites such as acetate or glycerol into the medium. Extracellular metabolites (EM) from microalgae have important ecological significances. For instance, marine microalgae release a large amount of dissolved organic substances (DOS), which serve as energy sources for heterotrophs in algal-bacterial symbiotic interactions. Excretions into the pericellular space determine, to a great degree, the course of allelopathic interactions between microalgae and other microorganisms. Some allelopathic compounds from microalgae are realized as environment-friendly herbicides or biocontrol agents with direct perspectives for their biotechnological use.

In B. subtilis, the protein matrix component, TasA, and the exopolysaccharide have both been shown to be essential for effective plant-root colonization in Arabidopsis and tomato plants. It was also suggested that TasA plays an important role in mediating interspecies aggregation with streptococci.

Due to the growing need to find a more efficient and environmentally friendly alternative to conventional waste removal methods, industries are paying more attention to the function of bacteria and their EPS sugars in bioremediation.

Researchers found that adding EPS sugars from cyanobacteria to wastewaters removes heavy metals such as copper, cadmium and lead. EPS sugars alone can physically interact with these heavy metals and take them in through biosorption. The efficiency of removal can be optimized by treating the EPS sugars with different acids or bases before adding them to wastewater. Some contaminated soils contain high levels of polycyclic aromatic hydrocarbons (PAH); EPS from the bacterium Zoogloea sp. and the fungus Aspergillus niger, are efficient at removing these toxic compounds. EPS contain enzymes such as oxidoreductase and hydrolase, which are capable of degrading PAH. The amount of PAH degradation depends on the concentration of EPS added to the soil. This method proves to be low cost and highly efficient.

=== New approaches to target biofilms ===
The application of nanoparticles (NP) are one of novel promising techniques to target biofilms due to their high surface-area-to-volume ratio, their ability to penetrate to the deeper layers of biofilms and the capacity to releasing antimicrobial agents in a controlled way. Studying NP-EPS interactions could provide deeper understanding on how to develop more effective nanoparticles. "smart release" nanocarriers that can penetrate biofilms and be triggered by pathogenic microenvironments to deliver drugs or multifunctional compounds, such as catalytic nanoparticles to aptamers, dendrimers, and bioactive peptides) have been developed to disrupt the EPS and the viability or metabolic activity of the embedded bacteria. Some factors that would alter the potentials of the NP to transport antimicrobial agents into the biofilm include physicochemical interactions of the NP with EPS components, the characteristics of the water spaces (pores) within the EPS matrix and the EPS matrix viscosity. Size and surface properties (charge and functional groups) of the NPs are the major determinants of the penetration in and the interaction with the EPS. Another potential antibiofilm strategy is phage therapy. Bacteriophages, viruses that invade specific bacterial host cells, were suggested to be effective agents in penetrating biofilms. In order to reach the maximum efficacy to eradicate biofilms, therapeutic strategies need to target both the biofilm matrix components as well as the embedded microorganisms to target the complex biofilm microenvironment.

== See also ==
- Extracellular matrix in multi-cellular organisms
- Exopolymer
- Integrin
- Sea snot
