= C10H8S =

The molecular formula C_{10}H_{8}S (molar mass: 160.24 g/mol, exact mass: 160.0347 u) may refer to:

- 1-Naphthalenethiol
- 2-Naphthalenethiol
