= C10H8 =

The molecular formula C_{10}H_{8} (molar mass: 128.17 g/mol, exact mass: 128.0626 u) may refer to:

- Azulene
- Bicyclo[6.2.0]decapentaene
- Fulvalene
- Naphthalene
