= Paullinia paullinioides =

Scientific classification
- Kingdom: Plantae
- Clade: Tracheophytes
- Clade: Angiosperms
- Clade: Eudicots
- Clade: Rosids
- Order: Sapindales
- Family: Sapindaceae
- Genus: Paullinia
- Species: P. paullinioides

Binomial name
- Paullinia paullinioides Radlkofer, 1895

Species of plant

Paullinia paullinioides is a flowering plant species in the genus of Paullinia found in South America. It was first described in 1895, by Ludwig Adolph Timotheus Radlkofer.

== Description ==
Paullinia paullinioides is a tropical liana. It has trifoliolate leaves with elliptic to ovate leaflets and fruit with spines 1.2–1.4 cm (1/3–2/3 in) long.

== Distribution ==
Paullinia paullinioides is found in the Amazon Basin in Brazil, Colombia, Ecuador and Peru. It has also been observed in Venezuela.

== Ecology ==
The species is host to the Muscodor vitigenus fungus that produces nearly pure naphthalene which acts as an insect repellent.
