= Sodium salt =

Group of ionic compounds

Sodium salts are salts composed of a sodium cation and any anion. The anion may be the conjugate base of some inorganic or organic acids, or any monatomic or polyatomic anion. They can be formed by the neutralization of acids with sodium hydroxide.

== Categorization ==
Sodium salts can be categorized into:

- sodium salts of carboxylic acids (e.g. sodium formate, HCOONa, the sodium salt of formic acid, and sodium acetate, CH_{3}COONa, the sodium salt of acetic acid) and
- sodium salts of inorganic acids (sulfonic acids, etc.)

== Organic sodium salts ==
Sodium salts of some fatty acids

Sodium oleate, the sodium salt of oleic acid.

Sodium palmitate, the sodium salt of palmitic acid.

Sodium stearate, the sodium salt of stearic acid.

=== Drugs ===
In pharmaceutical technology acidic pharmaceutical substances are often converted into sodium salts, because they are more stable, more soluble or membrane-permeable (bioavailable) than the base compound. Examples of such sodium salts are (selection): Bispyribac, bithionol, bosentan, brequinar, bromfenac, Cefmenoxime, ceftiofur, citicoline, cromolyn, diclofenac, Flucloxacillin, fosinopril, Mordant brown 33, naproxen, Netobimin, ozagrel, pantoprazole, pemetrexed, secobarbital, sitamaquin, sitaxentan, sulfamiderazin, sulfapyridine, sulfaquinoxaline, sulfathiazole, sulfazecin, thiamylal and mesna. Most of these salts are sodium salts of organic carboxylic acids or sulfonic acids.

=== Plant protection agents ===
Herbicides are often used as sodium salts for the reasons discussed above. One example is the sodium salt of methylflupyrsulfuron.

=== Cosmetics ===
Sodium salts of long chain sulfonic acids (e.g. sodium lauryl sulfate) are often included in toothpaste and shampoo. The sodium salts of fatty acids may serve as soaps and can therefore be called sodium soaps.

=== Dye production ===
Sodium salts of certain aromatic sulfonic acids—particularly naphthalenesulfonic acid—are used in the preparation of azo dyes.

== Inorganic sodium salts ==
Examples of important inorganic sodium salts are sodium fluoride, sodium chloride, sodium bromide, sodium iodide, sodium sulfate, sodium bicarbonate and sodium carbonate. Sodium amide (NaNH_{2}) is the sodium salt of ammonia (NH_{3}).
