= M. albus =

M. albus may refer to:

- Monopterus albus, a swamp eel species
- Melilotus albus, a sweet clover species
- Muscodor albus, a plant-dwelling fungus species

== See also ==
- Albus (disambiguation)
