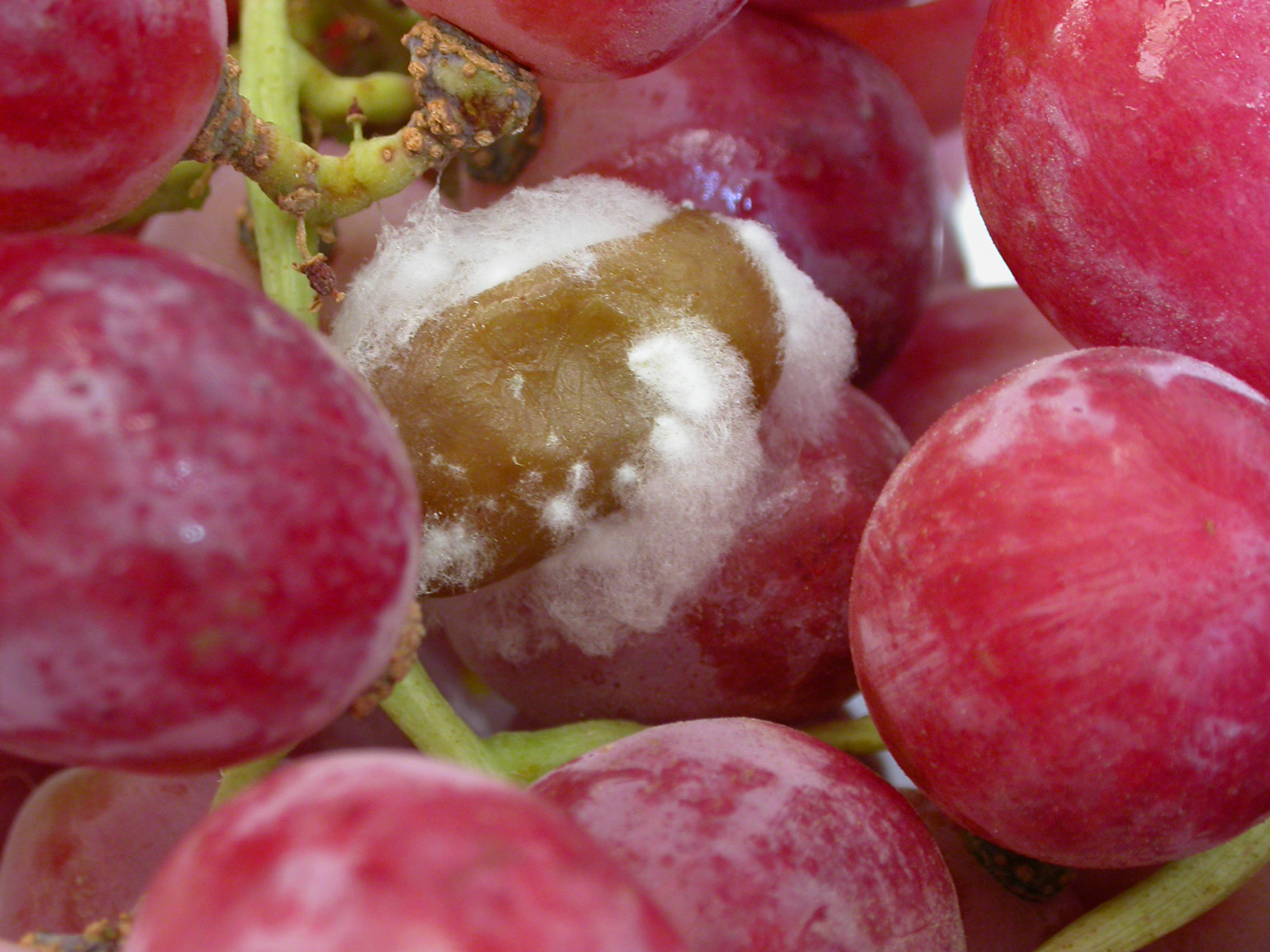
- Muscodor albus fungi produces chemicals that inhibit the growth of grey mold (pictured) on table grapes.

Scientific classification
- Domain: Eukaryota
- Kingdom: Fungi
- Division: Ascomycota
- Class: Sordariomycetes
- Order: Xylariales
- Family: Xylariaceae
- Genus: Muscodor; Worapong, Strobel & W.M.Hess (2001)

Type species
- Muscodor albus Worapong, Strobel & W.M.Hess (2001)

Species
- M. albus M. cinnamomi M. crispans M. fengyangensis M. roseus M. vitigenus M. yucatanensis

= Muscodor =

Genus of fungi

Muscodor is a genus of fungi in the family Xylariaceae noted for its ability to produce a variety of volatile organic compounds, which inhibit the growth of other fungi. The first species to be identified was M. albus. Other known species include M. roseus and M. vitigenus.

Known habitats of Muscodor species include Honduras, Venezuela, Thailand, Brazil, and Australia's Northern Territory. Members of the genus are believed to prefer tropical or monsoonal rainforests as habitats; efforts made to find them in the temperate rainforests of southern Australia and southern Chile have been unsuccessful.
