= Mordant brown 33 =

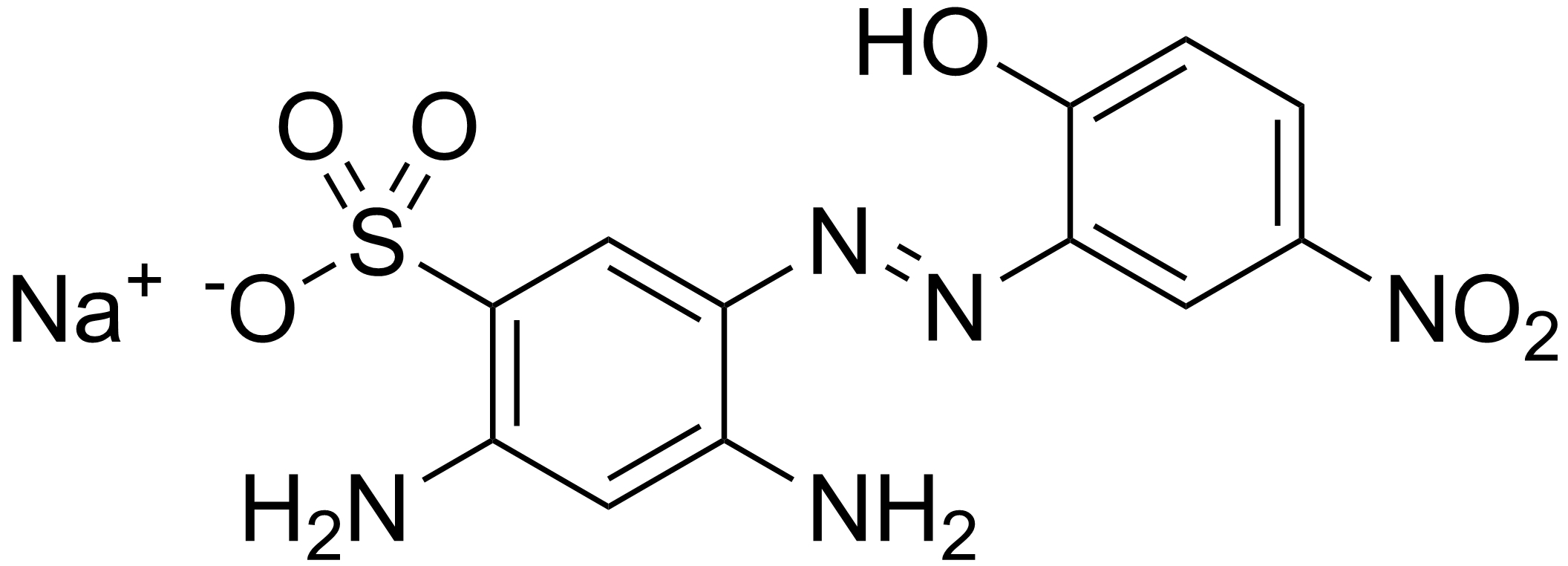
- Wireframe model of a mordant brown 33 tautomer

Names
- Systematic IUPAC name Sodium 2,4-diamino-5-[2-(3-nitro-6-oxocyclohexa-2,4-dien-1-ylidene)hydrazin-1-yl]benzene-1-sulfonate
- Other names Mordant brown 33; Chrome Brown RH; Sodium 2,4-diamino-5-[2-(3-nitro-6-oxocyclohexa-2,4-dien-1-ylidene)hydrazin-1-yl]benzenesulfonate

Identifiers
CAS Number	1082653-05-1; 3618-62-0 (non-specific)
3D model (JSmol)	Interactive image
Abbreviations	MB33
ChemSpider	7850278 (1E); 4588144 (1Z)
ECHA InfoCard	100.020.737
EC Number	222-810-5
PubChem CID	135414428; 9575826 (1E); 5483143 (1Z)
UNII	HW6KSE69YM
CompTox Dashboard (EPA)	DTXSID0063101
- InChI: InChI=1S/C12H11N5O6S.Na/c13-7-4-8(14)12(24(21,22)23)5-9(7)15-16-10-3-6(17(19)20)1-2-11(10)18;/h1-5,15H,13-14H2,(H,21,22,23);/q;+1/p-1 Key: CKWUOVPZRGZTSZ-UHFFFAOYSA-M; InChI=1S/C12H11N5O6S.Na/c13-7-4-8(14)12(24(21,22)23)5-9(7)15-16-10-3-6(17(19)20)1-2-11(10)18;/h1-5,15H,13-14H2,(H,21,22,23);/q;+1/p-1/b16-10+; InChI=1S/C12H11N5O6S.Na/c13-7-4-8(14)12(24(21,22)23)5-9(7)15-16-10-3-6(17(19)20)1-2-11(10)18;/h1-5,15H,13-14H2,(H,21,22,23);/q;+1/p-1/b16-10+; Key: CKWUOVPZRGZTSZ-QFHYWFJHSA-M
- SMILES: [Na+].O=C2/C=C\C(=C/C2=N\Nc1cc(c(N)cc1N)S([O-])(=O)=O)[N+]([O-])=O

Properties
Chemical formula	C_{12}H_{10}N_{5}NaO_{6}S
Molar mass	375.29 g·mol^{−1}

Hazards
- GHS labelling
Pictograms	(GHS05: Corrosive) (GHS07: Exclamation mark) (GHS08: Health hazard)
Signal word	Warning
Hazard statements	H317, H318, H341
Precautionary statements	P201, P202, P261, P272, P280, P281, P302+P352, P305+P351+P338, P308+P313, P310, P321, P333+P313, P363, P405, P501
- Except where otherwise noted, data are given for materials in their standard state (at 25 °C [77 °F], 100 kPa). verify (what is ?) Infobox references

Mordant brown 33 (MB33) is 2,4-diamino-5-(2-hydroxy-5-nitrophenylazo) benzene sulfonic acid sodium salt.

The UV-Visible spectra of MB33 in all mixtures investigated display three absorption bands in 50% ethanol within all the pH ranges 1.5-13.3 using Thiel buffer the maximum absorption of these bands is located at 438, 453 and a double head band at 410 and 475 nm . The band at 438 nm corresponds to absorption attributed to the cationic form (LH6) of MB33 (whereas L indicates to the parent structure of ligand without hydrogen protons) and disappears at pH > 3.0. The band at 453 nm corresponds to the absorption of the neutral form of the reagent (LH5-). The double head bands at 410 and 475 nm correspond to the di-anionic (LH_{4}^{2−}) of MB33.
