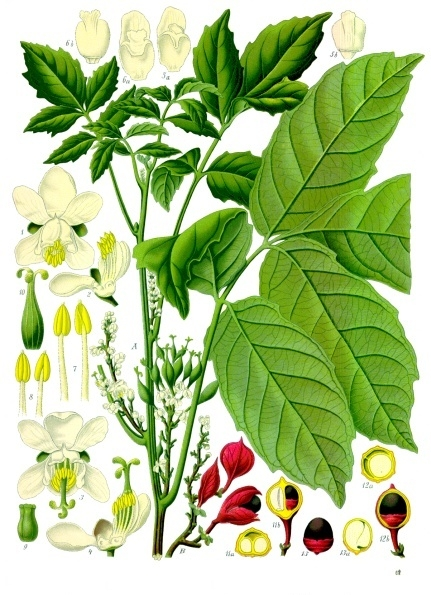
- Paullinia cupana

Scientific classification
- Kingdom: Plantae
- Clade: Tracheophytes
- Clade: Angiosperms
- Clade: Eudicots
- Clade: Rosids
- Order: Sapindales
- Family: Sapindaceae
- Subfamily: Sapindoideae
- Genus: Paullinia; L.

Species
- See text

Synonyms
- Castanella Spruce ex Benth. & Hook.f.; Corindum Adans.; Cururu Mill.; Enourea Aubl.; Geeria Neck.; Koernickea Klotzsch; Semarillaria Ruiz & Pav.; Tondin Schill.

= Paullinia =

Genus of flowering plants

Paullinia is a genus of flowering shrubs, small trees and lianas in the soapberry family, Sapindaceae and typical of tribe Paullinieae. It is native to tropical South America, Central America and the Caribbean.

The genus is named after the German medical botanist Christian Franz Paullini, who discovered the genus in the Caribbean in the 18th century.

== Species ==
As of January 2026, Plants of the World Online accepts the following 187 species:

- Paullinia acuminata Uittien
- Paullinia acutangula Pers.
- Paullinia alata (Ruiz & Pav.) G.Don
- Paullinia allenii Standl.
- Paullinia alsmithii J.F.Macbr.
- Paullinia anisoptera Turcz.
- Paullinia anodonta Radlk.
- Paullinia anomophylla Radlk.
- Paullinia apoda Radlk.
- Paullinia aspera Radlk.
- Paullinia austin-smithii Standl.
- Paullinia baileyi Standl.
- Paullinia barbadensis Jacq.
- Paullinia bernhardii Uittien
- Paullinia bicorniculata Somner
- Paullinia bidentata Radlk.
- Paullinia bilobulata Radlk.
- Paullinia bipinnata Poir.
- Paullinia boliviana Radlk.
- Paullinia bracteosa Radlk.
- Paullinia brenesii Croat
- Paullinia brentberlinii Croat
- Paullinia bristanii Croat
- Paullinia buricana Croat
- Paullinia caloptera Radlk.
- Paullinia cambessedesii Triana & Planch.
- Paullinia capitata Benth. ex Triana & Planch.
- Paullinia capreolata (Aubl.) Radlk.
- Paullinia carpopodea Cambess.
- Paullinia carrenoi Steyerm.
- Paullinia castaneifolia Radlk.
- Paullinia cauliflora Jacq.
- Paullinia cearensis Somner & Ferrucci
- Paullinia chocoensis Cuatrec.
- Paullinia cidii Somner & Acev.-Rodr.
- Paullinia cirrhipes Cuatrec.
- Paullinia clathrata Radlk.
- Paullinia clavigera Schltdl.
- Paullinia clematidifolia Killip & Cuatrec.
- Paullinia conduplicata Radlk.
- Paullinia connaracea Triana & Planch.
- Paullinia coriacea Casar.
- Paullinia correae Croat
- Paullinia costaricensis Radlk.
- Paullinia costata Schltdl. & Cham.
- Paullinia cristata Radlk.
- Paullinia cuneata Radlk.
- Paullinia cupana Kunth
- Paullinia cururu L.
- Paullinia curvicuspis Radlk.
- Paullinia dasygonia Radlk.
- Paullinia dasyphylla Radlk.
- Paullinia dasystachya Radlk.
- Paullinia decorticans Somner & Acev.-Rodr.
- Paullinia degranvillei Acev.-Rodr.
- Paullinia densiflora Sm.
- Paullinia echinata Radlk.
- Paullinia elegans Cambess.
- Paullinia elliptica Cuatrec.
- Paullinia elongata Radlk.
- Paullinia emetica R.E.Schult.
- Paullinia enneaphylla G.Don
- Paullinia eriocarpa Triana & Planch.
- Paullinia exalata Radlk.
- Paullinia ferruginea Casar.
- Paullinia fibulata Rich.
- Paullinia filicifolia Cuatrec.
- Paullinia fimbriata Radlk.
- Paullinia firma Radlk.
- Paullinia fissistipula J.F.Macbr.
- Paullinia fistulosa Radlk.
- Paullinia fournieri J.F.Morales
- Paullinia fraxinifolia Triana & Planch.
- Paullinia fruticosa Somner & Acev.-Rodr.
- Paullinia funicularis Radlk.
- Paullinia fuscescens Kunth
- Paullinia fusiformis Radlk.
- Paullinia gigantea Poepp.
- Paullinia globosa Killip & Cuatrec.
- Paullinia glomerulosa Radlk.
- Paullinia granatensis (Planch. & Linden) Radlk.
- Paullinia grandifolia Benth. ex Radlk.
- Paullinia guaviarensis Killip & Cuatrec.
- Paullinia hemiptera D.R.Simpson
- Paullinia hispida Jacq.
- Paullinia hondurensis Acev.-Rodr. & Somner
- Paullinia hymenobracteata Radlk. ex Donn.Sm.
- Paullinia hystrix Radlk.
- Paullinia imberbis Radlk.
- Paullinia ingifolia Rich.
- Paullinia integra Cuatrec.
- Paullinia interrupta Benth.
- Paullinia isoptera Radlk.
- Paullinia jamaicensis Macfad.
- Paullinia josecuatrii J.F.Macbr.
- Paullinia kallunkii Croat
- Paullinia killipii J.F.Macbr.
- Paullinia laeta Radlk.
- Paullinia largifolia Radlk.
- Paullinia latifolia Benth. ex Radlk.
- Paullinia leiocarpa Griseb.
- Paullinia linearis Radlk.
- Paullinia lingulata Acev.-Rodr.
- Paullinia livescens Radlk.
- Paullinia macrophylla Kunth
- Paullinia mallophylla Radlk.
- Paullinia manarae Steyerm.
- Paullinia marginata Casar.
- Paullinia mariae J.F.Macbr.
- Paullinia martinellii Acev.-Rodr. & Somner
- Paullinia martinensis Cuatrec.
- Paullinia mazanensis J.F.Macbr.
- Paullinia medullosa Radlk.
- Paullinia meliifolia Juss.
- Paullinia micrantha Cambess.
- Paullinia microneura Cuatrec.
- Paullinia mollicoma Steyerm.
- Paullinia morii Croat
- Paullinia navicularis Radlk.
- Paullinia nitida Kunth
- Paullinia nobilis Radlk.
- Paullinia nuriensis Steyerm.
- Paullinia obovata (Ruiz & Pav.) Pers.
- Paullinia oldemanii Acev.-Rodr.
- Paullinia olivacea Radlk.
- Paullinia panamensis Croat
- Paullinia parvibractea Radlk.
- Paullinia paullinioides Radlk.
- Paullinia pinnata L.
- Paullinia plagioptera Radlk.
- Paullinia platymisca Radlk.
- Paullinia plumieri Triana & Planch.
- Paullinia prevostiana Acev.-Rodr.
- Paullinia pseudota Radlk.
- Paullinia pterocarpa Triana & Planch.
- Paullinia pterophylla Triana & Planch.
- Paullinia quitensis Radlk.
- Paullinia reticulata Radlk.
- Paullinia revoluta Radlk.
- Paullinia rhomboidea Radlk.
- Paullinia riodocensis Somner
- Paullinia rubiginosa Cambess.
- Paullinia rufescens Rich.
- Paullinia rugosa Benth. ex Radlk.
- Paullinia scaberula R.E.Schult.
- Paullinia scabra Benth.
- Paullinia selenoptera Radlk.
- Paullinia seminuda Radlk.
- Paullinia serjaniifolia Triana & Planch.
- Paullinia setosa Radlk.
- Paullinia simulans J.F.Macbr.
- Paullinia sphaerocarpa Rich. ex Juss.
- Paullinia spicata Benth.
- Paullinia spicithyrsa Cuatrec.
- Paullinia splendida R.E.Schult.
- Paullinia sprucei J.F.Macbr.
- Paullinia stellata Radlk.
- Paullinia stenopetala Sagot
- Paullinia sternii Croat
- Paullinia stipitata Cuatrec.
- Paullinia stipularis Benth. ex Radlk.
- Paullinia subauriculata Radlk.
- Paullinia subnuda Radlk.
- Paullinia talamancensis J.F.Morales
- Paullinia tarapotensis Radlk.
- Paullinia tenera Poepp.
- Paullinia tenuifolia Standl. ex J.F.Macbr.
- Paullinia ternata Radlk.
- Paullinia tetragona Aubl.
- Paullinia tomentosa Jacq.
- Paullinia tricornis Radlk.
- Paullinia trifoliolata Obando, R.Bernal & Acev.-Rodr.
- Paullinia trigonia Vell.
- Paullinia trilatera Radlk.
- Paullinia triptera Triana & Planch.
- Paullinia tumbesensis D.R.Simpson
- Paullinia turbacensis Kunth
- Paullinia uchocacha J.F.Macbr.
- Paullinia uloptera Radlk.
- Paullinia unifoliolata Perdiz & Ferrucci
- Paullinia venezuelana Radlk.
- Paullinia venosa Radlk.
- Paullinia vespertilio Sw.
- Paullinia weinmanniifolia Mart.
- Paullinia wurdackii Acev.-Rodr. & Somner
- Paullinia xestophylla Radlk.
- Paullinia yoco R.E.Schult. & Killip

== Uses ==
Several uses are recorded. The fruit of several species are edible, with P. cupana (Guaraná) being the most popular. Other species, notably P. yoco (Yoco), are used as herbal medicine for various treatments. The sap of some species, notably P. cururu is highly toxic, and is used as an arrow poison by Native American tribes in South America. Similarly, the long flexible stems of Paullinia pinnata are used to poison fish in shallow pools, as described by the English naturalist Henry Walter Bates in his book The Naturalist on the River Amazons.
