= Muscodor vitigenus =

Scientific classification
- Kingdom: Fungi
- Division: Ascomycota
- Class: Sordariomycetes
- Order: Xylariales
- Family: Xylariaceae
- Genus: Muscodor
- Species: M. vitigenus

Binomial name
- Muscodor vitigenus Daisy, Strobel, Ezra & W.M. Hess

Species of fungus

Muscodor vitigenus is an endophytic fungus which colonizes Paullinia paullinioides, a liana of the Peruvian Amazon rainforests. It has the unusual property of, under certain circumstances, producing near-pure naphthalene, an insect repellent.
