= Paullinia navicularis =

Conservation status
- Vulnerable (IUCN 3.1)

Scientific classification
- Kingdom: Plantae
- Clade: Tracheophytes
- Clade: Angiosperms
- Clade: Eudicots
- Clade: Rosids
- Order: Sapindales
- Family: Sapindaceae
- Genus: Paullinia
- Species: P. navicularis

Binomial name
- Paullinia navicularis Radlk.

Species of flowering plant

Paullinia navicularis is a species of plant in the family Sapindaceae. It is endemic to Ecuador.
