= Marine mucilage =

Type of organic matter found in the sea

Marine mucilage, also referenced as sea snot or sea saliva, is thick, gelatinous organic matter found around the world's oceans, lately observed in the Mediterranean Sea.

Marine mucilage carries diverse microorganisms. Triggers that cause it to form include increased phosphorus, drought conditions, and climate change. Its effects are widespread, affecting fishing industries, smothering sea life, and spreading bacteria and viruses. Citizens and governments around the world are working to institute countermeasures, including treatment, seawater cleanup, and other public policies.

== Composition ==
Marine mucilage has many components, including diverse microorganisms including viruses and prokaryotes, debris, proteins, minerals, and exopolymeric compounds with colloidal properties. Although various historical definitions have not consolidated, it is agreed that mucilages are complex chemical substances, as well as complex natural materials. Its composition can change over time.

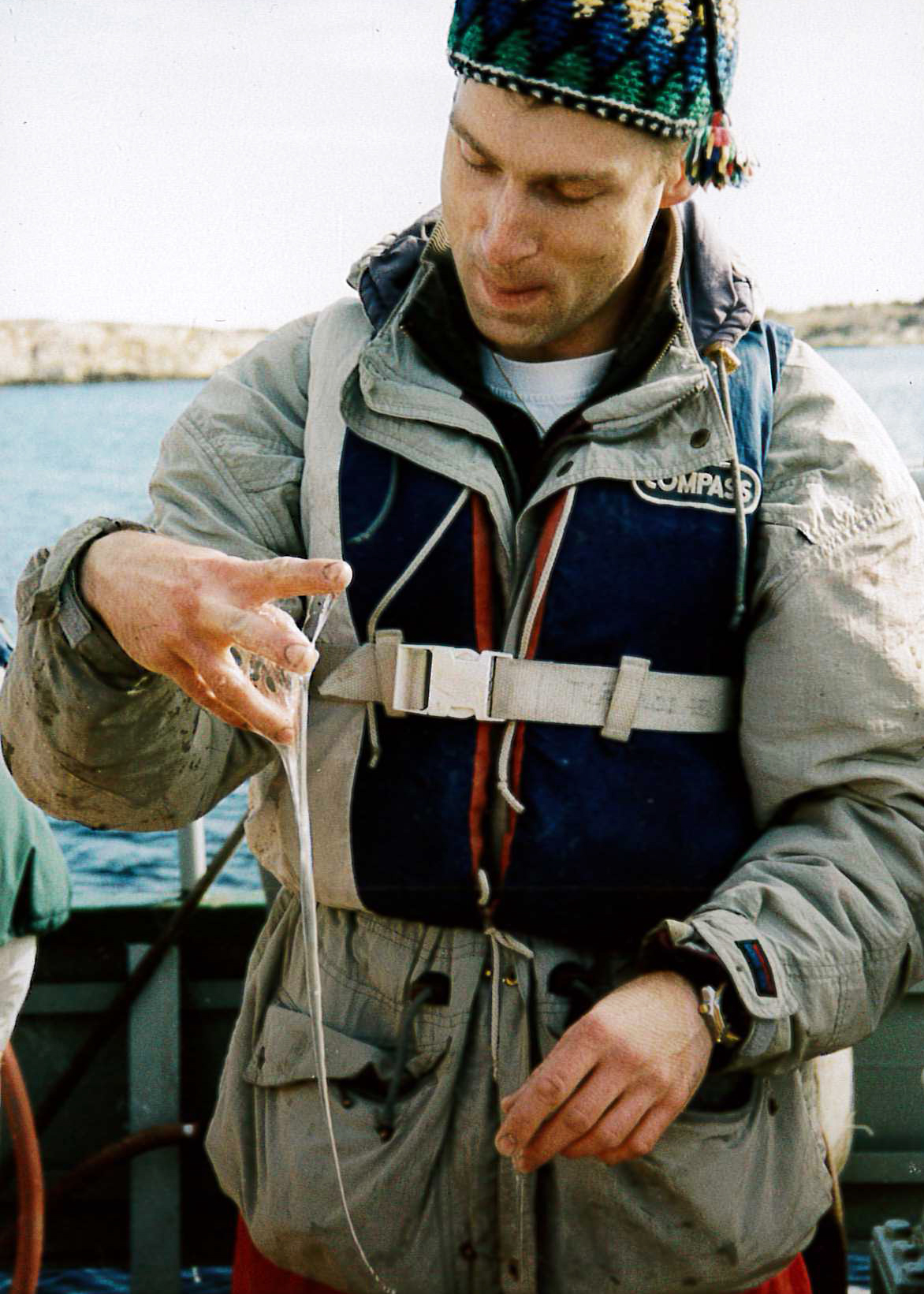
Sea snot – A demonstration of its rheological (visco-elastic) properties

== Causes ==
Marine mucilage appears following an increase of phosphorus. In one 2021 case phosphorus values were three to four times higher than the previous year. Other excess nutrients combined with drought conditions and prolonged warm sea temperatures and calm weather contributed. Marine mucilage is also produced by phytoplankton when they are stressed.

Anthropogenic global climate change is likely increasing marine mucilage. Warmer, slower moving waters increase production and allow it to accumulate in massive sheets. In the Mediterranean Sea, the frequency of marine mucilage events increases with warm temperature anomalies.

== Marine mucilage and biogeochemistry ==
Marine mucilage is a natural occurrence in marine environments, but its presence in excessive amounts can indicate environmental stress and poor water quality. Biogeochemistry plays a crucial role in the formation and dynamics of marine mucilage. Factors such as nutrient availability, temperature, salinity, and microbial activity influence the production and degradation of organic matter that contributes to mucilage formation. Excessive nutrients, often from anthropogenic sources such as agricultural runoff and wastewater discharge, can accelerate phytoplankton growth and mucilage formation, leading to eutrophication.

Understanding how mucilage interacts with biogeochemistry is vital for monitoring and managing coastal ecosystems. Recent studies have utilized advanced remote sensing techniques, such as Sentinel-2 satellite imagery, to map mucilage distribution and assess environmental conditions. These images, combined with advanced processing techniques, allowed them to notice subtle changes in water quality and identify areas affected by mucilage accumulations. Through the use of spectral indices such as Normalized Difference Turbidity Index (NDTI), Normalized Difference Water Index (NDWI), and Automated Mucilage Extraction Index (AMEI). By employing spectral indices and deep learning methods like Convolutional Neural Networks (CNNs), researchers can improve mucilage detection over large areas. By integrating remote sensing data with biogeochemical models and field observations, researchers can gain insight into the underlying mechanisms that drive mucilage formation and develop strategies to mitigate its effects on coastal environments.

The carbon cycle is affected by the marine mucilage. The release of dissolved organic carbon (DOC) from mucilage contributes to the organic carbon reserve in the marine ecosystem. This infusion of organic carbon stimulates the growth and metabolism of microbial communities in and around the mucilage. As these microbes consume DOC, they respire and convert organic carbon into carbon dioxide (CO_{2}) through microbial respiration. This cycle contributes to the exchange of CO_{2} between the ocean and the atmosphere, potentially affecting atmospheric CO_{2} levels and global carbon budgets.

Mucilage events affect the efficiency of the biological pump, a vital mechanism in the ocean carbon cycle. The biological pump explains how carbon moves from the ocean surface to its depths through the sinking of organic particles such as marine snow and phytoplankton. By trapping organic matter and microorganisms, mucilage can accelerate the sinking rate of organic particles and facilitate their transfer to deeper ocean layers.

== History ==
Marine mucilage was first reported in 1729. However, John Lawson describes in his book, Lawson's History of North Carolina (1714, pages 2–3): "There was left by the Tide, several strange species of a muciligmous slimy substance 'though living, and very aptly mov'd at their First Appearanice; yet, being left on the dry Sand, (by the Beams of the Sun) soon exhale and Vanish."

The Deepwater Horizon oil spill in the Gulf of Mexico created large amounts of marine mucilage. Scientists are not sure of the mechanism for this, but one theory asserts that a massive kill of microscopic marine life created a "blizzard" of marine snow. Scientists worry that the mass of marine mucilage could pose a biohazard to surviving marine life in the area. Marine mucilage left by the spill likely resulted in the loss of sea life in the Gulf, as evidenced by a dead field of deepwater coral 11 kilometers from the Deepwater Horizon station.

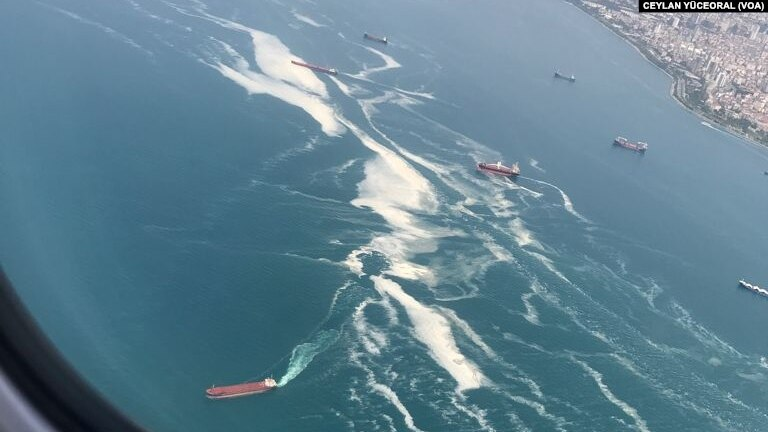
Overhead view of sea snot accumulated in large groupings off the coast in the Mediterranean Sea.

The Mediterranean experienced the worse effects of marine mucilage in 2021. Exponential growth afflicted the Mediterranean and other seas. In early 2021, marine mucilage spread in the Sea of Marmara, due to pollution from wastewater dumped into seawater, which led to the proliferation of phytoplankton, and threatened the marine biome. The port of Erdek at the Sea of Marmara was covered by mucilage. Turkish workers embarked on a massive effort to vacuum it up in June 2021. Yalıköy port in Ordu Province witnessed accumulating mucilage in June 2021, in the Black Sea. Fines were issued to companies discovered to be dumping wastewater.

== Effects ==
Increasing marine mucilage has become an issue in public health, economic, and environmental matters. Excessive marine mucilage was observed as early as 2009.

=== Public health ===
While marine mucilage is not toxic to humans, public health concerns are associated with it. Due to its complex makeup, marine mucilage contains pathogenic bacteria and transports marine diseases. The majority of such diseases affect both marine invertebrates and vertebrates.

=== Economic ===
Marine mucilage has had an impact on economies around the world, especially those that revolve around the Mediterranean. Marine mucilage has long been seen as a nuisance to the fishing industry, as it clogs fishing nets. Coastal towns that rely on tourism suffer from unappealing waters. Marine mucilage produce an offensive smell and makes the ocean unsuitable for bathing.

=== Environmental ===
Marine mucilage can coat the gills of sea creatures subsumed in it, cutting off oxygen and killing them. Marine mucilage floating on the surface also can significantly limit sunlight that nourishes coral and vegetation.

== Countermeasures ==
Countermeasures include collecting marine mucilage from the sea surface and laying barriers on the sea surface to prevent it from spreading. Long-term countermeasures include improving wastewater treatment, creating marine protected areas, and limiting climate change. Another approach involves attracting activity such as tourism that prevents the water from stagnating for long periods. Introducing marine species that can consume excessive nutrients.

== See also ==
- Marine snow – Shower of organic detritus in the ocean
