= 2-Naphthalenethiol =

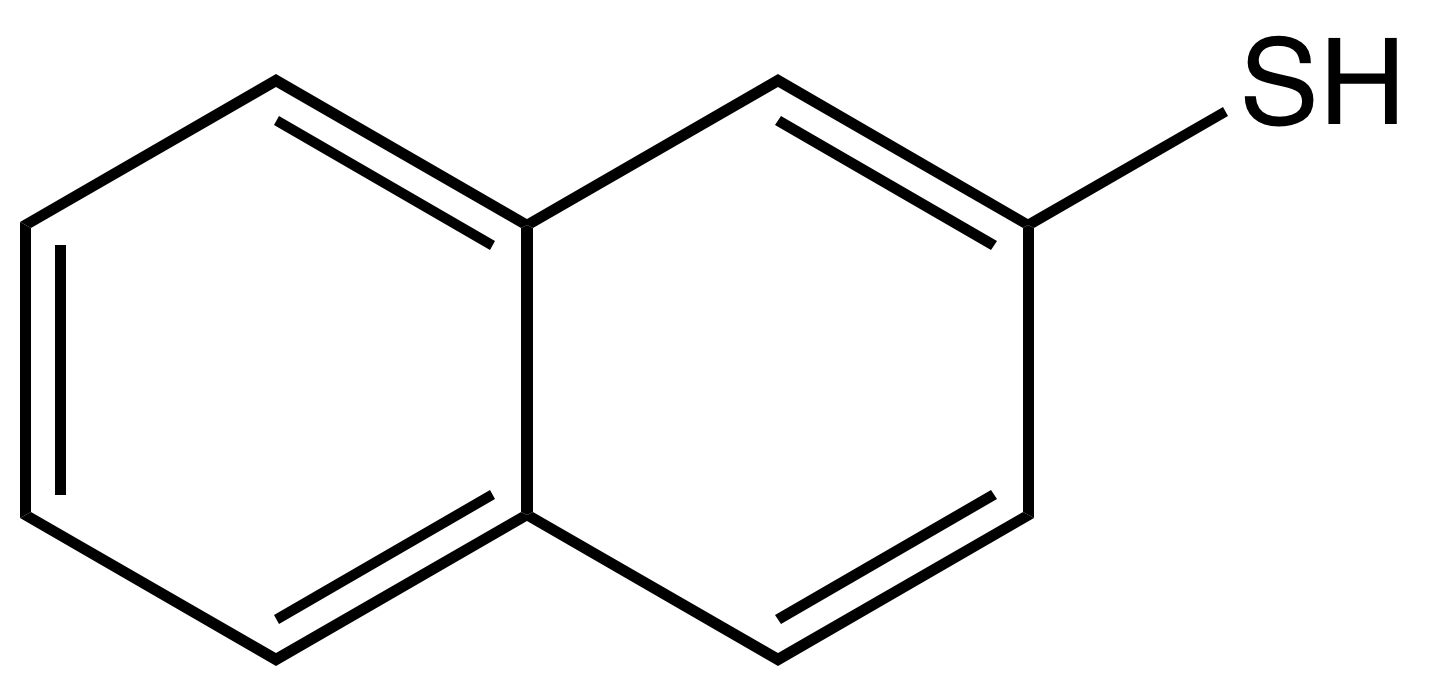

Names
- Preferred IUPAC name Naphthalene-2-thiol

Identifiers
CAS Number	91-60-1
3D model (JSmol)	Interactive image
ChemSpider	6791
ECHA InfoCard	100.001.893
EC Number	202-082-5
PubChem CID	7058
UNII	SZ5U1S741V
CompTox Dashboard (EPA)	DTXSID1059028
- InChI: InChI=1S/C10H8S/c11-10-6-5-8-3-1-2-4-9(8)7-10/h1-7,11H Key: RFCQDOVPMUSZMN-UHFFFAOYSA-N
- SMILES: C1=CC=C2C=C(C=CC2=C1)S

Properties
Chemical formula	C_{10}H_{8}S
Molar mass	160.23 g·mol^{−1}
Appearance	White solid
Odor	Sulfurous, mercaptan, burnt rubber,
Melting point	80–81 °C (176–178 °F; 353–354 K)
Boiling point	92–94 °C (198–201 °F; 365–367 K) (at 0.4 mmHg)

Hazards
- GHS labelling
Pictograms	(GHS07: Exclamation mark)
Signal word	Warning
Hazard statements	H302
Precautionary statements	P264, P270, P301+P312, P330, P501
- Except where otherwise noted, data are given for materials in their standard state (at 25 °C [77 °F], 100 kPa). Infobox references

2-Naphthalenethiol is an organosulfur compound with the formula C_{10}H_{7}SH. It is a white solid. It is one of two monothiols of naphthalene, the other being 1-naphthalenethiol.

== Synthesis and reactions ==
2-Naphthalenethiol is prepared from 2-naphthol by the Newman–Kwart rearrangement starting from a thiocarbamate. It undergoes lithiation at the 1 and 3-position.

It can be used as a flavouring agent and has been described as having an “artichoke”, “meaty” and “creamy” taste”.
