= Paullinia yoco =

Scientific classification
- Kingdom: Plantae
- Clade: Embryophytes
- Clade: Tracheophytes
- Clade: Angiosperms
- Clade: Eudicots
- Clade: Rosids
- Order: Sapindales
- Family: Sapindaceae
- Genus: Paullinia
- Species: P. yoco

Binomial name
- Paullinia yoco (R.E.Schult.) Killip 1942

Species of vine

Paullinia yoco, or yoco, is a liana species of Paullinia which naturally occurs in southern Colombia, Ecuador, and Peru. It was traditionally used by indigenous groups to create a stimulating beverage because of its caffeine and theobromine content and was believed to have medicinal properties as well.
