= Muscodor roseus =

Scientific classification
- Domain: Eukaryota
- Kingdom: Fungi
- Division: Ascomycota
- Class: Sordariomycetes
- Order: Xylariales
- Family: Xylariaceae
- Genus: Muscodor
- Species: M. roseus

Binomial name
- Muscodor roseus Worapong, Strobel & W.M.Hess (2002)

Species of fungus

Muscodor roseus is an anamorphic fungus in the family Xylariaceae. It is an endophyte that colonizes the inner bark, sapwood and outer xylem of the plants Grevillea pteridifolia and Erythrophleum chlorostachys, found in the Northern Territory of Australia. It grows as a pinkish, felt-like mycelium on several media, and produces a mixture of volatile antibiotics. Cultures tend to have a musty odour. The specific epithet roseus means "pink".
