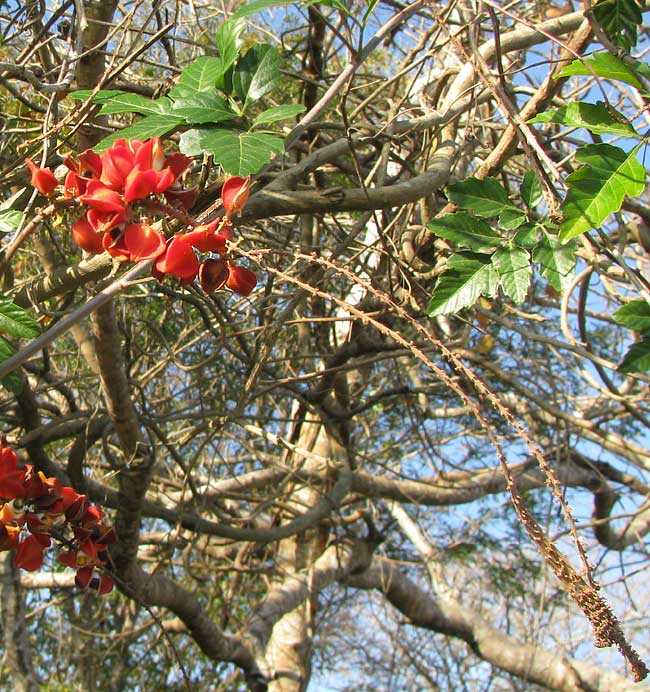
- Paullinia fuscescens red fruits and leaves

Scientific classification
- Kingdom: Plantae
- Clade: Tracheophytes
- Clade: Angiosperms
- Clade: Eudicots
- Clade: Rosids
- Order: Sapindales
- Family: Sapindaceae
- Genus: Paullinia
- Species: P. fuscescens

Binomial name
- Paullinia fuscescens Kunth

Synonyms
- Synonymy: Paullinia fusca Griseb.; Paullinia fuscencens var. glabrata Croat; Paullinia fuscescens f. velutina Radlk.; Paullinia micropterygia Miq.; Paullinia pubescens DC.; Paullinia velutlina G. Don; Serjania lupulina Benth.; Serjania mexicana Seem.; Serjania pubescens Kunth

= Paullinia fuscescens =

Species of plant

Paullinia fuscescens, with no English name other than moldy bread and cheese used for several species, is a woody vine occurring from Mexico and the Caribbean into northern South America. It belongs to the family Sapindaceae.

== Description ==
Paullinia fuscescens is recognized by these features:

- It is a woody vine climbing up to 7 m (23 ft) by means of spiraling tendrils which often arise in pairs from atop the inflorescence's peduncle. Smaller branches bear yellow hairs and when wounded produce a milky sap.
- Leaves up to 7 cm long (2¾ inch) arise individually along the stem and are divided into nine leaflets arranged in three groups, i.e. they are biternate. The leaflet margins are shallowly and somewhat irregularly toothed, the blade tips are blunt and the bases gradually narrow to their attachment point.
- Inflorescences arise singly from leaf axils reaching 15 cm long (~6 inches).
- Flowers are mostly dioecious, but mingled with a few flowers of the opposite sex or a few with both male and female parts; they are "polygamodioecious". They have five sepals, four petals which are white or yellowish, and eight stamens.
- Fruits are three-angled or three-winged capsules up to 2 cm long producing one to three seeds. When ripe they turn red or orangish.

== Taxonomy ==
Paullinia fuscescens is one of many taxa first scientifically collected by Aimé Bonpland and Alexander von Humboldt on their exploratory American Expedition of 1799-1804, plant collections from which were made available for publication to the German botanist Carl Sigismund Kunth. Kunth's 1821 Latin description of Paullinia fuscescens says that it grew on the banks of the Amazon River.

=== Etymology ===
The genus name Paullinia is a New Latin name honoring the Danish botanist Simon Paulli.

The species name fuscescens is from the Latin fuscescens, meaning "becoming dark", possibly referring to the brownish branchlets and partially dark-haired petioles, which Kunth described in Latin as "fuscescentibus" and "fuscescenti-hirti", respectively.

== Distribution ==
Paullinia fuscescens occurs in Mexico except for the dry northern parts, the Mexican Plateau and other high elevations; it is also found in the Caribbean, Central America and northern South America including Ecuador.

== Habitat ==
In the Caribbean, Paullinia fuscescens occurs in disturbed areas and lower elevations. In Honduras it has been collected in a sea-level pine forest with grass. In the Yucatan Peninsula of Mexico, it inhabits low-growing forests sometimes flooded with water, and various kinds of tropical forests experiencing extended dry seasons.

== Ecology ==
Larvae of the tomato orange banner butterfly Temenis laothöe liberia prefer to feed on Paullinia fuscescens. It is speculated that by feeding on this species, known to be used to stun or paralyze fish by inhibiting their respiration, making them easier to catch, the larva's body accumulates enough toxin to cause it to be avoided by predators.

== Human uses ==
=== In construction ===
In Mexico, the tough stems of Paullinia fuscescens are used for binding fences and the frameworks of huts.

=== In traditional medicine ===
In Mexico's Jalisco state, decoctions of stem sections of Paullinia fuscescens are taken orally for kidney problems.

However, seeds of Paullinia fuscescens are reported to be slow-acting but deadly poisonous, allegedly having been employed as a method of killing criminals. Also, citing reports of Paullinia fuscescens used as an insecticide, researchers in Venezuela found that an extract using methanol made from stem sections of the species caused strong antibacterial activity and a cytotoxic effect on a species of brine shrimp.

=== In traditional fishing ===
Crushed stems of Paullinia fuscescens may be placed in water as a narcotic to anesthetize fish, making them easier to catch.

== Gallery ==
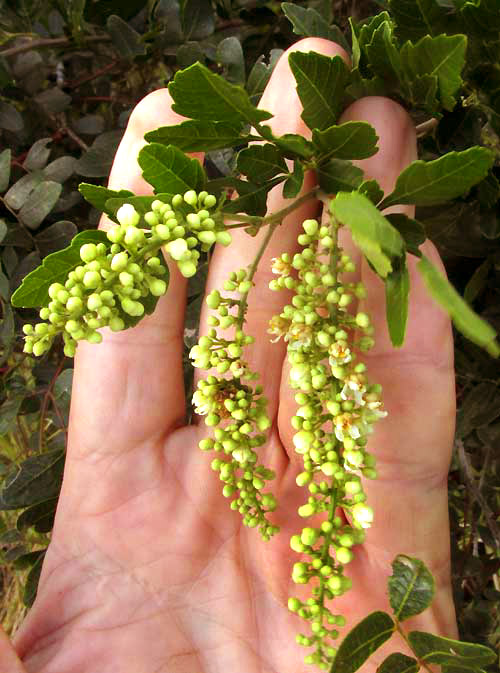
Inflorescences

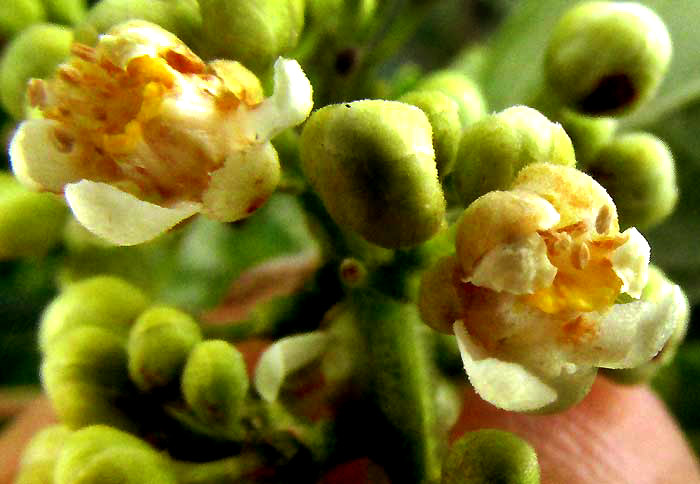
Flowers

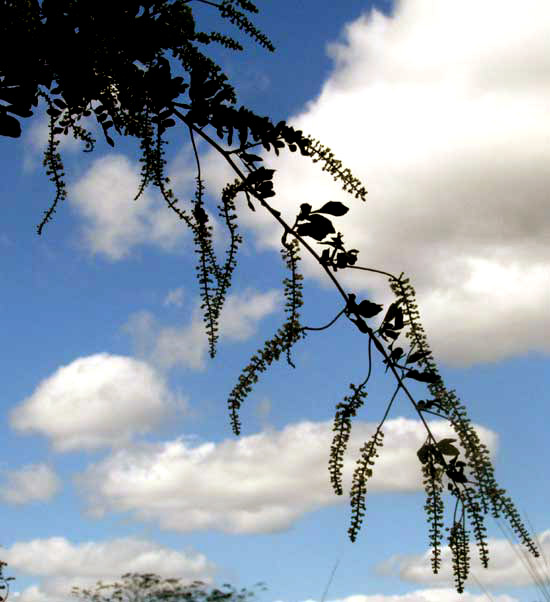
Leafy, flowering branch dangling from a tree

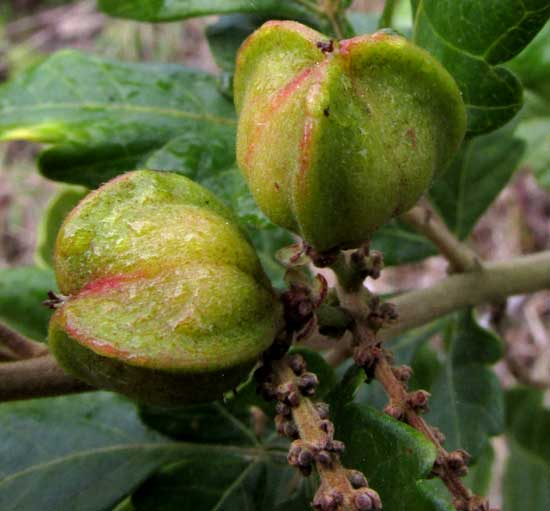
Immature fruits

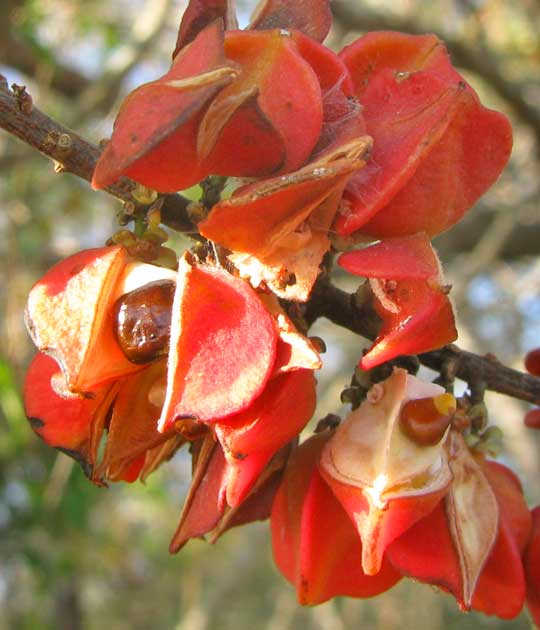
Mature capsular fruits splitting apart

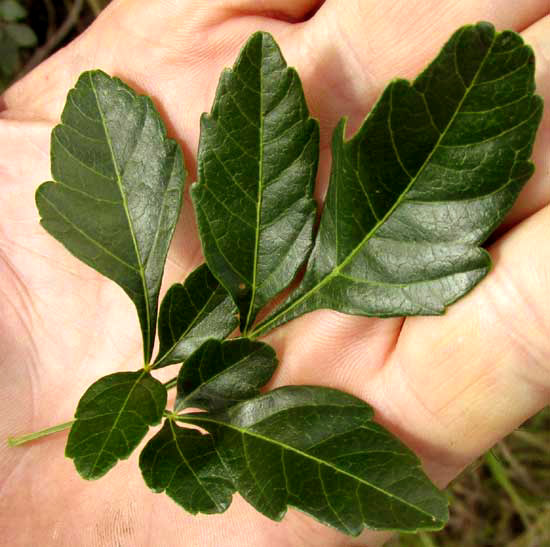
Compound biternate leaf
