= Naphthalenesulfonate =

Class of chemical compounds

Naphthalenesulfonates are derivatives of sulfonic acid that contain a naphthalene functional unit. A subfamily of compounds are the aminonaphthalenesulfonic acids, which describes precursors to several azo dyes.

Naphthalenesulfonates

amaranth dye, an azo dye

amido black, a azo dye

congo red, a popular azo dye

trypan blue, an azo dye

suramin, a medication used to treat African sleeping sickness and river blindness

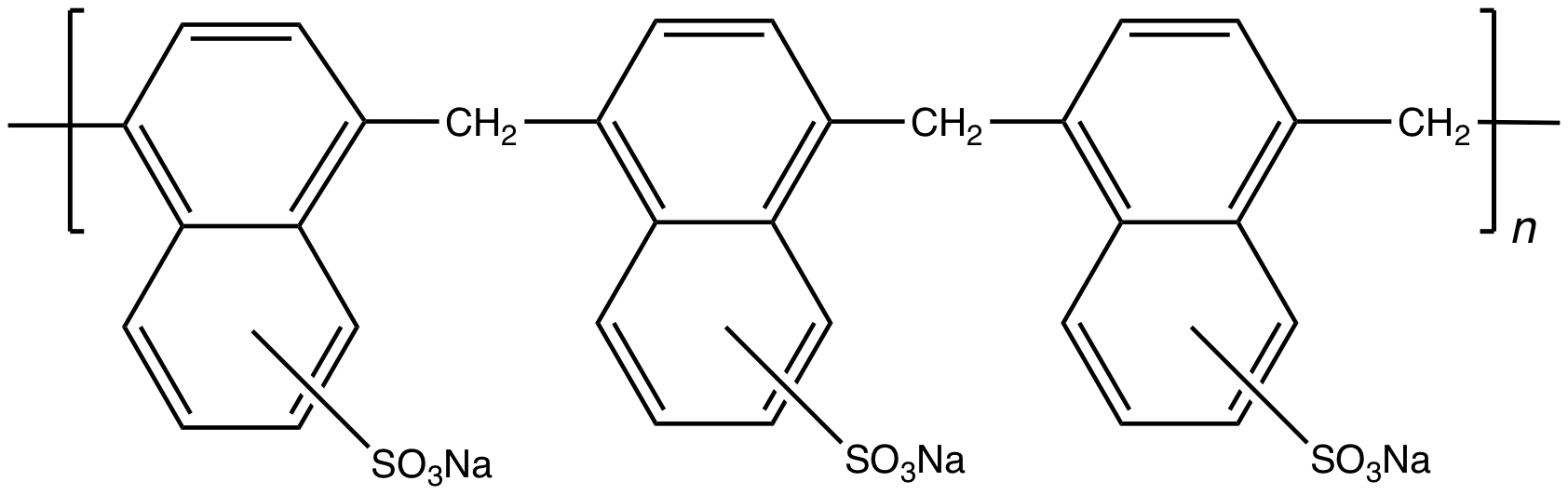
Naphthalenesulfonate/formaldehyde superplasticizer

The alkylnaphthalene sulfonates are used as superplasticizers in concrete. They are produced on a large scale by condensation of naphthalenesulfonate or alkylnaphthalenesulfonates with formaldehyde. Also called water reducers, they improves the flowability of concrete (before it sets), which allows for high-strength, high-performance concrete and mortar with lower water-to-cement ratios.
