= Naphthalene-2-sulfonic acid =

Names
- Preferred IUPAC name Naphthalene-2-sulfonic acid
- Other names 2-Naphthalenesulfonic acid, napsylate (salt), napsilate (salt)

Identifiers
CAS Number	120-18-3
3D model (JSmol)	Interactive image
Beilstein Reference	1955756
ChEMBL	ChEMBL1234624
ChemSpider	8113
ECHA InfoCard	100.003.978
EC Number	204-375-3
PubChem CID	8420
UNII	O9S4K2S25E
CompTox Dashboard (EPA)	DTXSID5044788
- InChI: InChI=1S/C10H8O3S/c11-14(12,13)10-6-5-8-3-1-2-4-9(8)7-10/h1-7H,(H,11,12,13) Key: KVBGVZZKJNLNJU-UHFFFAOYSA-N
- SMILES: C1=CC=C2C=C(C=CC2=C1)S(=O)(=O)O

Properties
Chemical formula	C_{10}H_{8}O_{3}S
Molar mass	208.23 g·mol^{−1} (anhydrous)
Appearance	White solid
Melting point	124 °C (255 °F; 397 K) (monohydrate)
Solubility in water	good

Hazards
- GHS labelling
Pictograms	(GHS05: Corrosive) (GHS07: Exclamation mark)
Signal word	Danger
Hazard statements	H302, H314
Precautionary statements	P260, P264, P270, P280, P301+P312, P301+P330+P331, P303+P361+P353, P304+P340, P305+P351+P338, P310, P321, P330, P363, P405, P501
- Except where otherwise noted, data are given for materials in their standard state (at 25 °C [77 °F], 100 kPa). Infobox references

Naphthalene-2-sulfonic acid is an organic compound with the formula C_{10}H_{7}SO_{3}H. A colorless, water-soluble solid, it is often available as the mono- and trihydrates C_{10}H_{7}SO_{3}H^{.}2H_{2}O. It is one of two monosulfonic acids of naphthalene, the other being naphthalene-1-sulfonic acid. The compound is mainly used in the production of dyes via nitration en route to aminonaphthalenesulfonic acids. The compound is prepared by sulfonation of naphthalene with sulfuric acid, however under equilibrating conditions that allow the 1-sulfonic acid isomer to convert to the more stable 2-sulfonic acid.

Naphthalene-2-sulfonic acid undergoes many reactions, some of which are or were of commercial interest. Fusion with sodium hydroxide followed by acidification gives 2-naphthol. It is an intermediate in the formation of 2,6-, 2,7- and 1,6-naphthalene disulfonic acids as well as 1,3,6-naphthalenetrisulfonic acid. Naphthalene-2-sulfonic acid condenses with formaldehyde to give polymeric sulfonic acids, they find use as low-grade superplasticizers in concrete.

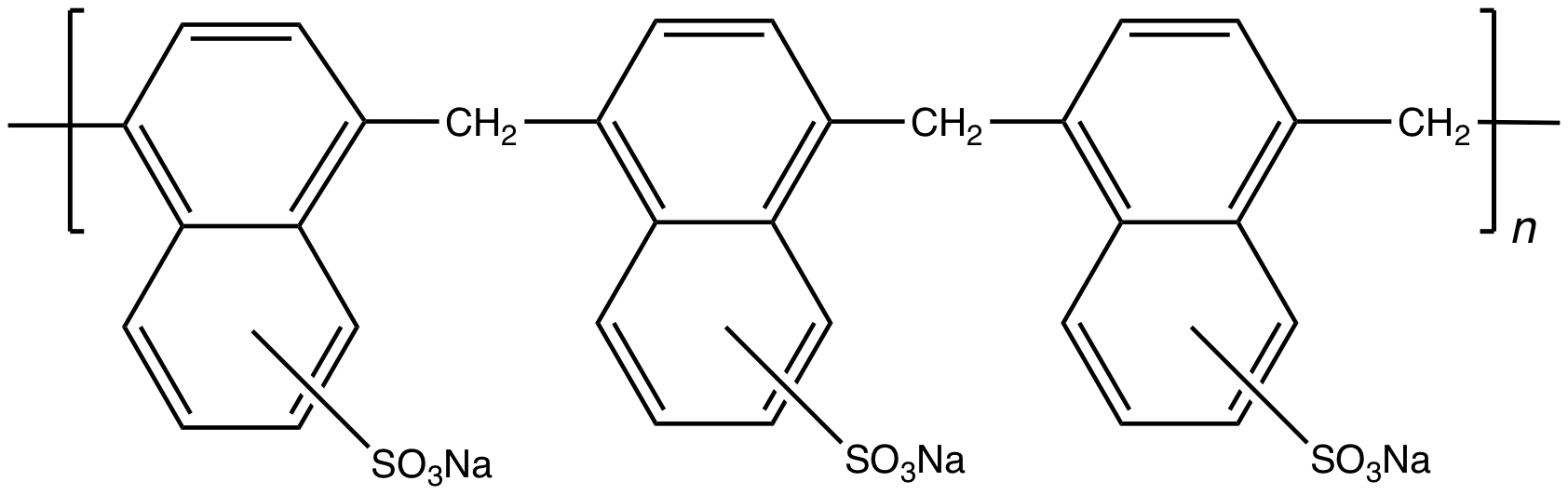
Idealized structure of naphthalenesulfonate/formaldehyde polymer used as a superplasticizer
