= Schizophyllan =

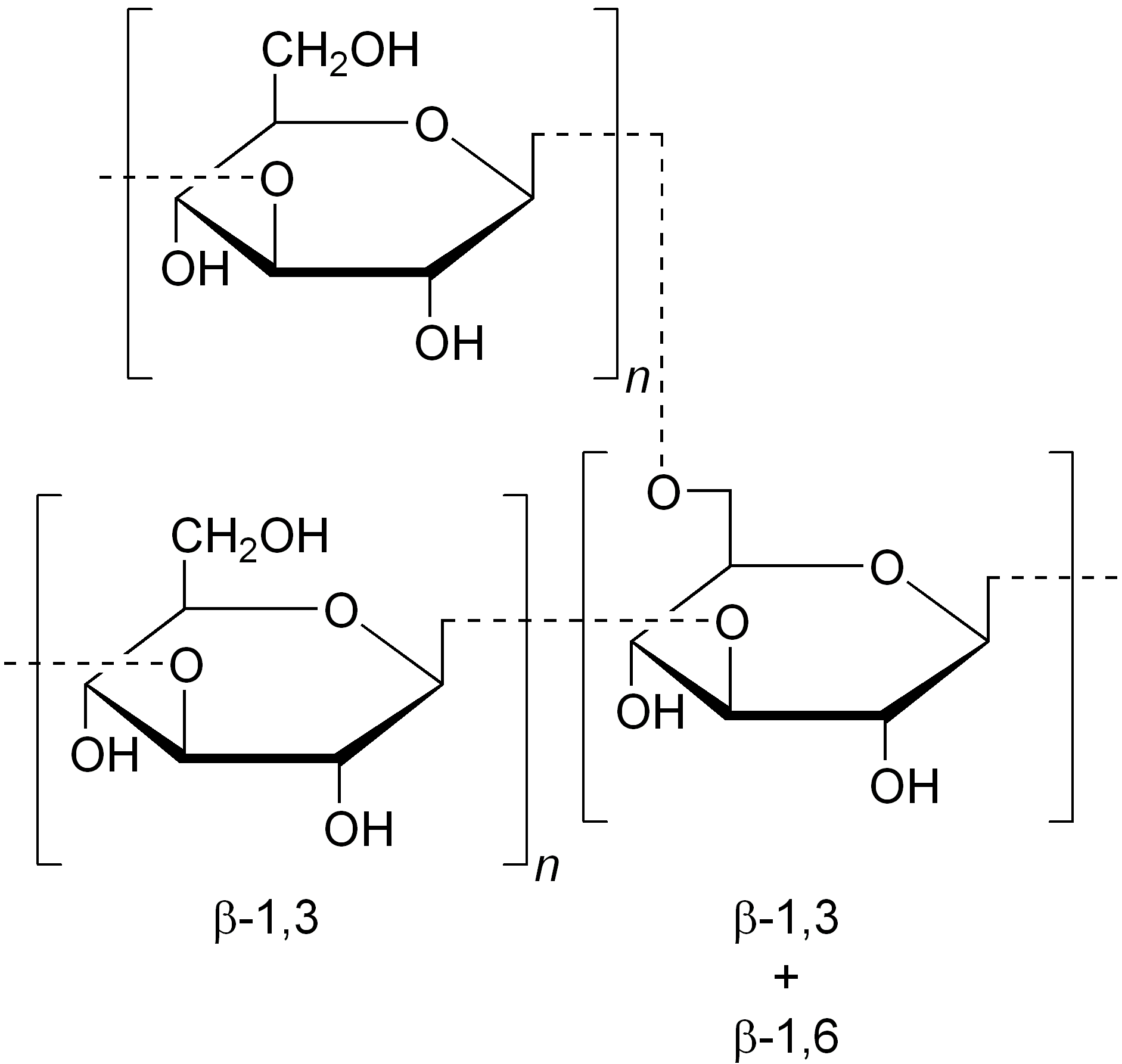

Names
- Other names Sizofiran

Identifiers
CAS Number	9050-67-3
ChemSpider	23163
KEGG	D01535
PubChem CID	7848598
UNII	7F763NNC9X

Properties
Chemical formula	(C_{6}H_{10}O_{5})n
Molar mass	variable
- Except where otherwise noted, data are given for materials in their standard state (at 25 °C [77 °F], 100 kPa). verify (what is ?) Infobox references

Schizophyllan (Sonifilan, SPG) is a neutral extracellular polysaccharide produced by the fungus Schizophyllum commune. Schizophyllan is a β-glucan with a β-(1→3)-linked backbone and β-(1→6)-linked glucose side chains. Schizophyllan is also known as sizofiran.

Schizophyllan has a molecular weight of 450,000 Da, and a specific rotation in water of +18-24°. A chemically analogous polysaccharide, scleroglucan, is formed by the fungus Athelia rolfsii. Both polysaccharides share the chemical structure of the backbone with curdlan. It is known for several things, including its ability to stimulate the immune system, carry metals in water, aid in delivering drugs, and use in some nanofibers.

== Safety ==
Schizophyllan, classified as a beta-glucan and extracted from the fungus Schizophyllum commune, showed no quantifiable adverse reactions through independent scientific procedures. With its classification as a beta-glucan, schizophyllan is generally recognized as safe (GRAS) by the United States FDA. While no distinction has been made specifically for schizophyllan, schizophyllan and other β-glucans have been orally administered safely in a variety of vertebrate species showing immunomodulation: mice, canines, horses, and humans.

More specifically, in 2012, mushroom-derived beta-glucans were deemed GRAS by direct FDA review. A March 2017 further demonstrates the safety of schizophyllan in horses.

== Processing and efficacy ==
The ability for schizophyllan to produce a physiological response is directly correlated with the extraction process and subsequent processing the compound endures. This theory also coincides with that of other beta-glucans.

High doses of schizophyllan are not the primary determinant of an immunological response. Studies have validated that 10 mg (or less) of a high quality, adequately processed chemically similar beta-glucan is a sufficient dose to elicit a measurable effect on immune cells. In addition, small particle beta-glucans modified to prevent re-aggregation during digestion have the most positive effects on immune potentiation.

Ninety percent of horses with active ulceration treated with a schizophyllan-containing polysaccharide blend showed complete resolution and/or improvement in ulcerative areas, increased appetite, weight gain, and positive behavioral changes.

== Cosmetic uses ==
Schizophyllan is used as an ingredient in skin-care formulations.
