= Naphthalenesulfonic acid =

Naphthalenesulfonic acid may refer to:

- Naphthalene-1-sulfonic acid
- Naphthalene-2-sulfonic acid
