= Naphthalene-1-sulfonic acid =

Organic chemical compound

Names
- Preferred IUPAC name Naphthalene-1-sulfonic acid
- Other names 1-naphthalenesulfonic acid

Identifiers
CAS Number	85-47-2
3D model (JSmol)	Interactive image
Beilstein Reference	2099069
ChEBI	CHEBI:30895
ChEMBL	ChEMBL1160029
ChemSpider	6553
ECHA InfoCard	100.001.464
EC Number	246-676-2
Gmelin Reference	366290
KEGG	C16201
PubChem CID	6812
UNII	0SJH61WM2J
CompTox Dashboard (EPA)	DTXSID7048033
- InChI: InChI=1S/C10H8O3S/c11-14(12,13)10-7-3-5-8-4-1-2-6-9(8)10/h1-7H,(H,11,12,13) Key: PSZYNBSKGUBXEH-UHFFFAOYSA-N
- SMILES: C1=CC=C2C(=C1)C=CC=C2S(=O)(=O)O

Properties
Chemical formula	C_{10}H_{8}O_{3}S
Molar mass	208.23 g·mol^{−1}
Appearance	white solid
Melting point	139–140 °C (282–284 °F; 412–413 K)
Solubility in water	good

Hazards
- GHS labelling
Pictograms	(GHS05: Corrosive) (GHS07: Exclamation mark) (GHS08: Health hazard) (GHS09: Environmental hazard)
Signal word	Danger
Hazard statements	H302, H314, H351, H411
Precautionary statements	P201, P202, P260, P264, P270, P273, P280, P281, P301+P312, P301+P330+P331, P303+P361+P353, P304+P340, P305+P351+P338, P308+P313, P310, P321, P330, P363, P391, P405, P501
- Except where otherwise noted, data are given for materials in their standard state (at 25 °C [77 °F], 100 kPa). Infobox references

Naphthalene-1-sulfonic acid is an organic compound with the formula C_{10}H_{7}SO_{3}H. A colorless, water-soluble solid, it is often available as the dihydrate C_{10}H_{7}SO_{3}H^{.}2H_{2}O. It is one of two monosulfonic acids of naphthalene, the other being the more stable naphthalene-2-sulfonic acid. The compound is mainly used in the production of dyes.

Naphthalene-1-sulfonic acid undergoes many reactions, some of which are or were of commercial interest. Upon heating with dilute aqueous acid, it reverts to naphthalene. Fusion with sodium hydroxide followed by acidification gives 1-naphthol. Further sulfonation gives 1,5-naphthalene-disulfonic acid. Reduction with triphenylphosphine gives 1-naphthalenethiol.

A known use of naphthalene-1-sulfonic acid is in the synthesis of B-87836.
