= Exopolymer =

Biopolymer secreted by microorganisms to produce biofilms

An exopolymer is a biopolymer that is secreted by an organism into the environment (i.e. external to the organism). These exopolymers include the biofilms produced by bacteria to anchor them and protect them from environmental conditions. One type of expolymer, Transparent Exopolymers (TEP), found in both marine and aquatic ecosystems, are planktonic acidic polysaccharides of a gel-like consistency, originally defined by their ability to be stained visible by acidic Alcian Blue. Their free-floating characteristic sets TEPs aside from other extracellular polymeric substance subgroups where exopolymers exists as cell coating, dissolved slime or as part of biofilm matrices.

The formation of Transparent Exopolymer Particles (TEP) is mainly due to the abiotic coagulation of dissolved carbohydrates, which are secreted by phytoplankton communities. TEP have the ability to form larger aggregates because of their strong surface active properties or "stickiness". This particular property of TEP allows them to perform as a glue matrix for other solid particles including detritus.

Transparent Exopolymer Particles (TEP) are also a carbon source for bacteria, playing a significant role in affecting the food web structure and the ocean's carbon cycle. Additionally, the conversion of dissolved organic carbon (DOC) to particulate organic carbon (POC) is an aggregation process that is due to TEP formation.
