= Bicyclo(6.2.0)decapentaene =

Bicyclo[6.2.0]decapentaene

Names
- IUPAC name Bicyclo[6.2.0]deca-1(8),2,4,6,9-pentaene

Identifiers
CAS Number	20455-01-0
3D model (JSmol)	Interactive image
ChemSpider	124091
PubChem CID	140692
UNII	36J7E5NMB2
- InChI: InChI=1S/C10H8/c1-2-4-6-10-8-7-9(10)5-3-1/h1-8H Key: FPEVLUDJYTXDPD-UHFFFAOYSA-N
- SMILES: C1=CC=CC2=C(C=C1)C=C2

Properties
Chemical formula	C_{10}H_{8}
Molar mass	128.174 g·mol^{−1}
Appearance	red oil
- Except where otherwise noted, data are given for materials in their standard state (at 25 °C [77 °F], 100 kPa). (what is ?) Infobox references

Bicyclo[6.2.0]decapentaene is a bicyclic organic compound and an isomer of naphthalene and azulene.

Whether this substance is an aromatic compound is of interest to researchers. Both the component cyclobutadiene and cyclooctatetraene component rings are antiaromatic, but when fused together the rings counteract each other.

== Formation ==
Bicyclo[6.2.0]decapentaene can be synthesised in a multistep process from bicyclo[4.2.0]octa-3,7-diene-2,5-dione. This is irradiated with ultraviolet producing a tricyclo decadiendione. This is then reduced to a diol with lithium aluminium hydride. The cis isomer then is converted to a tetraene by adding bromide or mesylate and then stripping it with potassium tert-butoxide. The tricyclodecatetraene has two four carbon rings fused to a hexadiene ring. When this is heated to 100 °C in benzene it converts to bicyclo[6.2.0]decapentaene, losing one bridge to form a cyclooctatetraene ring. Another synthesis starts from octalene.

== Properties ==
Bicyclo[6.2.0]decapentaene has the appearance of orange-red crystals when solid at −78 °C. In standard conditions it is a liquid red-orange oil. Bicyclo[6.2.0]decapentaene dissolves in pentane. Bicyclo[6.2.0]decapentaene reacts with oxygen in air. When heated to 100 °C it dimerizes by converting to a yellow oil that consists of three eight member unsaturated rings, an isomer of cyclooct[c]octalene.

Bicyclo[6.2.0]decapentaene has, on average, a planar structure at room temperature. However, with minimal energy it can adopt a tub shape where opposite sides of the ring are bent up in the same direction. The barrier to being non-planar is very low at 0.6 kcal/mol, so at standard conditions the ring is on average flat. Unlike aromatic compounds, it has alternating bond lengths in the rings. One double bond is in the exclusive part of the four member ring (from carbon 9 to 10) and four double bonds are in the eight-member ring, at positions 1,3,5 and 7. The bridging bond between carbon 1 and 8 is unusually long. This bond has a π bond order of 0.1. It may appear to follow Hückel's rule, but MMP2 calculations predict that it is anti-aromatic, with a resonance energy of -4.0 kcal/mol. By contrast, HF/STO-3g and MNDOC calculations predict that it is slightly aromatic. Bicyclo[6.2.0]decapentaene appears to have both rings acting independently, rather than as an aromatic whole 4n+2 π electron system.

== Derivatives ==
Bicyclo[6.2.0]decapentaene forms a complex with iron tricarbonyl. This has violet crystals and melts around 74-75 °C.

Derivatives are known with side chains attached. One example is 9,10-diphenyl bicyclo[6.2.0]decapentaene.

== Extra reading ==
- Oda, M. (1 January 1986). "Novel polycyclic conjugated compounds containing eight-membered ring: on the aromaticity of [4n]annuleno[4n]annulenes". Pure and Applied Chemistry. 58 (1): 7–14. Bibcode:1986PApCh..58....7O. doi:10.1351/pac198658010007. S2CID 55898167. (includes more derivatives)
