= 1-Naphthalenethiol =

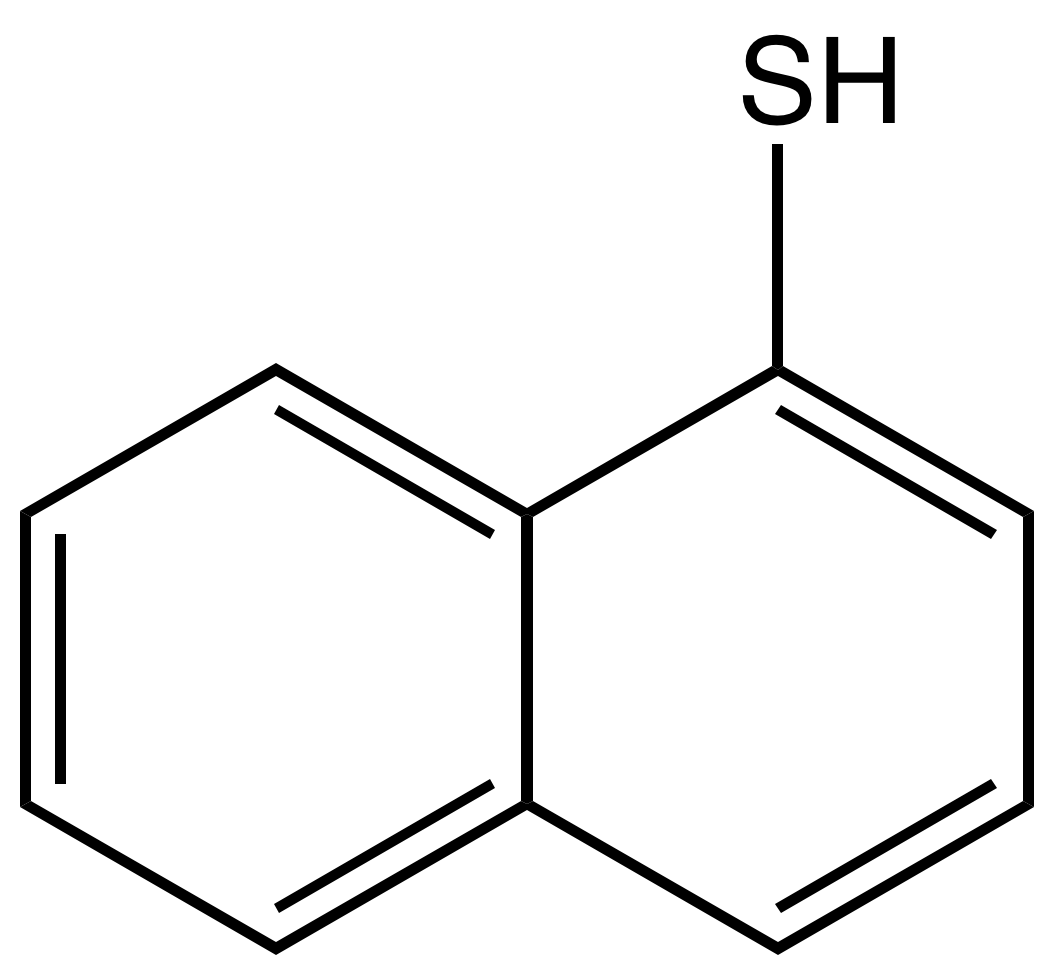

Names
- Preferred IUPAC name Naphthalene-1-thiol
- Other names 1-Mercaptonaphthalene, 1-Naphthyl mercaptan

Identifiers
CAS Number	529-36-2
3D model (JSmol)	Interactive image
ChemSpider	61557
ECHA InfoCard	100.007.694
EC Number	208-462-7
PubChem CID	68259
UNII	9A78CP495H
CompTox Dashboard (EPA)	DTXSID6060185
- InChI: InChI=1S/C10H8S/c11-10-7-3-5-8-4-1-2-6-9(8)10/h1-7,11H Key: SEXOVMIIVBKGGM-UHFFFAOYSA-N
- SMILES: C1=CC=C2C(=C1)C=CC=C2S

Properties
Chemical formula	C_{10}H_{8}S
Molar mass	160.23 g·mol^{−1}
Appearance	colorless oil
Density	1.158 g/mL
Melting point	15 °C (59 °F; 288 K)
Boiling point	285 °C (545 °F; 558 K)

Hazards
- GHS labelling
Pictograms	(GHS07: Exclamation mark)
Signal word	Warning
Hazard statements	H302
Precautionary statements	P264, P270, P301+P312, P330, P501
- Except where otherwise noted, data are given for materials in their standard state (at 25 °C [77 °F], 100 kPa). Infobox references

1-Naphthalenethiol is an organosulfur compound with the formula C_{10}H_{7}SH. It is a white solid. It is one of two monothiols of naphthalene, the other being 2-naphthalenethiol.

== Synthesis ==
A practical synthesis involves the tin/HCl-reduction of the naphthalene-1-sulfonyl chloride. 1-Naphthalenethiol can also be prepared from 1-bromonaphthalene by Pd-catalyzed reaction with the silylthiolate ^{i}Pr_{3}SiSK followed by hydrolysis of the silathioether. It was first prepared from the Grignard reagent generated from 1-bromonaphthalene. Treatment of that reagent with elemental sulfur followed by acidification gave the compound. It has been produced by the iodine-catalyzed reduction of 1-naphthalenesulfonic acid with triphenylphosphine.

== Reactions ==
Treating 1-naphthalenethiol with butyl lithium in the presence of tmeda affords the 2-lithio derivative.
