= Muscodor albus =

Scientific classification
- Domain: Eukaryota
- Kingdom: Fungi
- Division: Ascomycota
- Class: Sordariomycetes
- Order: Xylariales
- Family: Xylariaceae
- Genus: Muscodor
- Species: M. albus

Binomial name
- Muscodor albus Worapong, Strobel & W.M. Hess

Species of fungus

Muscodor albus is a plant-dwelling fungus in the family Xylariaceae. It was first discovered in the bark of a cinnamon tree in Honduras. It has the ability to produce a mixture of volatile compounds, including alcohols and esters, which can kill pathogens like molds and bacteria such as listeria and salmonella and many plant pathogens. It also acts as an insecticide, killing potato tuber moths, codling moths and their larvae.

Researchers at the Agricultural Research Service investigated the antimicrobial effects of Muscodor albus on Botrytis cinerea, which causes the common grey mold found on table grapes. Researchers found that Muscodor albus reduces the occurrence of Botrytis cinerea up to 85% on table grapes. Utilizing Muscodor albus' antimicrobial effects is ideal for organic farmers who suffer a loss in yield due to the grey mold, which is usually treated with sulfur dioxide. Other isolates considered to be varieties of M. albus have been identified in Thailand, on Myristica fragrans, and in Australia's Northern Territory, on plants such as Grevillea pterifolia, Kennedia nigriscans and Terminalia prostrata.

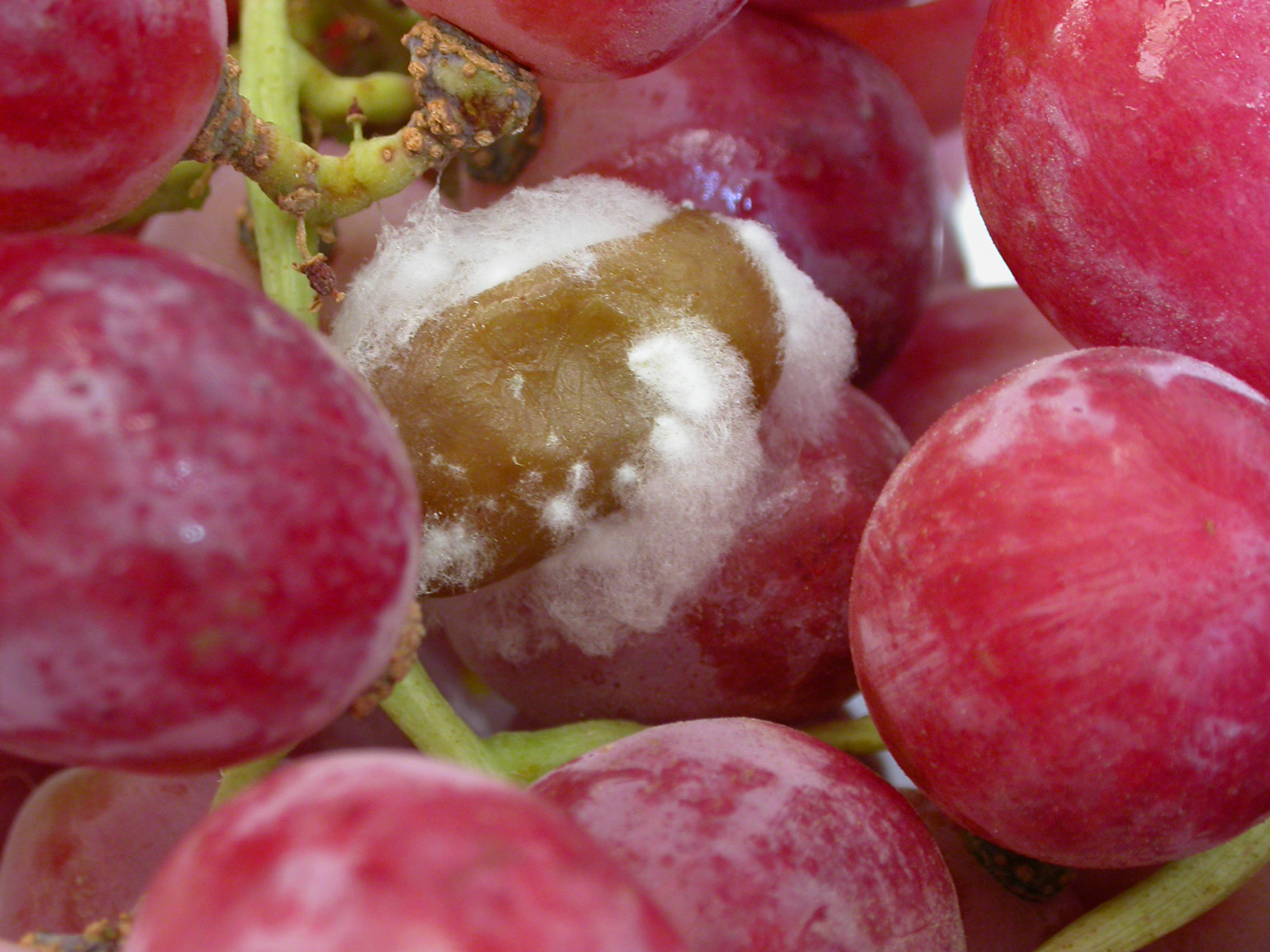
Muscodor albus fungi produces chemicals that inhibit the growth of grey mold Botrytis cinerea (pictured) on table grapes
