= Naphthalene =

Skeletal formula and numbering system of naphthalene
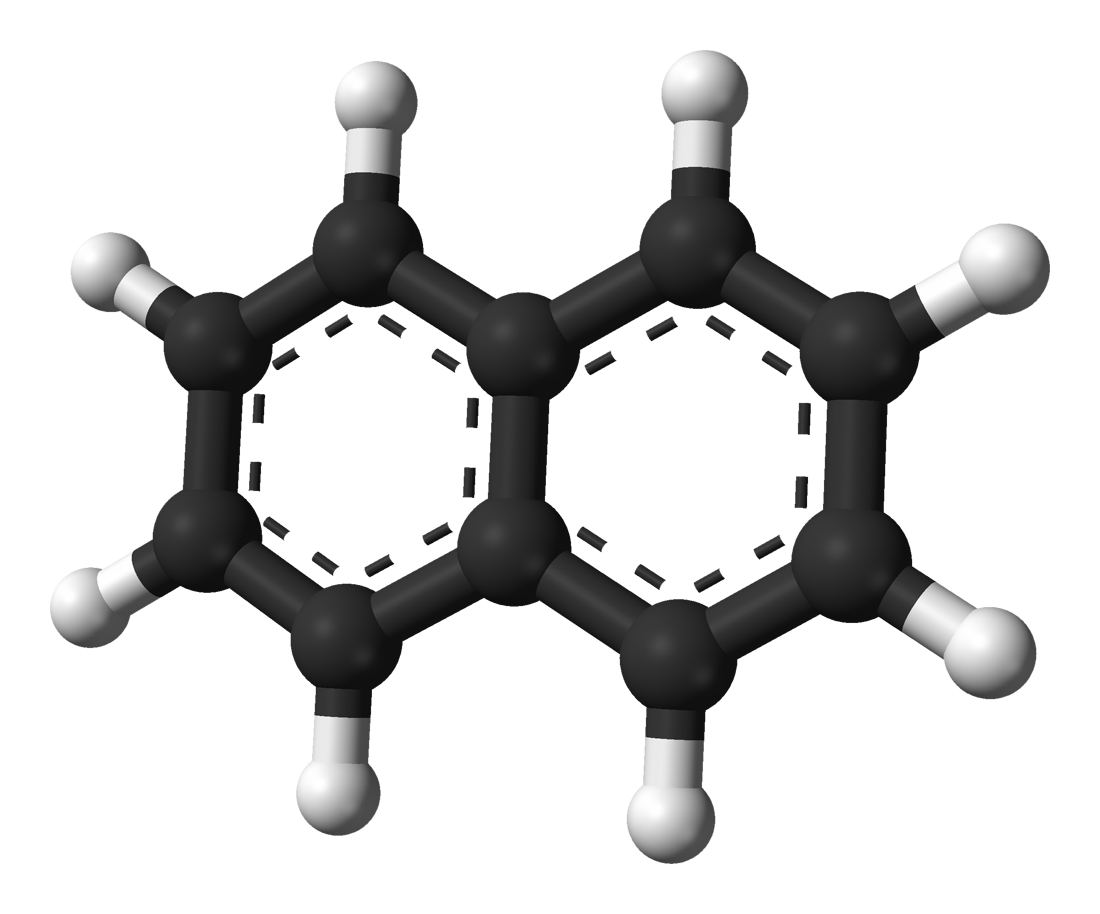
Ball-and-stick model of naphthalene
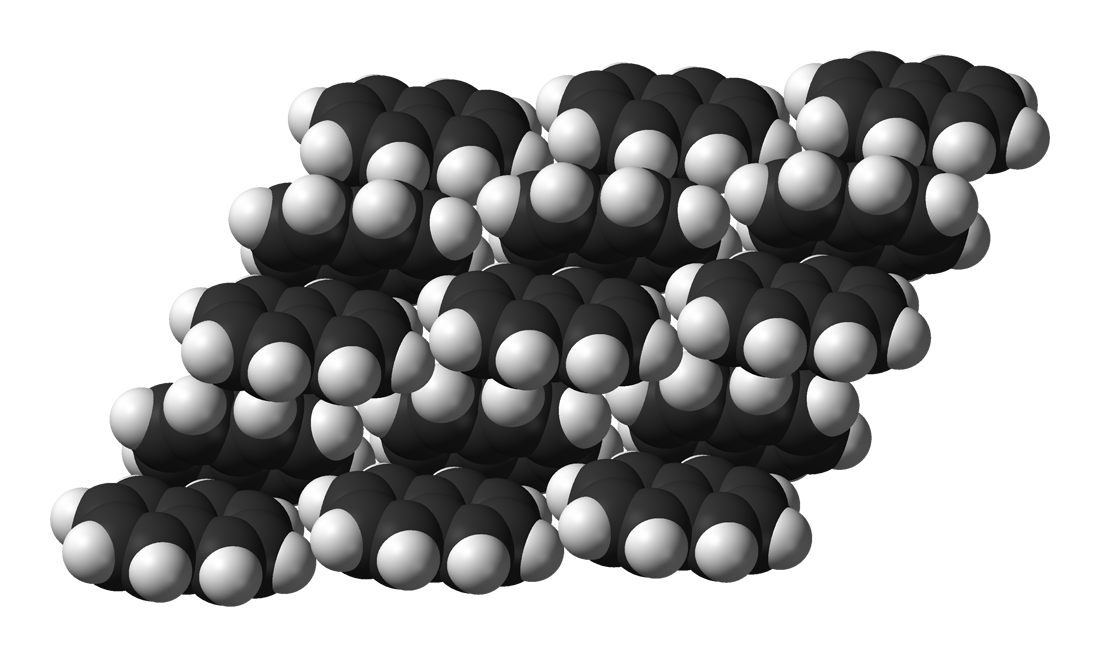
- Unit cells of naphthalene

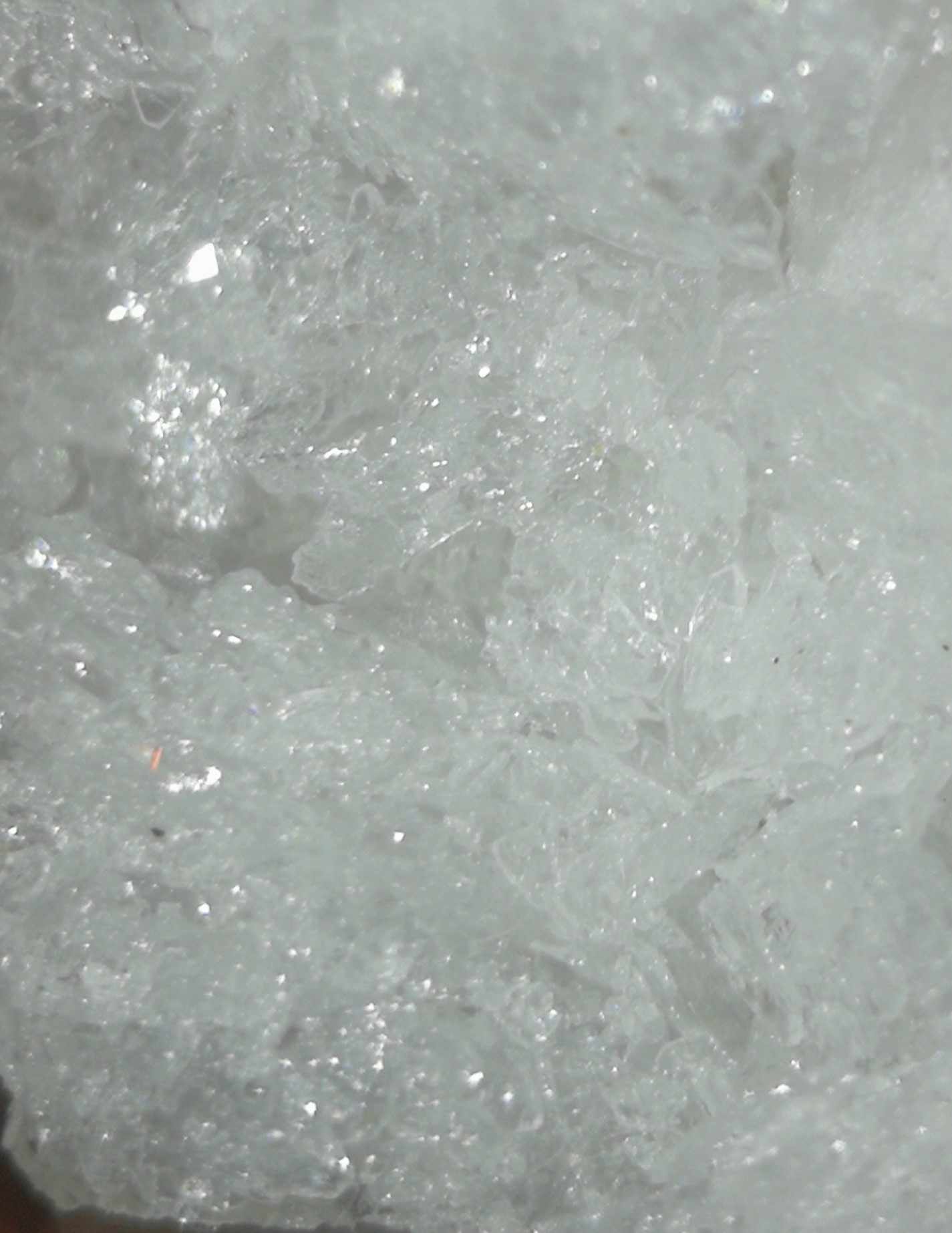
- Naphthalene crystals

Names
- Preferred IUPAC name Naphthalene
- Other names: antimite; albocarbon; camphor tar, white tar; hexalene; mothballs, moth flakes; napthaline

Identifiers
CAS Number	91-20-3
3D model (JSmol)	Interactive image
Beilstein Reference	1421310
ChEBI	CHEBI:16482
ChEMBL	ChEMBL16293
ChemSpider	906
ECHA InfoCard	100.001.863
EC Number	202-049-5
Gmelin Reference	3347
KEGG	C00829
PubChem CID	931
RTECS number	QJ0525000
UNII	2166IN72UN
CompTox Dashboard (EPA)	DTXSID8020913
- InChI: InChI=1S/C10H8/c1-2-6-10-8-4-3-7-9(10)5-1/h1-8H Key: UFWIBTONFRDIAS-UHFFFAOYSA-N; InChI=1/C10H8/c1-2-6-10-8-4-3-7-9(10)5-1/h1-8H Key: UFWIBTONFRDIAS-UHFFFAOYAC
- SMILES: c1c2ccccc2ccc1

Properties
Chemical formula	C_{10}H_{8}
Molar mass	128.174 g·mol^{−1}
Appearance	White solid crystals / flakes
Odor	Strong odor of coal tar or mothballs
Density	1.145 g/cm^{3} (15.5 °C (59.9 °F)); 1.025 g/cm^{3} (20 °C (68 °F)); 0.963 g/cm^{3} (100 °C (212 °F))
Melting point	80.22 ± 0.09 °C (176.40 ± 0.16 °F; 353.37 ± 0.09 K)
Boiling point	218.0 ± 0.1 °C (424.4 ± 0.2 °F; 491.1 ± 0.1 K)
Critical point (T, P)	748.3±0.4 K, 4.06±0.04 MPa
Solubility in water	19 mg/kg (10 °C (50 °F)); 31.6 mg/kg (25 °C (77 °F)); 82 mg/kg (50 °C (122 °F))
Solubility	Soluble in organic solvents
Solubility in ethanol	5 g/100g (0 °C (32 °F)); 11.3 g/100g (25 °C (77 °F)); 19.5 g/100g (40 °C (104 °F)); 179 g/100g (70 °C (158 °F))
Solubility in acetic acid	6.8 g/100g (6.75 °C (44.15 °F)); 13.1 g/100g (21.5 °C (70.7 °F)); 31.1 g/100g (42.5 °C (108.5 °F)); 111 g/100g (60 °C (140 °F))
Solubility in chloroform	19.5 g/100g (0 °C (32 °F)); 35.5 g/100g (25 °C (77 °F)); 49.5 g/100g (40 °C (104 °F)); 87.2 g/100g (70 °C (158 °F))
Solubility in hexane	5.5 g/100g (0 °C (32 °F)); 17.5 g/100g (25 °C (77 °F)); 30.8 g/100g (40 °C (104 °F)); 78.8 g/100g (70 °C (158 °F))
Solubility in butyric acid	13.6 g/100g (6.75 °C (44.15 °F)); 22.1 g/100g (21.5 °C (70.7 °F)); 131.6 g/100g (60 °C (140 °F))
Solubility in seawater	22.8 ppm (salinity 35)
log P	3.34
Vapor pressure	Sublimation pressure: 0.036 Pa (−10 °F; −23 °C); 0.514 Pa (26 °F; −3 °C); 4.918 Pa (62 °F; 17 °C); 34.15 Pa (98 °F; 37 °C); 182.9 Pa (134 °F; 57 °C); 999.6 Pa (176.50 °F; 80.28 °C)
Henry's law constant (k_{H})	0.043 (kPa·m^{3})/mol
Electrical resistivity	≈10^{12} Ω·m
UV-vis (λ_{max})	220 nm (ε_{max} 112,000); 275 nm (ε_{max} 5600); 312 nm (ε_{max} 175)
Electron mobility	0.64(n), 1.50(p) (sign + & –)
Magnetic susceptibility (χ)	−91.9×10^{−6} cm^{3}/mol
Thermal conductivity	98 KPa: 0.1219 W/(m·K) (210.33 °F; 99.07 °C); 0.1174 W/(m·K) (260.73 °F; 127.07 °C); 0.1152 W/(m·K) (293.40 °F; 145.22 °C); 0.1052 W/(m·K) (403.83 °F; 206.57 °C)
Refractive index (n_{D})	1.5898
Viscosity	0.964 cP (80 °C (176 °F)); 0.761 cP (100 °C (212 °F)); 0.217 cP (150 °C (302 °F))

Structure
Crystal structure	Monoclinic
Space group	P2_{1}/b
Point group	C^{5}_{2h}
Lattice constant	a = 8.235 Å, b = 6.003 Å, c = 8.658 Å α = 90°, β = 122.92°, γ = 90°

Thermochemistry (solid)
Heat capacity (C)	165.7 J⋅mol^{−1}⋅K^{−1}
Std molar entropy (S^{⦵}_{298})	167.4 J⋅mol^{−1}⋅K^{−1}
Std enthalpy of formation (Δ_{f}H^{⦵}_{298})	78.5 kJ⋅mol^{−1}
Gibbs free energy (Δ_{f}G^{⦵})	201.6 kJ⋅mol^{−1}
Std enthalpy of combustion (Δ_{c}H^{⦵}_{298})	−5157 kJ⋅mol^{−1}
Enthalpy of fusion (Δ_{f}H^{⦵}_{fus})	19.01 kJ⋅mol^{−1}
Enthalpy of vaporization (Δ_{f}H_{vap})	43.2 kJ⋅mol^{−1}

Thermochemistry (gas)
Heat capacity (C)	131.9 J⋅mol^{−1}⋅K^{−1}
Std molar entropy (S^{⦵}_{298})	333.1 J⋅mol^{−1}⋅K^{−1}
Std enthalpy of formation (Δ_{f}H^{⦵}_{298})	150.6 kJ⋅mol^{−1}
Gibbs free energy (Δ_{f}G^{⦵})	224.1 kJ⋅mol^{−1}

Hazards
- Occupational safety and health (OHS/OSH)
Main hazards	Flammable, sensitizer, possible carcinogen, dust can form explosive mixtures with air
- GHS labelling
Pictograms	(GHS02: Flammable) (GHS08: Health hazard) (GHS09: Environmental hazard)
Signal word	Warning
Hazard statements	H228, H351, H410
Precautionary statements	P201, P202, P210, P240, P241, P273, P280, P308+P313, P370+P378, P391, P405, P501
NFPA 704 (fire diamond)	2 2 0
Flash point	79 °C (174 °F; 352 K)
Autoignition temperature	526 °C (979 °F; 799 K)
Explosive limits	0.9%–5.9%
Threshold limit value (TLV)	10 ppm (TWA)
- Lethal dose or concentration (LD, LC)
LD_{50} (median dose)	1800 mg/kg (rat, oral); 1200 mg/kg (guinea pig, oral); 533 mg/kg (mouse, oral)
- NIOSH (US health exposure limits)
PEL (Permissible)	TWA 10 ppm (50 mg/m^{3})
REL (Recommended)	TWA 10 ppm (50 mg/m^{3}); STEL 15 ppm (75 mg/m^{3})
IDLH (Immediate danger)	250 ppm

Related compounds
Related bicyclic hydrocarbons	Azulene; Bicyclo(6.2.0)decapentaene; Decalin; Dialin; Heptalene; Homonaphthalene; Pentalene; Tetralin
Related compounds	1-Naphthol; 2-Naphthol; Anthracene; Fluorene; Tetracene; Lithium naphthalenide; Sodium naphthalenide
- Except where otherwise noted, data are given for materials in their standard state (at 25 °C [77 °F], 100 kPa). verify (what is ?) Infobox references

Naphthalene is an organic compound with the chemical formula C_{10}H_{8}. It is a white crystalline solid with a characteristic odor that is detectable at concentrations as low as 0.08 ppm. As an aromatic hydrocarbon, naphthalene's structure consists of a fused pair of benzene rings, making it a simple and rather symmetrical polycyclic aromatic hydrocarbon (PAH). It is the main ingredient of traditional mothballs.

== History ==
Alexander Garden first reported he had crystalised from the distillate (of coal tar) "a silvery solid that resembled Camphor and Benzoic Acid" in 1819. Further sources credit Garden with the discovery. Two days after Garden's paper was submitted, William Thomas Brande submitted his paper, and John Kidd followed with "a longer and more thorough examination of the same solid, finding that it was composed of carbon and a little hydrogen". Garden and Brande's separate discoveries were both published in 1820. In 1821, John Kidd described many of this substance's properties and the means of its production. He proposed the name naphthaline as it had been derived from a kind of naphtha, a broad term for various volatile, flammable liquid hydrocarbon mixtures, including coal tar. Naphthalene's chemical formula was determined by Michael Faraday in 1826.

The structure of two fused benzene rings was proposed by Emil Erlenmeyer in 1866, and confirmed by Carl Gräbe three years later.

== Structure ==
A naphthalene molecule can be viewed as the fusion of a pair of benzene rings. (In organic chemistry, rings are fused if they share two or more atoms.) The eight carbon atoms that are not shared by the two rings carry one hydrogen atom each. For purpose of the standard IUPAC nomenclature of derived compounds, those eight atoms are numbered 1 through 8 in sequence around the perimeter of the molecule, starting with a carbon atom adjacent to a shared one. The shared carbon atoms are labeled 4a (between 4 and 5) and 8a (between 8 and 1).

The molecule is planar, like benzene. Unlike benzene, the carbon–carbon bonds in naphthalene are not of the same length. The bonds C1−C2, C3−C4, C5−C6 and C7−C8 are about 1.37 Å (137 pm) in length, whereas the other carbon–carbon bonds are about 1.42 Å (142 pm) long. This difference, established by X-ray diffraction, is consistent with the valence bond model in naphthalene and in particular, with the theorem of cross-conjugation. This theorem would describe naphthalene as an aromatic benzene unit bonded to a diene but not extensively conjugated to it (at least in the ground state), which is consistent with two of its three resonance structures.

Because of this resonance, the molecule has bilateral symmetry across the plane of the shared carbon pair, as well as across the plane that bisects bonds C2-C3 and C6-C7, and across the plane of the carbon atoms. Thus there are two sets of equivalent hydrogen atoms: the alpha positions, numbered 1, 4, 5, and 8, and the beta positions, 2, 3, 6, and 7. Two isomers are then possible for mono-substituted naphthalenes, corresponding to substitution at an alpha or beta position.

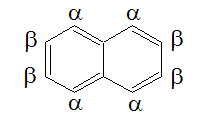

Structural isomers of naphthalene that have two fused aromatic rings include azulene, which has a 5–7 fused ring system, and bicyclo[6.2.0]decapentaene which has a fused 4–8 ring system.

=== Electrical conductivity ===
Pure crystalline naphthalene is a moderate insulator at room temperature, with resistivity of about 10^{12} Ω·m. The resistivity drops more than a thousandfold on melting, to about 4×10^{8} Ω·m. Both in the liquid and in the solid, the resistivity depends on temperature as:

ρ = ρ_{0} × expE/kT

Where ρ_{0} (Ω·m) and (eV) are constant parameters, k is the Boltzmann constant (8.617×10^{−5} eV/K), and T is absolute temperature (K). The parameter E is 0.73 in the solid. However, the solid shows semiconducting character below 100 K (−280 °F; −173 °C).

== Chemical properties ==
=== Reactions with electrophiles ===
In electrophilic aromatic substitution reactions, naphthalene reacts more readily than benzene. For example, chlorination and bromination of naphthalene proceeds without a catalyst to give 1-chloronaphthalene and 1-bromonaphthalene, respectively. Likewise, whereas both benzene and naphthalene can be alkylated using Friedel–Crafts reaction conditions, naphthalene can also be easily alkylated by reaction with alkenes or alcohols, using sulfuric or phosphoric acid catalysts.

Anhydrous aluminium chloride reacts with naphthalene to give a polymer, in which one ring of each naphthalene monomer loses aromaticity, linking to the other monomers at the 1 and 4 positions.

In terms of regiochemistry, electrophiles attack at the alpha position. The selectivity for alpha over beta substitution can be rationalized in terms of the resonance structures of the intermediate: for the alpha substitution intermediate, seven resonance structures can be drawn, of which four preserve an aromatic ring. For beta substitution, the intermediate has only six resonance structures, and only two of these are aromatic. Sulfonation gives the "alpha" product naphthalene-1-sulfonic acid as the kinetic product but naphthalene-2-sulfonic acid as the thermodynamic product. The 1-isomer forms predominantly at 25 °C (77 °F), and the 2-isomer at 160 °C (320 °F). Sulfonation to give the 1- and 2-sulfonic acid occurs readily:

H_{2}SO_{4} + C_{10}H_{8} → C_{10}H_{7}SO_{3}H + H_{2}O

Further sulfonation give di-, tri-, and tetrasulfonic acids.

=== Reduction and oxidation ===
With alkali metals, naphthalene forms the dark blue-green radical anion salts such as sodium naphthalenide, Na^{+}[C_{10}H_{8}]^{−}. The naphthalene anions are strong reducing agents.

Naphthalene can be hydrogenated under high pressure in the presence of metal catalysts to give tetralin (C_{10}H_{12}). Further hydrogenation yields decalin (C_{10}H_{18}).

Oxidation with O_{2} in the presence of vanadium pentoxide (V_{2}O_{5}) as catalyst gives phthalic anhydride:

C_{10}H_{8} + 4.5 O_{2} → C_{6}H_{4}(CO)_{2}O + 2 CO_{2} + 2 H_{2}O

This reaction is the basis of the main use of naphthalene. Oxidation can also be effected using conventional stoichiometric chromate or permanganate reagents.

== Production ==
Glass jar of naphthalene "crystallized from alcohol" at the Delaware County Institute of Science

From the 1960s until the 1990s, significant amounts of naphthalene were produced from heavy petroleum fractions during refining, but present-day production is mainly from coal tar. As of 2023, the global naphthalene market was 2.25 million tons.

Naphthalene is the most abundant single component of coal tar. The composition of coal tar varies with coal type and processing, but typical coal tar is about 10% naphthalene by weight. In industrial practice, distillation of coal tar yields an oil containing about 50% naphthalene, along with twelve other aromatic compounds. This oil, after being washed with aqueous sodium hydroxide to remove acidic components (chiefly various phenols), and with sulfuric acid to remove basic components, undergoes fractional distillation to isolate naphthalene. The crude naphthalene resulting from this process is about 95% naphthalene by weight. The chief impurities are the sulfur-containing aromatic compound benzothiophene (under 2%), indane (0.2%), indene (under 2%), and methylnaphthalene (under 2%). Petroleum-derived naphthalene is usually purer than that derived from coal tar. Where required, crude naphthalene can be further purified by recrystallization from any of a variety of solvents, resulting in 99% naphthalene by weight, referred to as 80 °C (176 °F) (melting point).

=== Other sources and occurrences ===
Naphthalene and its alkyl homologs are the major constituents of creosote.

Trace amounts of naphthalene are produced by magnolias and some species of deer, as well as the Formosan subterranean termite, possibly produced by the termite as a repellant against "ants, poisonous fungi and nematode worms". Some strains of the endophytic fungus Muscodor albus produce naphthalene among a range of volatile organic compounds, while Muscodor vitigenus produces naphthalene almost exclusively.

== Uses ==
Naphthalene is used mainly as a precursor to derivative chemicals. The single largest use of naphthalene is the industrial production of phthalic anhydride, although more phthalic anhydride is made from o-xylene.

=== Fumigant ===
Naphthalene has been used as a fumigant. It was once the primary ingredient in mothballs, although its use has largely been replaced in favor of alternatives such as 1,4-dichlorobenzene. In a sealed container containing naphthalene pellets, naphthalene vapors build up to levels toxic to both the adult and larval forms of many moths that attack textiles. Other fumigant uses of naphthalene include use in soil as a fumigant pesticide, in attic spaces to repel insects and animals such as possums, and in museum storage-drawers and cupboards to protect the contents from attack by insect pests.

=== Solvent ===
Molten naphthalene provides an excellent solubilizing medium for poorly soluble aromatic compounds. In many cases it is more efficient than other high-boiling solvents, such as dichlorobenzene, benzonitrile, nitrobenzene and durene. The reaction of C_{60} with anthracene is conveniently conducted in refluxing naphthalene to give the 1:1 Diels–Alder adduct. The aromatization of hydroporphyrins has been achieved using a solution of 2,3-dichloro-5,6-dicyano-1,4-benzoquinone (DDQ) in naphthalene.

==== Sulfonic acids and sulfonates ====
Many naphthalenesulfonic acids and sulfonates are useful. Naphthalenesulfonic acids are used in the synthesis of 1-naphthol and 2-naphthol, precursors for various dyestuffs, pigments, rubber processing chemicals and other chemicals and pharmaceuticals. They are also used as dispersants in synthetic and natural rubbers, in agricultural pesticides, in dyes, and in lead–acid battery plates. Naphthalenedisulfonic acids such as Armstrong acid are used as precursors and to form pharmaceutical salts such as CFT naphthalenedisulfonate.

The aminonaphthalenesulfonic acids are precursors for synthesis of many synthetic dyes.

Alkyl naphthalene sulfonates (ANS) are used in many industrial applications as nondetergent surfactants (wetting agents) that effectively disperse colloidal systems in aqueous media. The major commercial applications are in the agricultural chemical industry, which uses ANS for wettable powder and wettable granular (dry-flowable) formulations, and in the textile and fabric industry, which uses the wetting and defoaming properties of ANS for bleaching and dyeing operations.

Some naphthalenesulfonate polymers are superplasticizers used for the production of high strength concrete as well as water reducers in the production of gypsum wallboard.

They are produced by treating naphthalenesulfonic acid with formaldehyde, followed by neutralization with sodium hydroxide or calcium hydroxide.

==== Other derivative uses ====
Propranolol is a beta blocker.

Many azo dyes are produced from naphthalene. Useful agrichemicals include naphthoxyacetic acids.

Hydrogenation of naphthalene gives tetrahydronaphthalene (tetralin) and decahydronaphthalene (decalin), which are used as low-volatility solvents. Tetralin is used as a hydrogen-donor solvent.

Alkylation of naphthalene with propylene gives a mixture of diisopropylnaphthalenes, which are useful as nonvolatile liquids for inks.

Substituted naphthalenes serve as pharmaceuticals such as propranolol (a beta blocker) and nabumetone (a nonsteroidal anti-inflammatory drug).

=== Other uses ===
Several uses stem from naphthalene's high volatility: it is used to create artificial pores in the manufacture of high-porosity grinding wheels; it is used in engineering studies of heat transfer using mass sublimation; and it has been explored as a sublimable propellant for cold gas satellite thrusters.

It is used in daytime pyrotechnics to produce very clear black smoke trails, but because it sublimes the shelf-life of items containing it is poor.

== Health effects ==
Exposure to large amounts of naphthalene may damage or destroy red blood cells, most commonly in people with the inherited condition known as glucose-6-phosphate dehydrogenase (G6PD) deficiency, which approximately 400 million people have. Humans, especially children, have developed the condition known as hemolytic anemia, after ingesting mothballs or deodorant blocks containing naphthalene. Symptoms include fatigue, lack of appetite, restlessness, and pale skin. Exposure to large amounts of naphthalene may cause confusion, nausea, vomiting, diarrhea, blood in the urine, and jaundice (yellow coloration of the skin from dysfunction of the liver).

The US National Toxicology Program (NTP) held an experiment where male and female rats and mice were exposed to naphthalene vapors on weekdays for two years. Both male and female rats exhibited evidence of carcinogenesis with increased incidences of adenoma and neuroblastoma of the nose. Female mice exhibited some evidence of carcinogenesis based on increased incidences of alveolar and bronchiolar adenomas of the lung, while male mice exhibited no evidence of carcinogenesis.

The International Agency for Research on Cancer (IARC) classifies naphthalene as possibly carcinogenic to humans and animals (Group 2B). The IARC also points out that acute exposure causes cataracts in humans, rats, rabbits, and mice; and that hemolytic anemia (described above) can occur in children and infants after oral or inhalation exposure or after maternal exposure during pregnancy. A probable mechanism for the carcinogenic effects of mothballs and some types of air fresheners containing naphthalene has been identified.

=== Regulation ===
Mothballs and other products containing naphthalene have been banned within the EU since 2008.

In China, the use of naphthalene in mothballs is forbidden. Danger to human health and the common use of natural camphor are cited as reasons for the ban.

== See also ==
- Camphor
- List of interstellar and circumstellar molecules
- Wagner-Jauregg reaction (classic naphthalene synthesis)
