= Self-consolidating concrete =

Type of concrete mix

Self-consolidating concrete or self-compacting concrete (SCC) is a concrete mix which has a low yield stress, high deformability, good segregation resistance (prevents separation of particles in the mix), and moderate viscosity (necessary to ensure uniform suspension of solid particles during transportation, placement (without external compaction), and thereafter until the concrete sets).

In everyday terms, when poured, SCC is an extremely fluid mix with the following distinctive practical features – it flows very easily within and around the formwork, can flow through obstructions and around corners ("passing ability"), is close to self-leveling (although not actually self-levelling), does not require vibration or tamping after pouring, and follows the shape and surface texture of a mold (or form) very closely once set. As a result, pouring SCC is also much less labor-intensive compared to standard concrete mixes. Once poured, SCC is usually similar to standard concrete in terms of its setting and curing time (gaining strength), and strength. SCC does not use a high proportion of water to become fluid – in fact SCC may contain less water than standard concretes. Instead, SCC gains its fluid properties from an unusually high proportion of fine aggregate, such as sand (typically 50%), combined with superplasticizers (additives that ensure particles disperse and do not settle in the fluid mix) and viscosity-enhancing admixtures (VEA).

Ordinarily, concrete is a dense, viscous material when mixed, and when used in construction, requires the use of vibration or other techniques (known as compaction) to remove air bubbles (cavitation), and honeycomb-like holes, especially at the surfaces, where air has been trapped during pouring. This kind of air content (unlike that in aerated concrete) is not desired and weakens the concrete if left. However it is laborious and takes time to remove by vibration, and improper or inadequate vibration can lead to undetected problems later. Additionally some complex forms cannot easily be vibrated. Self-consolidating concrete is designed to avoid this problem, and not require compaction, therefore reducing labor, time, and a possible source of technical and quality control issues.

SCC was conceptualized in 1986 by Prof. Okamura at University of Tokyo, Japan, at a time when skilled labor was in limited supply, causing difficulties in concrete-related industries. The first generation of SCC used in North America was characterized by the use of relatively high content of binder as well as high dosages of chemicals admixtures, usually superplasticizer to enhance flowability and stability. Such high-performance concrete had been used mostly in repair applications and for casting concrete in restricted areas. The first generation of SCC was therefore characterized and specified for specialized applications.

SCC can be used for casting heavily reinforced sections, places where there can be no access to vibrators for compaction and in complex shapes of formwork which may otherwise be impossible to cast, giving a far superior surface than conventional concrete. The relatively high cost of material used in such concrete continues to hinder its widespread use in various segments of the construction industry, including commercial construction, however the productivity economics take over in achieving favorable performance benefits and works out to be economical in pre-cast industry. The incorporation of powder, including supplementary cementitious materials and filler, can increase the volume of the paste, hence enhancing deformability, and can also increase the cohesiveness of the paste and stability of the concrete. The reduction in cement content and increase in packing density of materials finer than 80 μm, like fly ash etc. can reduce the water-cement ratio, and the high-range water reducer (HRWR) demand. The reduction in free water can reduce the concentration of viscosity-enhancing admixture (VEA) necessary to ensure proper stability during casting and thereafter until the onset of hardening. It has been demonstrated that a total fine aggregate content ("fines", usually sand) of about 50% of total aggregate is appropriate in an SCC mix.

There are many studies on different types of SCC which address its fresh properties, strength, durability and microstructural properties. Types of self-consolidating concrete include low-fines SCC (LF-SCC) and semi-flowable SCC (SF-SCC) etc. SCC can be produced using different industrial wastes as cement replacing materials. They can be used for pavement construction <2-6>.

Reference: https://doi.org/10.1016/j.conbuildmat.2022.130036

== Overview ==
- SCC is measured using the flow table test (slump-flow test) rather than the usual concrete slump test, as it is too fluid to keep its shape when the cone is removed. A typical SCC mix will have slump-flow of around 500 – 700 mm.
- SCC is weakened, not strengthened, by vibration. As vibration is not needed for compacting the mix, all that it achieves is to separate and segregate it.

== See also ==
- Concrete slump test
- Flow table test
