= Consistometer =

Device for measuring the consistency of semi-liquid foodstuffs

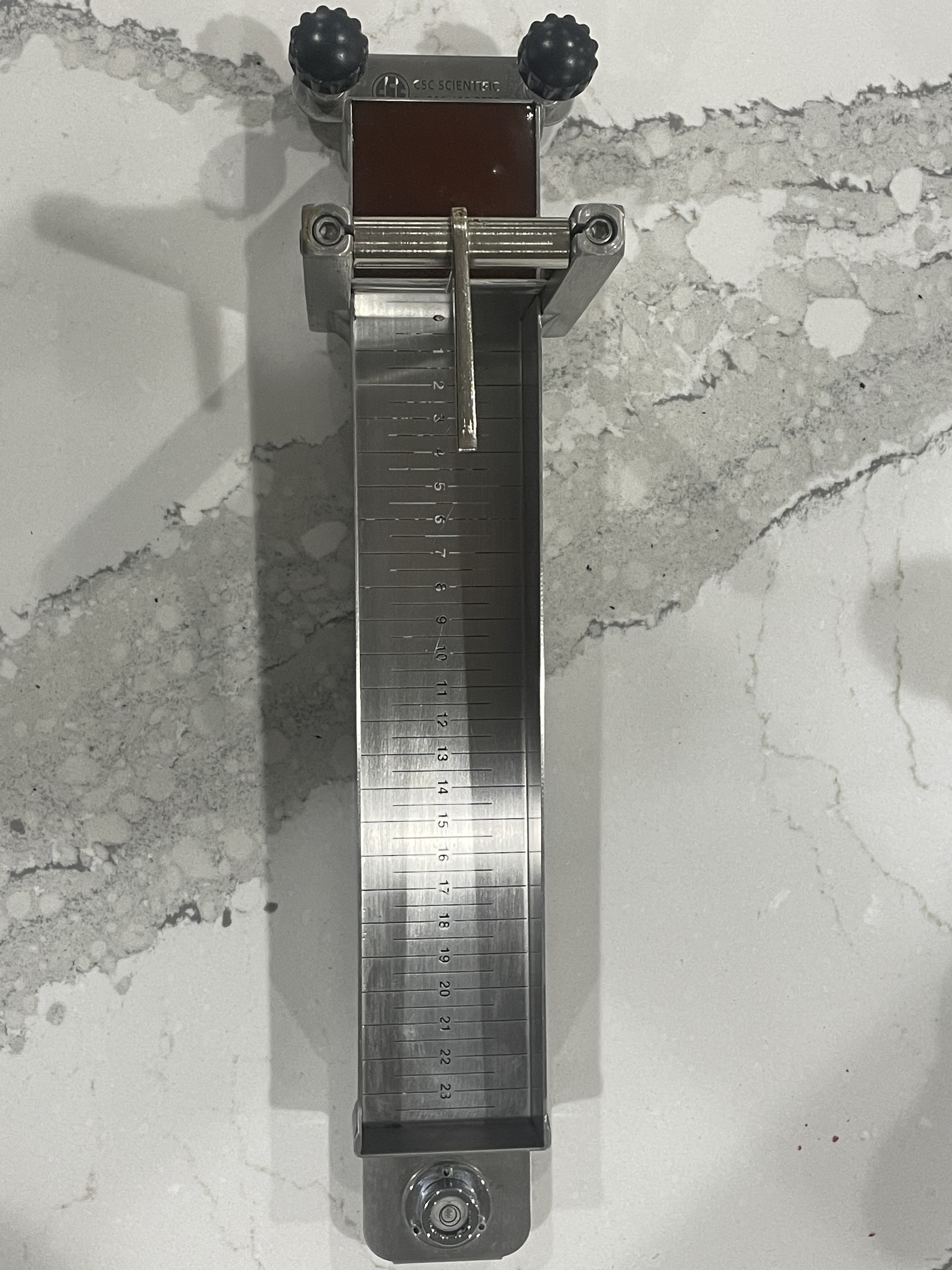
A Bostwick consistometer from the top, barbecue sauce ready to be released and measured

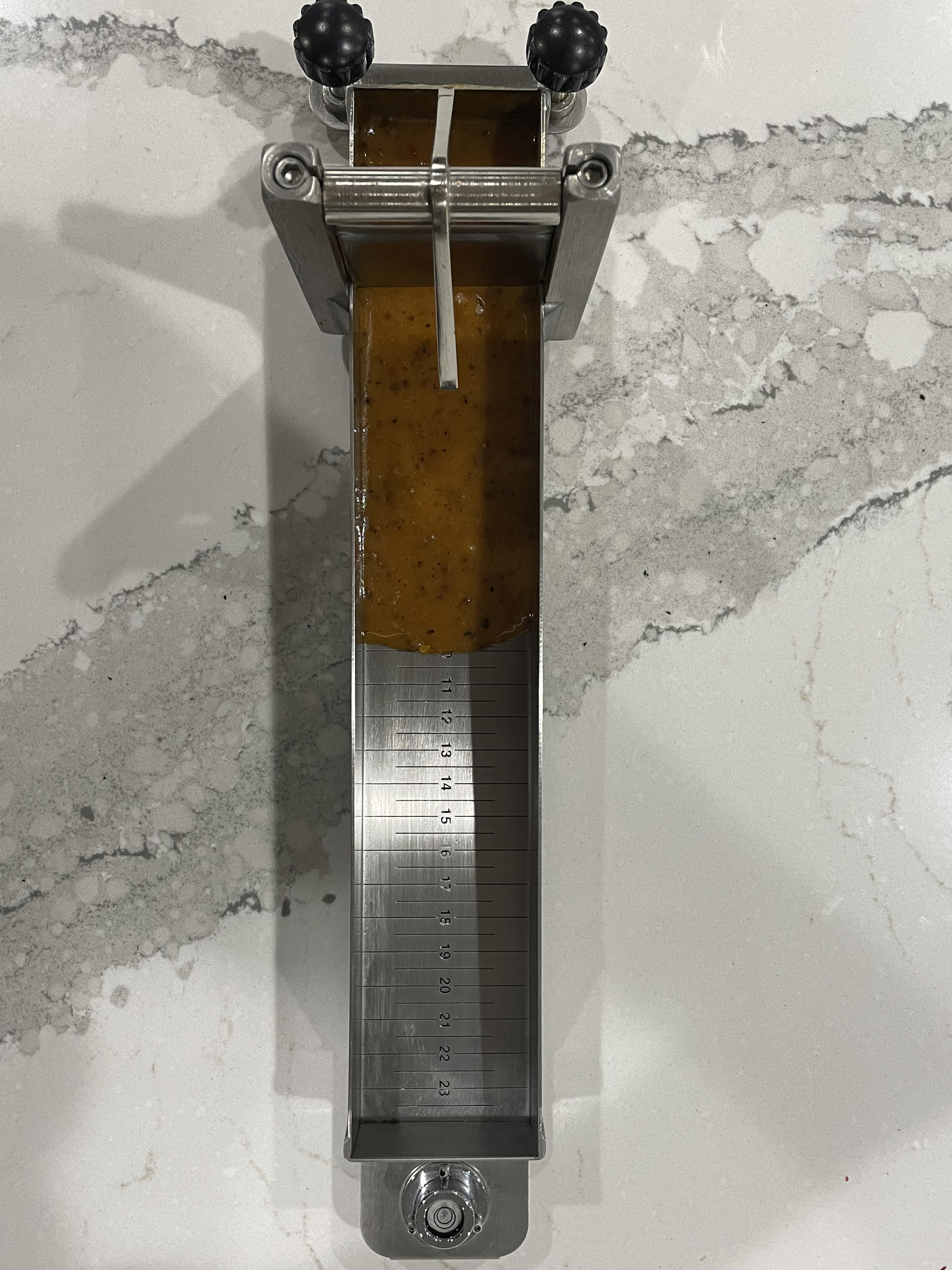
A Bostwick consistometer from the top, the release sprung and barbecue sauce flowing

A consistometer is a device for measuring the physical consistency of a substance. It is most often used for foods such as ketchup and other thick fluids or semi-fluids.

Consistency is typically measured in terms of rate of flow, as opposed to viscosity which is measured in regard to force within units like poise. Consistometry readings can roughly correspond with viscosity measurements, but some substances such as carob flour have little to no effect on consistometer flow but can increase apparent viscosity. People's sensory perception of a food seems to track more with the consistency than the viscosity. Using a consistometer is also useful on non-homogeneous substances that would give poor readings with a viscometer.

One of the most common types is the Bostwick consistometer which was invented by bacteriologist Elmer Patton Bostwick (1893–1958). This device consists of a rectangular container with two sections: one of a set volume and the other at a slight decline with centimeter measurements along the bottom. Dividing the two sections is a sluice gate that can be sprung quickly open, allowing the substance to flow under its own weight. The distance traveled is noted at a specific time, typically thirty seconds, and compared to known samples. A Bostwick consistometer is relatively easy to use in remote locations without electricity and is much cheaper than a viscometer.

Tomato ketchup must be measured with a Bostwick consistometer to be graded in the United States. Grades A and B must be of a "good consistency" and test at 3.0–7.0 centimeters in 30 seconds at 20°C. Grade C will have a "fairly good consistency", which is outside the bounds of "good consistency" and flow 2.0–10.0 centimeters in 30 seconds at 20°C. Other items, such as steak sauce have similar guidelines.

A different type of device is the Adams consistometer, alternately called the Grawemeyer and Pfund Consistometer. This requires a larger sample than the Bostwick does, of around a half liter as opposed to around 100 mL. This makes it better for measuring things like creamed corn. It operates similarly to the Bostwick, but the substrate flows over a flat plate and not just in one direction. The fluid is poured into a cylindrical or slightly conical reservoir centered on a plate, which is lifted to let it flow out. One advantage over the Bostwick is that measurements are taken in four directions and averaged to yield a more robust result. This is a similar set up to that used in a concrete slump test using an Abrams cone, though that measures the vertical difference in slump and not the horizontal flow.

== See also ==
- Angle of repose
- Flow table test
- Thickened fluids
