= Water–cement ratio =

Main parameter determining concrete strength and durability

The water–cement ratio (w/c ratio, or water-to-cement ratio, sometimes also called the Water-Cement Factor, f) is the ratio of the mass of water (w) to the mass of cement (c) used in a concrete mix:

$$f = \frac{\text{mass of water}}{\text{mass of cement}} = \frac{w}{c}$$

The typical values of this ratio f = w/c are generally comprised in the interval 0.40 and 0.60.

The water-cement ratio of the fresh concrete mix is one of the main, if not the most important, factors determining the quality and properties of hardened concrete, as it directly affects the concrete porosity, and a good concrete is always a concrete as compact and as dense as possible. A good concrete must be therefore prepared with as little water as possible, but with enough water to hydrate the cement minerals and to properly handle it.

A lower ratio leads to higher strength and durability, but may make the mix more difficult to work with and form. Workability can be resolved with the use of plasticizers or super-plasticizers. A higher ratio gives a too fluid concrete mix resulting in a too porous hardened concrete of poor quality.

Often, the concept also refers to the ratio of water to cementitious materials, w/cm. Cementitious materials include cement and supplementary cementitious materials such as ground granulated blast-furnace slag (GGBFS), fly ash (FA), silica fume (SF), rice husk ash (RHA), metakaolin (MK), and natural pozzolans. Most of supplementary cementitious materials (SCM) are byproducts of other industries presenting interesting hydraulic binding properties. After reaction with alkalis (GGBFS activation) and portlandite (Ca(OH)_{2}), they also form calcium silicate hydrates (C-S-H), the "gluing phase" present in the hardened cement paste. These additional C-S-H are filling the concrete porosity and thus contribute to strengthen concrete. SCMs also help reducing the clinker content in concrete and therefore saving energy and minimizing costs, while recycling industrial wastes otherwise aimed to landfill.

The effect of the water-to-cement (w/c) ratio onto the mechanical strength of concrete was first studied by René Féret (1892) in France, and then by Duff A. Abrams (1918) (inventor of the concrete slump test) in the USA, and by Jean Bolomey (1929) in Switzerland.

The 1997 Uniform Building Code specifies a maximum of 0.5 w/c ratio when concrete is exposed to freezing and thawing in moist conditions or to de-icing salts, and a maximum of 0.45 w/c ratio for concrete in severe, or very severe, sulfate conditions.

Concrete hardens as a result of the chemical reaction between cement and water (known as hydration and producing heat). For every mass (kilogram, pound, or any unit of weight) of cement (c), about 0.35 mass of water (w) is needed to fully complete the hydration reactions.

However, a fresh concrete with a w/c ratio of 0.35 may not mix thoroughly, and may not flow well enough to be correctly placed and to fill all the voids in the forms, especially in the case of a dense steel reinforcement. More water is therefore used than is chemically and physically necessary to react with cement. Water–cement ratios in the range of 0.40 to 0.60 are typically used. For higher-strength concrete, lower w/c ratios are necessary, along with a plasticizer to increase flowability.

A w/c ratio higher than 0.60 is not acceptable as fresh concrete becomes "soup" and leads to a higher porosity and to very poor quality hardened concrete as publicly stated by Prof. Gustave Magnel (1889-1955, Ghent University, Belgium) during an official address to American building contractors at the occasion of one of his visits in the United States in the 1950s to build the first prestressed concrete girder bridge in the USA: the Walnut Lane Memorial Bridge in Philadelphia open to traffic in 1951. The famous sentence of Gustave Magnel, facing reluctance from a contractor, when he was requiring a very low w/c ratio, zero-slump, concrete for casting the girders of this bridge remains in many memories: "American makes soup, not concrete".

When the excess water added to improve the workability of fresh concrete, and not consumed by the hydration reactions, leaves concrete as it hardens and dries, it results in an increased concrete porosity only filled by air. A higher porosity reduces the final strength of concrete because the air present in the pores is compressible and concrete microstructure can be more easily "crushed".

Moreover, a higher porosity also increases the hydraulic conductivity (K, m/s) of concrete and the effective diffusion coefficients (D_{e}, m^{2}/s) of solutes and dissolved gases in the concrete matrix. This increases water ingress into concrete, accelerates its dissolution (calcium leaching), favors harmful expansive chemical reactions (ASR, DEF), and facilitates the transport of aggressive chemical species such as chlorides (pitting corrosion of reinforced bars) and sulfates (internal and external sulfate attacks, ISA and ESA, of concrete) inside the concrete porosity.

When cementitious materials are used to encapsulate toxic heavy metals or radionuclides, a lower w/c ratio is required to decrease the matrix porosity and the effective diffusion coefficients of the immobilized elements in the cementitious matrix. A lower w/c ratio also contributes to minimize the leaching of the toxic elements out of the immobilization material.

A higher porosity also facilitates the diffusion of gases into the concrete microstructure. A faster diffusion of atmospheric CO_{2} increases the concrete carbonation rate. When the carbonation front reaches the steel reinforcements (rebar), the pH of the concrete pore water at the steel surface decreases. At a pH value lower than 10.5, the carbon steel is no longuer passivated by an alkaline pH and starts to corrode (general corrosion). A faster diffusion of oxygen (O_{2}) into the concrete microstructure also accelerates the rebar corrosion.

Moreover, on the long term, a concrete mix with too much water will experience more creep and drying shrinkage as excess water leaves the concrete porosity, resulting in internal cracks and visible fractures (particularly around inside corners), which again will reduce the concrete mechanical strength.

Finally, water added in excess also facilitates the segregation of fine and coarse aggregates (sand and gravels) from the fresh cement paste and causes the formation of honeycombs (pockets of gravels without hardened cement paste) in concrete walls and around rebar. It also causes water bleeding at the surface of concrete slabs or rafts (with a dusty surface left after water evaporation).

For all the afore mentioned reasons, it is strictly forbidden to add extra water to a ready-mix concrete truck when the delivery time is exceeded, and the concrete becomes difficult to pour because it starts to set. Such diluted concrete immediately loses any official certification and the responsibility of the contractor accepting such a deleterious practice is also engaged. In the worst case, an addition of superplasticizer can be made to increase again the concrete workability and to salvage the content of a ready-mix concrete truck when the maximum concrete delivery time is not exceeded.
