= Properties of concrete =

Concrete has relatively high compressive strength (resistance to breaking when squeezed), but significantly lower tensile strength (resistance to breaking when pulled apart). The compressive strength is typically controlled with the ratio of water to cement when forming the concrete, and tensile strength is increased by additives, typically steel, to create reinforced concrete. In other words we can say concrete is made up of sand (which is a fine aggregate), ballast (which is a coarse aggregate), cement (can be referred to as a binder) and water (which is an additive).

== Reinforced concrete ==
Concrete has relatively high compressive strength, but significantly lower tensile strength. As a result, without compensating, concrete would almost always fail from tensile stresses even when loaded in compression. The practical implication of this is that concrete elements subjected to tensile stresses must be reinforced with materials that are strong in tension (often steel). The elasticity of concrete is relatively constant at low stress levels but starts decreasing at higher stress levels as matrix cracking develops. Concrete has a very low coefficient of thermal expansion, and as it matures concrete shrinks. All concrete structures will crack to some extent, due to shrinkage and tension. Concrete which is subjected to long-duration forces is prone to creep. The density of concrete varies, but is around 2,400 kilograms per cubic metre (150 lb/cu ft).

Reinforced concrete is the most common form of concrete. The reinforcement is often steel rebar (mesh, spiral, bars and other forms). Structural fibers of various materials are available. Concrete can also be prestressed (reducing tensile stress) using internal steel cables (tendons), allowing for beams or slabs with a longer span than is practical with reinforced concrete alone. Inspection of existing concrete structures can be non-destructive if carried out with equipment such as a Schmidt hammer, which is sometimes used to estimate relative concrete strengths in the field.

== Mix design ==
The ultimate strength of concrete is influenced by the water-cementitious ratio (w/cm), the design constituents, and the mixing, placement and curing methods employed. All things being equal, concrete with a lower water-cement (cementitious) ratio makes a stronger concrete than that with a higher ratio. The total quantity of cementitious materials (portland cement, slag cement, pozzolans) can affect strength, water demand, shrinkage, abrasion resistance and density. All concrete will crack independent of whether or not it has sufficient compressive strength. In fact, high Portland cement content mixtures can actually crack more readily due to heat given off during the hydration process. As concrete transforms from its plastic state, hydrating to a solid, the material undergoes shrinkage. Plastic shrinkage cracks can occur soon after placement but if the evaporation rate is high they often can actually occur during finishing operations, for example in hot weather or a breezy day.

In very high-strength concrete mixtures (greater than 70 MPa) the crushing strength of the aggregate can be a limiting factor to the ultimate compressive strength. In lean concretes (with a high water-cement ratio) the crushing strength of the aggregates is not so significant. The internal forces in common shapes of structure, such as arches, vaults, columns and walls are predominantly compressive forces, with floors and pavements subjected to tensile forces. Compressive strength is widely used for specification requirement and quality control of concrete. Engineers know their target tensile (flexural) requirements and will express these in terms of compressive strength.

Wired.com reported on 13 April 2007 that a team from the University of Tehran, competing in a contest sponsored by the American Concrete Institute, demonstrated several blocks of concretes with abnormally high compressive strengths between 340 and 410 MPa (49,000 and 59,000 psi) at 28 days. The blocks appeared to use an aggregate of steel fibres and quartz – a mineral with a compressive strength of 1100 MPa, much higher than typical high-strength aggregates such as granite (100–140 MPa or 15,000–20,000 psi). Reactive powder concrete, also known as ultra-high-performance concrete, can be even stronger, with strengths of up to 800 MPa (116,000 PSI). These are made by eliminating large aggregate completely, carefully controlling the size of the fine aggregates to ensure the best possible packing, and incorporating steel fibers (sometimes produced by grinding steel wool) into the matrix. Reactive powder concretes may also make use of silica fume as a fine aggregate.

== Elasticity ==
The modulus of elasticity of concrete is a function of the modulus of elasticity of the aggregates and the cement matrix and their relative proportions. The modulus of elasticity of concrete is relatively constant at low stress levels but starts decreasing at higher stress levels as matrix cracking develops. The elastic modulus of the hardened paste may be in the order of 10-30 GPa and aggregates about 45 to 85 GPa. The concrete composite is then in the range of 30 to 50 GPa.

The American Concrete Institute allows the modulus of elasticity to be calculated using the following equation:

$E_c=33w_c^{1.5}\sqrt{f'_c}$ (psi)

where

$w_c=$weight of concrete (pounds per cubic foot) and where $90\frac{\textrm{lb}}{\textrm{ft}^3}\leq w_c\leq155\frac{\textrm{lb}}{\textrm{ft}^3}$
$f'_c=$compressive strength of concrete at 28 days (psi)

This equation is completely empirical and is not based on theory. Note that the value of E_{c} found is in units of psi. For normal weight concrete (defined as concrete with a w_{c} of 150 lb/ft^{3} and subtracting 5 lb/ft^{3} for steel) E_{c} is permitted to be taken as $57000\sqrt{f'_c}$.

The publication used by structural bridge engineers is the AASHTO Load and Resistance Factor Design Manual, or "LRFD." From the LRFD, section 5.4.2.4, E_{c} is determined by:

$E_c=33000K_1w_c^{1.5}\sqrt{f'_c}$ (ksi)

where

$K_1=$ correction factor for aggregate source (taken as 1.0 unless determined otherwise)
$w_c=$ weight of concrete (kips per cubic foot), where $0.090\frac{\textrm{kip}}{\textrm{ft}^3}\leq w_c\leq0.155\frac{\textrm{kip}}{\textrm{ft}^3}$ and $f_y\leq15.0\frac{\textrm{kip}}{\textrm{in}^2}$
$f'_c=$ specified compressive strength of concrete at 28 days (ksi)

For normal weight concrete (w_{c}=0.145 kips per cubic feet) E_{c} may be taken as:

$E_c=1820\sqrt{f'_c}$ (ksi)

== Thermal properties ==
=== Expansion and shrinkage ===
Concrete has a very low coefficient of thermal expansion. However, if no provision is made for expansion, very large forces can be created, causing cracks in parts of the structure not capable of withstanding the force or the repeated cycles of expansion and contraction. The coefficient of thermal expansion of Portland cement concrete is 0.000009 to 0.000012 (per degree Celsius) (8 to 12 microstrains/°C)(8-12 1/MK).

=== Thermal Conductivity ===
Concrete has moderate thermal conductivity, much lower than metals, but significantly higher than other building materials such as wood, and is a poor insulator.

A layer of concrete is frequently used for 'fireproofing' of steel structures. However, the term fireproof is inappropriate, for high temperature fires can be hot enough to induce chemical changes in concrete, which in the extreme can cause considerable structural damage to the concrete.

== Cracking ==
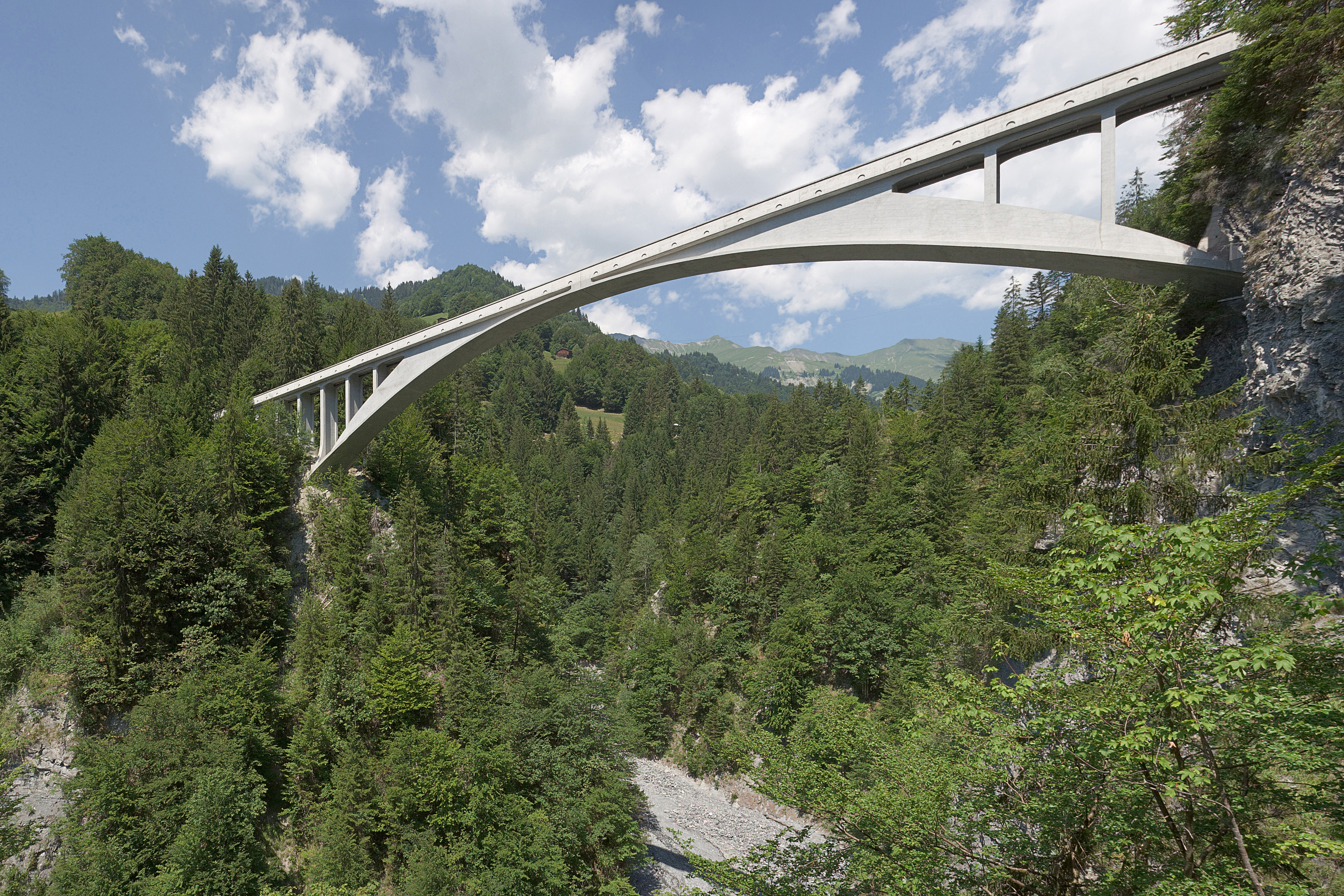
Salginatobel Bridge, Switzerland.

As concrete matures it continues to shrink, due to the ongoing reaction taking place in the material, although the rate of shrinkage falls relatively quickly and keeps reducing over time (for all practical purposes concrete is usually considered to not shrink due to hydration any further after 30 years). The relative shrinkage and expansion of concrete and brickwork require careful accommodation when the two forms of construction interface.

All concrete structures will crack to some extent. One of the early designers of reinforced concrete, Robert Maillart, employed reinforced concrete in a number of arched bridges. His first bridge was simple, using a large volume of concrete. He then realized that much of the concrete was very cracked, and could not be a part of the structure under compressive loads, yet the structure clearly worked. His later designs simply removed the cracked areas, leaving slender, beautiful concrete arches. The Salginatobel Bridge is an example of this.

Concrete cracks due to tensile stress induced by shrinkage or stresses occurring during setting or use. Various means are used to overcome this. Fiber reinforced concrete uses fine fibers distributed throughout the mix or larger metal or other reinforcement elements to limit the size and extent of cracks. In many large structures, joints or concealed saw-cuts are placed in the concrete as it sets to make the inevitable cracks occur where they can be managed and out of sight. Water tanks and highways are examples of structures requiring crack control.

=== Shrinkage cracking ===
Shrinkage cracks occur when concrete members undergo restrained volumetric changes (shrinkage) as a result of either drying, autogenous shrinkage, or thermal effects. Restraint is provided either externally (i.e. supports, walls, and other boundary conditions) or internally (differential drying shrinkage, reinforcement). Once the tensile strength of the concrete is exceeded, a crack will develop. The number and width of shrinkage cracks that develop are influenced by the amount of shrinkage that occurs, the amount of restraint present, and the amount and spacing of reinforcement provided. These are minor indications and have no real structural impact on the concrete member.

Plastic-shrinkage cracks are immediately apparent, visible within 0 to 2 days of placement, while drying-shrinkage cracks develop over time. Autogenous shrinkage also occurs when the concrete is quite young and results from the volume reduction resulting from the chemical reaction of the Portland cement.

=== Tension cracking ===
Concrete members may be put into tension by applied loads. This is most common in concrete beams where a transversely applied load will put one surface into compression and the opposite surface into tension due to induced bending. The portion of the beam that is in tension may crack. The size and length of cracks is dependent on the magnitude of the bending moment and the design of the reinforcing in the beam at the point under consideration. Reinforced concrete beams are designed to crack in tension rather than in compression. This is achieved by providing reinforcing steel which yields before failure of the concrete in compression occurs and allowing remediation, repair, or if necessary, evacuation of an unsafe area.

== Creep ==
Creep is the permanent movement or deformation of a material in order to relieve stresses within the material. Concrete that is subjected to long-duration forces is prone to creep. Short-duration forces (such as wind or earthquakes) do not cause creep. Creep can sometimes reduce the amount of cracking that occurs in a concrete structure or element, but it also must be controlled. The amount of primary and secondary reinforcing in concrete structures contributes to a reduction in the amount of shrinkage, creep and cracking.

== Water retention ==
Portland cement concrete holds water. However, some types of concrete (like Pervious concrete) allow water to pass, hereby being perfect alternatives to Macadam roads, as they do not need to be fitted with storm drains.

== Concrete testing ==
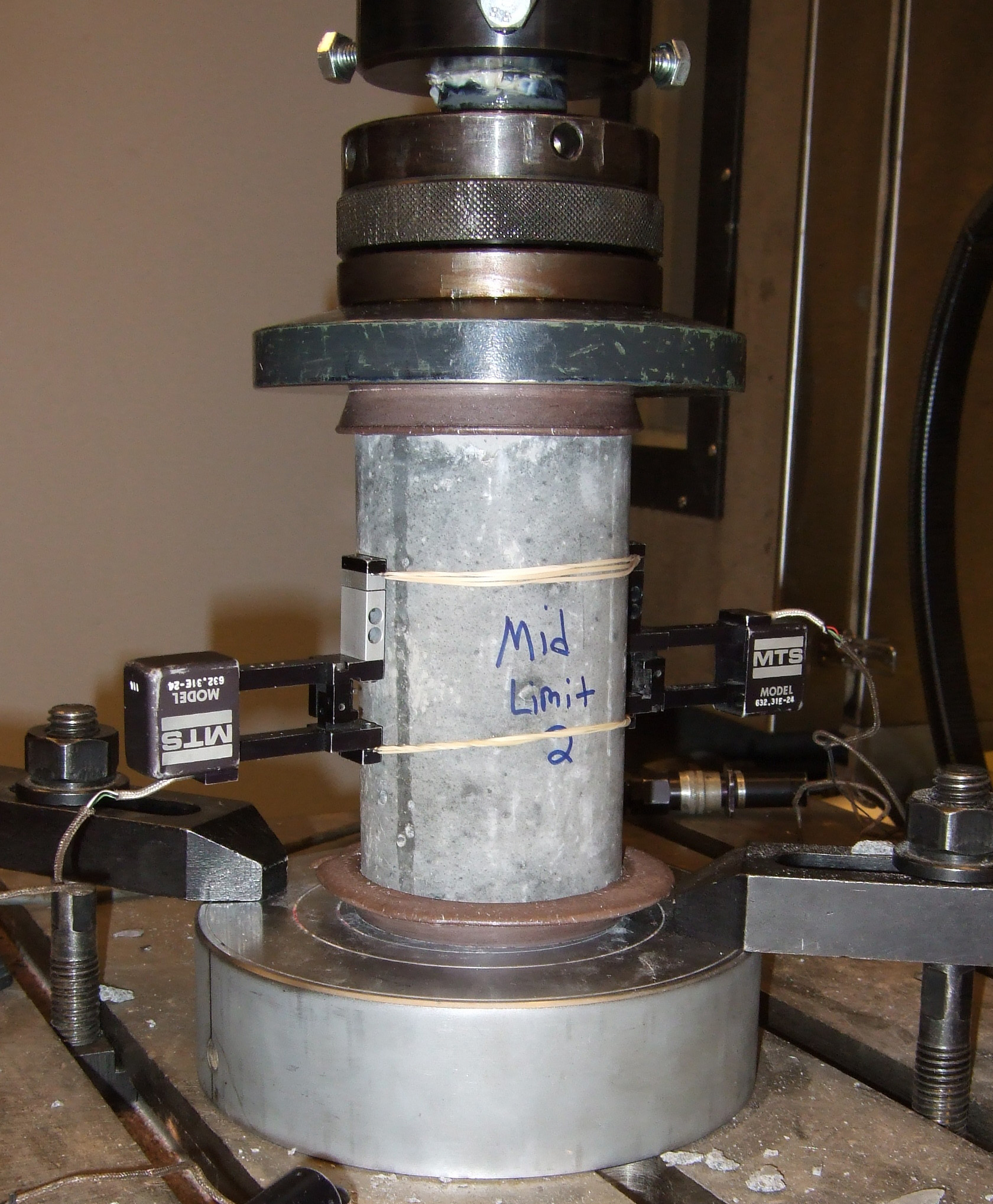
Compression testing of a concrete cylinder

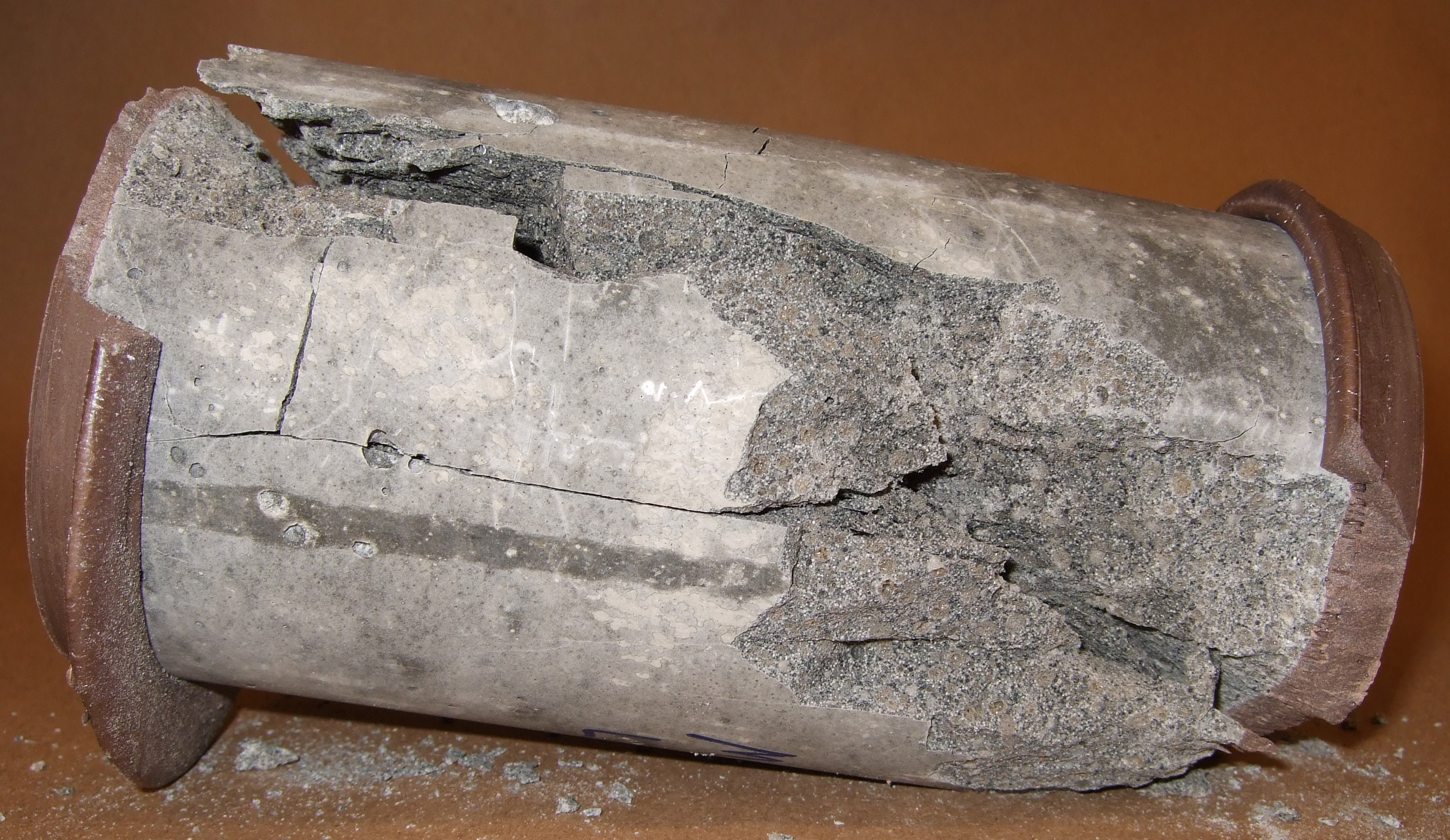
Same cylinder after failure

Engineers usually specify the required compressive strength of concrete, which is normally given as the 28-day compressive strength in megapascals (MPa) or pounds per square inch (psi). Twenty eight days is a long wait to determine if desired strengths are going to be obtained, so three-day and seven-day strengths can be useful to predict the ultimate 28-day compressive strength of the concrete. A 25% strength gain between 7 and 28 days is often observed with 100% OPC (ordinary Portland cement) mixtures, and between 25% and 40% strength gain can be realized with the inclusion of pozzolans such as flyash, and supplementary cementitious materials (SCMs) such as slag cement. Strength gain depends on the type of mixture, its constituents, the use of standard curing, proper testing by certified technicians, and care of cylinders in transport. For practical immediate considerations, it is incumbent to accurately test the fundamental properties of concrete in its fresh, plastic state.

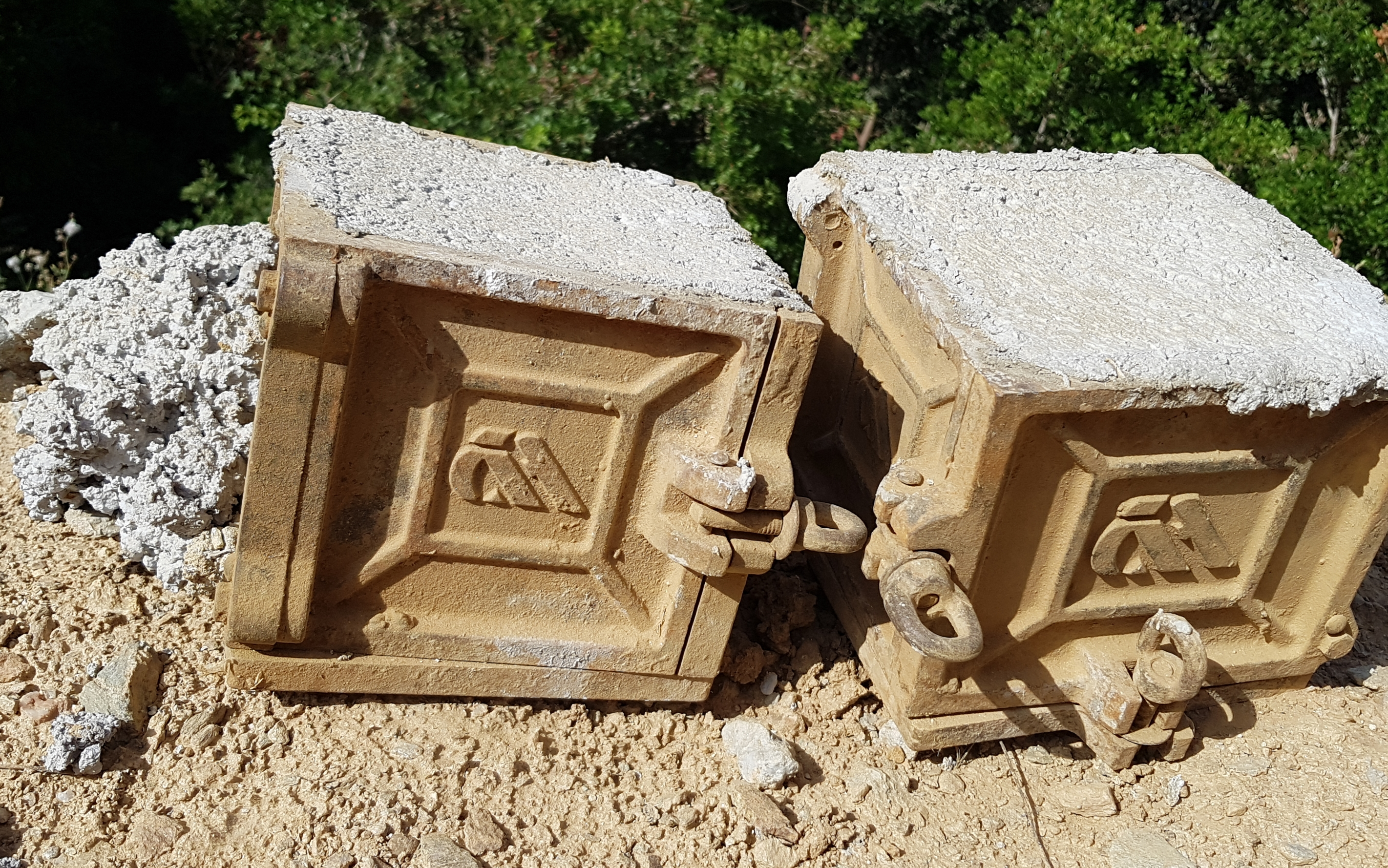
Field cured concrete in cubic steel molds (Greece)

Concrete is typically sampled while being placed, with testing protocols requiring that test samples be cured under laboratory conditions (standard cured). Additional samples may be field cured (non-standard) for the purpose of early 'stripping' strengths, that is, form removal, evaluation of curing, etc. but the standard cured cylinders comprise acceptance criteria. Concrete tests can measure the "plastic" (unhydrated) properties of concrete prior to, and during placement. As these properties affect the hardened compressive strength and durability of concrete (resistance to freeze-thaw), the properties of workability (slump/flow), temperature, density and age are monitored to ensure the production and placement of 'quality' concrete. Depending on project location, tests are performed per ASTM International, European Committee for Standardization or Canadian Standards Association. As measurement of quality must represent the potential of concrete material delivered and placed, it is imperative that concrete technicians performing concrete tests are certified to do so according to these standards. Structural design, concrete material design and properties are often specified in accordance with national/regional design codes such as American Concrete Institute.

Compressive strength tests are conducted by certified technicians using an instrumented, hydraulic ram which has been annually calibrated with instruments traceable to the Cement and Concrete Reference Laboratory (CCRL) of the National Institute of Standards and Technology (NIST) in the U.S., or regional equivalents internationally. Standardized form factors are 6" by 12" or 4" by 8" cylindrical samples, with some laboratories opting to utilize cubic samples. These samples are compressed to failure. Tensile strength tests are conducted either by three-point bending of a prismatic beam specimen or by compression along the sides of a standard cylindrical specimen. These destructive tests are not to be equated with nondestructive testing using a rebound hammer or probe systems which are hand-held indicators, for relative strength of the top few millimeters, of comparative concretes in the field.

== Mechanical properties at elevated temperature ==
Temperatures elevated above 300 °C (572 °F) degrade the mechanical properties of concrete, including compressive strength, fracture strength, tensile strength, and elastic modulus, with respect to deleterious effect on its structural changes.

=== Chemical changes ===
With elevated temperature, concrete will lose its hydration product because of water evaporation. Therefore its resistance of moisture flow of concrete decreases and the number of unhydrated cement grains grows with the loss of chemically bonded water, resulting in lower compressive strength. Also, the decomposition of calcium hydroxide in concrete forms lime and water. When temperature decreases, lime will reacts with water and expands to cause a reduction of strength.

=== Physical changes ===
At elevated temperatures, small cracks form and propagate inside the concrete with increased temperature, possibly caused by differential thermal coefficients of expansion within the cement matrix. Likewise, when water evaporates from concrete, the loss of water impedes the expansion of cement matrix by shrinking. Moreover, when the temperatures reach 57.3 °C (135.1 °F), siliceous aggregates transform from α-phase, hexagonal crystal system, to β-phase, bcc structure, causing expansion of concrete and decreasing the strength of the material.

=== Spalling ===
Spalling at elevated temperature is pronounced, driven by vapor pressure and thermal stresses. When the concrete surface is subjected to a sufficiently high temperature, the water close to the surface starts to move out from the concrete into atmosphere. However, with a high temperature gradient between the surface and the interior, vapor can also move inwards where it may condense with lower temperatures. A water-saturated interior resists the further movement of vapor into the mass of the concrete. If the condensation rate of vapor is much faster than the escaping speed of vapor out of concrete due to sufficiently high heating rate or adequately dense pore structure, a large pore pressure can cause spalling. At the same time, thermal expansion on the surface will generate a perpendicular compressive stress opposing the tensile stress within the concrete. Spalling occurs when the compressive stress exceeds the tensile stress.

== See also ==
- Segregation in concrete - particle segregation in concrete applications
- Creep and shrinkage of concrete
