= Fineness (disambiguation) =

Fineness can refer to:

- Fineness, a measure of the purity of precious metals
- Fineness modulus, a measurement of the coarseness of an aggregate
- Fineness ratio, in aerospace engineering, the length to width ratio of a streamlined body
