= Particle =

Small localized object

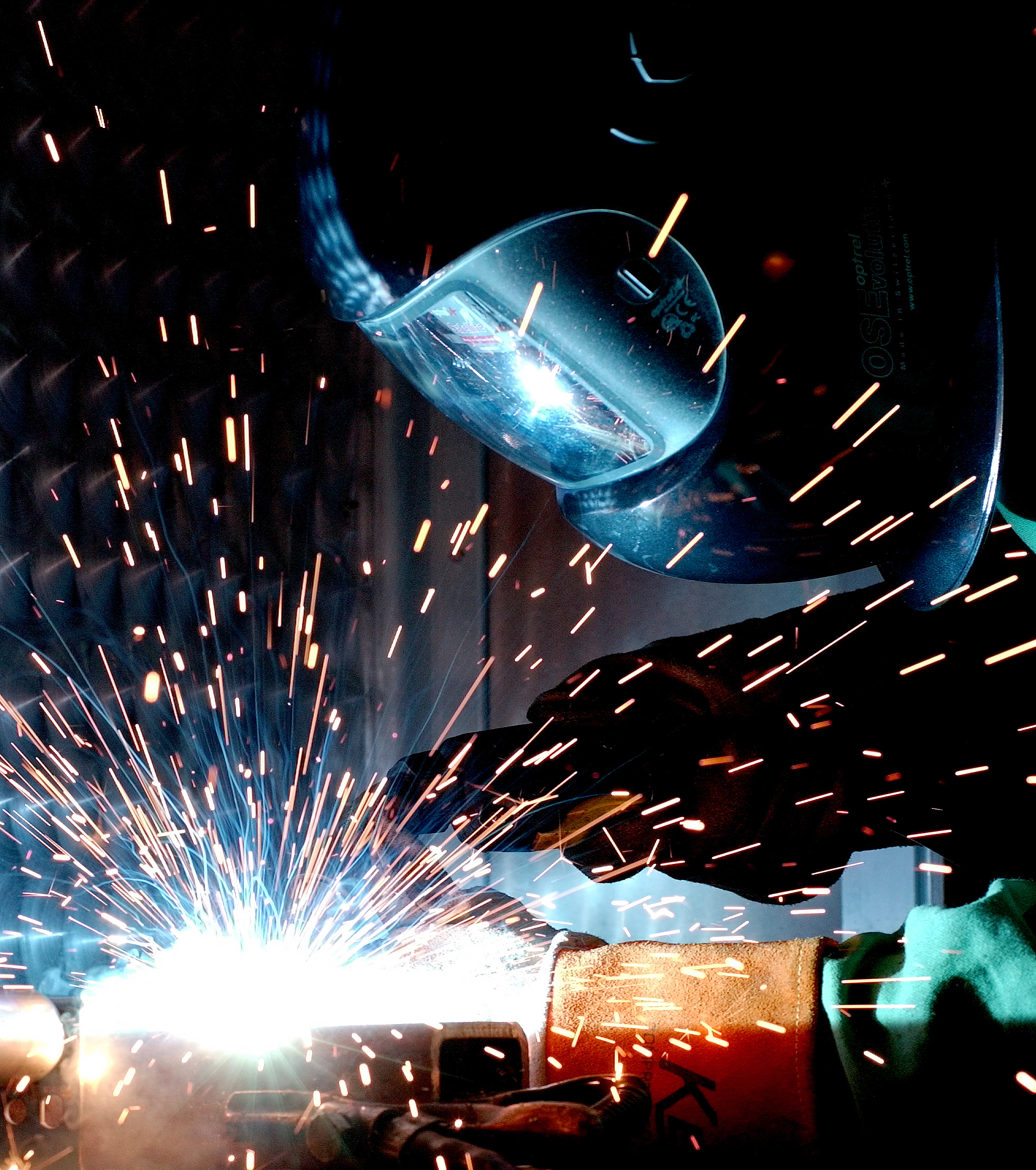
Arc welders need to protect themselves from welding sparks, which are heated metal particles that fly off the welding surface

In the physical sciences, a particle (or corpuscle in older texts) is a separate part of a larger system. Depending on the system they vary greatly in size or quantity, from subatomic particles like the electron, to microscopic particles like atoms and molecules, to macroscopic particles like powders and other granular materials. Particles can also be used to create scientific models of large objects within very large systems, such as humans moving in a crowd, celestial bodies in orbit, or galaxies in the expansion of the universe.

In some fields a particle is a small localized object which can be described by several physical or chemical properties, such as volume, density, or mass. The term particle is rather general in meaning, and is refined as needed by various scientific fields. Anything that is composed of particles may be referred to as being particulate. However, the noun particulate is most frequently used to refer to pollutants in the Earth's atmosphere, which are a suspension of unconnected particles, rather than a connected particle aggregation.

== Physics ==
Particles are often represented as dots. This figure could represent the movement of atoms in a gas, people in crowds, or stars in the night sky.

=== In models ===
In physics, the concept of particles can be used to make simplifying assumptions when modelling nature. For example, to calculate the landing location and speed of a baseball thrown in the air, the baseball can be idealized as a rigid smooth sphere, ignoring its rotation, buoyancy, and friction, reducing the problem to the ballistics in classical mechanics.

=== Size ===
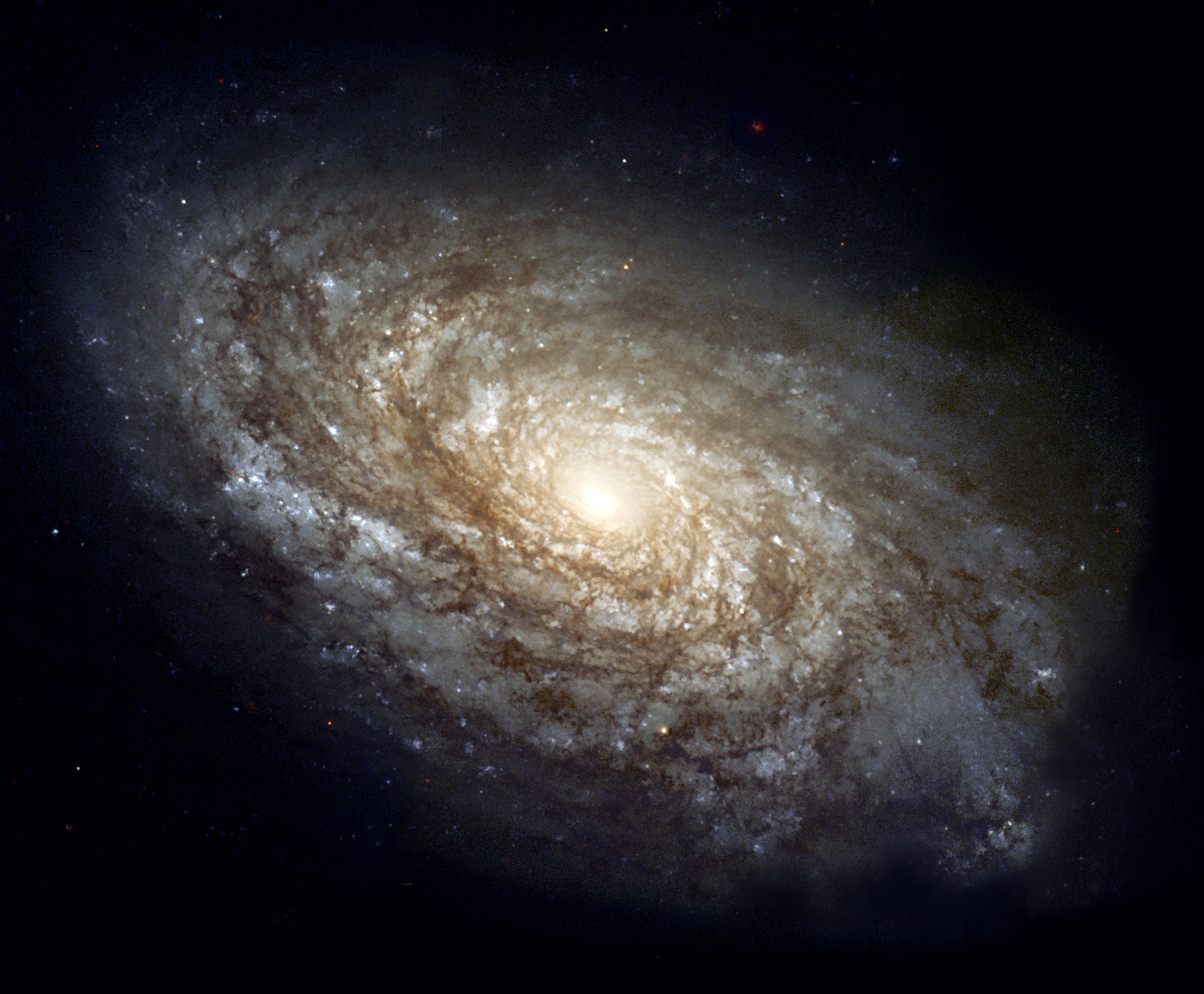
Galaxies are so large that stars can be considered particles relative to them.

The term "particle" is usually applied differently to three classes of sizes. The term macroscopic particle, usually refers to particles much larger than atoms and molecules. These are usually abstracted as point-like particles, even though they have volumes, shapes, structures, etc. Examples of macroscopic particles would include powder, dust, sand, pieces of debris during a car accident, or even objects as big as the stars of a galaxy.

Another type, microscopic particles usually refers to particles of sizes ranging from atoms to molecules, such as carbon dioxide, nanoparticles, and colloidal particles. These particles are studied in chemistry, as well as atomic and molecular physics.

The smallest particles are the subatomic particles, which refer to particles smaller than atoms. These would include particles such as the constituents of atoms – protons, neutrons, and electrons – as well as other types of particles which can only be produced in particle accelerators or cosmic rays. These particles are studied in particle physics.

Because of their extremely small size, the study of microscopic and subatomic particles falls in the realm of quantum mechanics. They will exhibit phenomena demonstrated in the particle in a box model, including wave–particle duality, and whether particles can be considered distinct or identical is an important question in many situations.

=== Particle physics ===
==== Mass ====
In particle physics, a massive particle is an elementary particle with non-zero rest mass while a massless particle has zero rest mass. The photon and gluon are massless. The hypothetical graviton is expected to be massless. All other known elementary particles have mass.

The mass of atoms is overwhelmingly concentrated in their nuclei, made of protons and neutrons, which each have over 1800 times more mass than electrons. Since protons and neutrons are made of quarks and gluons, this mass primarily traced to the interactions of quarks and gluons. The electrons and the electromagnetic binding of electrons to protons adds some additional mass.

Massive particles must move at a speed less than the speed of light. Massless particles, in contrast, must move at the speed of light.

Rest mass, mass observed in a frame at rest with a particle, is not conserved in particle interactions. A massive particle can decay into massless particles and massless particles can combine to produce massive particles. For example, a neutral pion is massive but can decay into two photons in about 10^{−16} seconds.

==== Composition ====
A proton is composed of three quarks and held together with the strong interaction.

Particles may be elementary or composite. Composite particles are composed of other particles. For example, protons are composed of quarks. By contrast, elementary particles (also called fundamental particles) are not made of other particles. According to our current knowledge, only a very small number of these exist, such as leptons, quarks, and gluons, although it is possible that some are composite in currently unknown ways. While composite particles can very often be considered point-like, although having internal structure, elementary particles have so far been found to have no structure.

==== Stability ====
Both elementary (such as muons) and composite particles (such as uranium nuclei), are known to undergo particle decay. Those that do not are called stable particles, such as electrons and helium-4 nuclei. The lifetime of stable particles can be either infinite or large enough to hinder attempts to observe such decays. In the latter case, those particles are called "observationally stable". In general, a particle decays from a high-energy state to a lower-energy state by emitting some form of radiation, such as the emission of photons.

==== Massless particle ====
In particle physics, a massless particle is an elementary particle whose invariant mass is zero. At present the only confirmed massless particle is the photon.

=== Statistical mechanics ===
In physical systems with vast numbers of interacting particles analysis of individual motions is impractical. For example, a single gram of O_{2} contains $2\times 10^{22}$ molecules. For these cases, statistical approaches have been developed which allow prediction of average quantities like the energy from the properties of the particles. The approach provides a theoretical basis for thermodynamics, the ideal gas laws, and understanding brownian motion.

=== Astrophysics ===
Astrophysics uses the idea of "particles" on many levels. Particle radiation is emitted by stars, cosmic rays are high energy particles (primarily bare atomic nuclei), components in planetary rings, components of solar wind, meteors, hydrogen nuclei inside the Sun, dust particles aggregating into planets and interstellar gas collapsing to form a star. Self-gravitating systems of point particles representing stars are used to model galaxy formation.

=== N-body simulation ===
In computational physics, N-body simulations (also called N-particle simulations) are simulations of dynamical systems of particles under the influence of certain conditions, such as being subject to gravity. These simulations are common in cosmology and computational fluid dynamics.

N refers to the number of particles considered. As simulations with higher N are more computationally intensive, systems with large numbers of actual particles will often be approximated to a smaller number of particles, and simulation algorithms need to be optimized through various methods.

== Atmospheric science ==
In atmospheric science a particle is a small localized object which can be described by several physical or chemical properties, such as volume, density, or mass. Dust, soot, and smoke are larger forms of particulate matter with smaller forms being atoms and molecules.

== Soil science ==
Soil is considered composed of particles. The discrete particles in soil are solid; they cannot move relative to each other as easily as particles in a liquid. Force on the soil is transmitted by points of contact between the soil particles, with some of the force deforming the particles. The particles slide past each other in response to the force.

== Distribution of particles ==
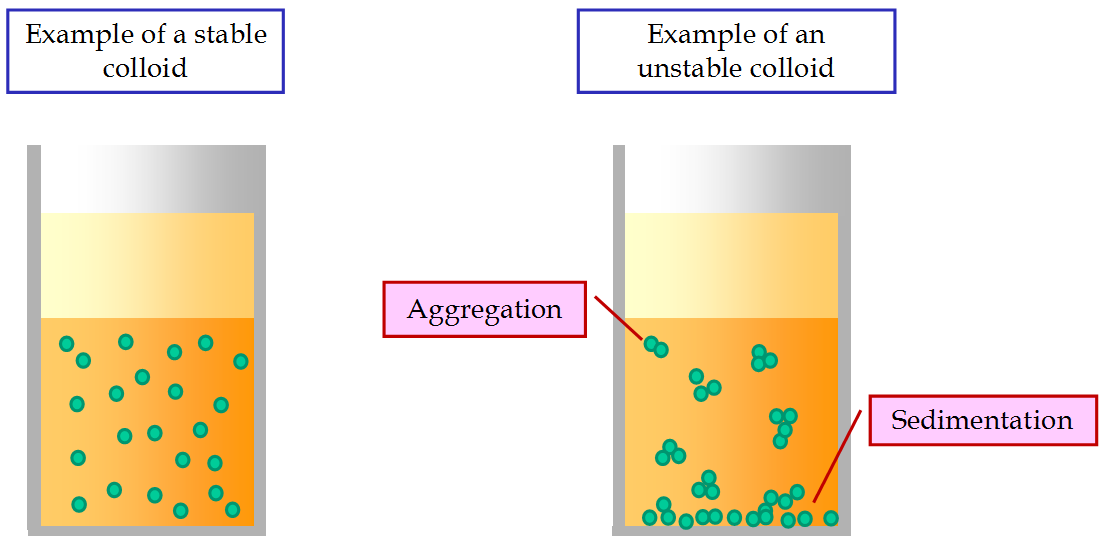
Examples of a stable and of an unstable colloidal dispersion.

Colloidal particles are the components of a colloid. A colloid is a substance microscopically dispersed evenly throughout another substance. Such colloidal system can be solid, liquid, or gaseous; as well as continuous or dispersed. The dispersed-phase particles have a diameter of between approximately 5 and 200 nanometers. Soluble particles smaller than this will form a solution as opposed to a colloid. Colloidal systems (also called colloidal solutions or colloidal suspensions) are the subject of interface and colloid science. Suspended solids may be held in a liquid, while solid or liquid particles suspended in a gas together form an aerosol. Particles may also be suspended in the form of atmospheric particulate matter, which may constitute air pollution. Larger particles can similarly form marine debris or space debris. A conglomeration of discrete solid, macroscopic particles may be described as a granular material.

== See also ==
- Antiparticle
- Brownian motion
- Corpuscularianism
- Fluid parcel
- List of particles
- Matter
- Mechanics
- Particle counter
- Particle detector
- Particle segregation
- Self-propelled particle
- Wave–particle duality
