= Abrams' law =

Concept in civil engineering

Abrams' law (also called Abrams' water-cement ratio law) is a concept in civil engineering that was developed by Duff Abrams. The law states the strength of a concrete mix is inversely related to the mass ratio of water to cement. As the water content increases, the strength of concrete decreases.

Abrams’ law is a special case of a general rule formulated empirically by René Feret:

$$S=\frac{A}{B^{w/c}}$$

where

S is the compressive strength of concrete in Mpa
A and B are constants: A=96 and B=7 (this is valid for the strength of concrete at the age of 28 days)
w/c is the water–cement ratio, which typically varies from 0.40 to 0.60
