= Thickened fluids =

Beverage for those with difficulty swallowing

Thickened fluids and thickened drinks are often used for people with dysphagia, a disorder of swallowing function. The thicker consistency makes it less likely that individuals will aspirate while they are drinking. Individuals with difficulty swallowing may find that liquids cause coughing, spluttering, or even aspiration, and that thickening drinks enables them to swallow safely. Patients may be advised to consume thickened liquids after being extubated.

Liquid thickness may be measured by two methods, with a viscometer or by line spread test.

== Thickening amount ==
There are several levels of consistency/viscosity and these have historically varied by country, although the launch of the International Dysphagia Diet Standardisation Initiative (IDDSI) aims to remove this variation. The thickness of a drink can be tested by measuring the amount that pours out of a standard 10ml IDDSI funnel in 10 seconds.

- 0 – Thin liquids: Unthickened, such as water or juice. Common thin liquids include coffee, tea, clear broth, clear juice, skim milk, 2% milk, and whole milk.
- 1 – Slightly thick (between 9 and 6 ml pour out of a 10ml IDDSI funnel in 10 seconds)
- 2 – Mildly thick (between 6 and 2 ml pour out)
- 3 – Moderately thick (2 or less ml pour out)
- 4 – Extremely thick – drinks of this stage should require a spoon to drink and are comparable to pureed foods.

== Thickening agents ==
There are multiple commercial thickeners on the market for thickening liquids. Vendors also offer pre-thickened liquids such as water, juice, and milk in individual serving sized cartons. Some commercial thickeners use modified maize starch, which helps support hydration and nutritional levels, while others use xanthan gum.

== Medical value ==
There is no good evidence that thickening liquids reduces pneumonia in dysphagia and it may be associated with poorer hydration and with an adverse effect on quality of life. Thicker consistencies may also be associated with pharyngeal residue and perhaps with an increased risk of severe pneumonia if aspirated. Concern has been expressed that patients receiving modified texture diets, such as thickened liquids, are not receiving adequate information about these diets' pros and cons, and are therefore not giving valid informed consent.

== See also ==
- Consistometer
