= Segregation in concrete =

Segregation in concrete is a case of particle segregation in concrete applications, in which particulate solids tend to segregate by virtue of differences in the size, density, shape and other properties of particles of which they are composed. when the workability of concrete is high under pouring conditions, or the amount of mortar is larger than the void volume of coarse aggregate, or the particle size of aggregate is not ideal, excessive vibration can cause segregation bleeding or lighter weight

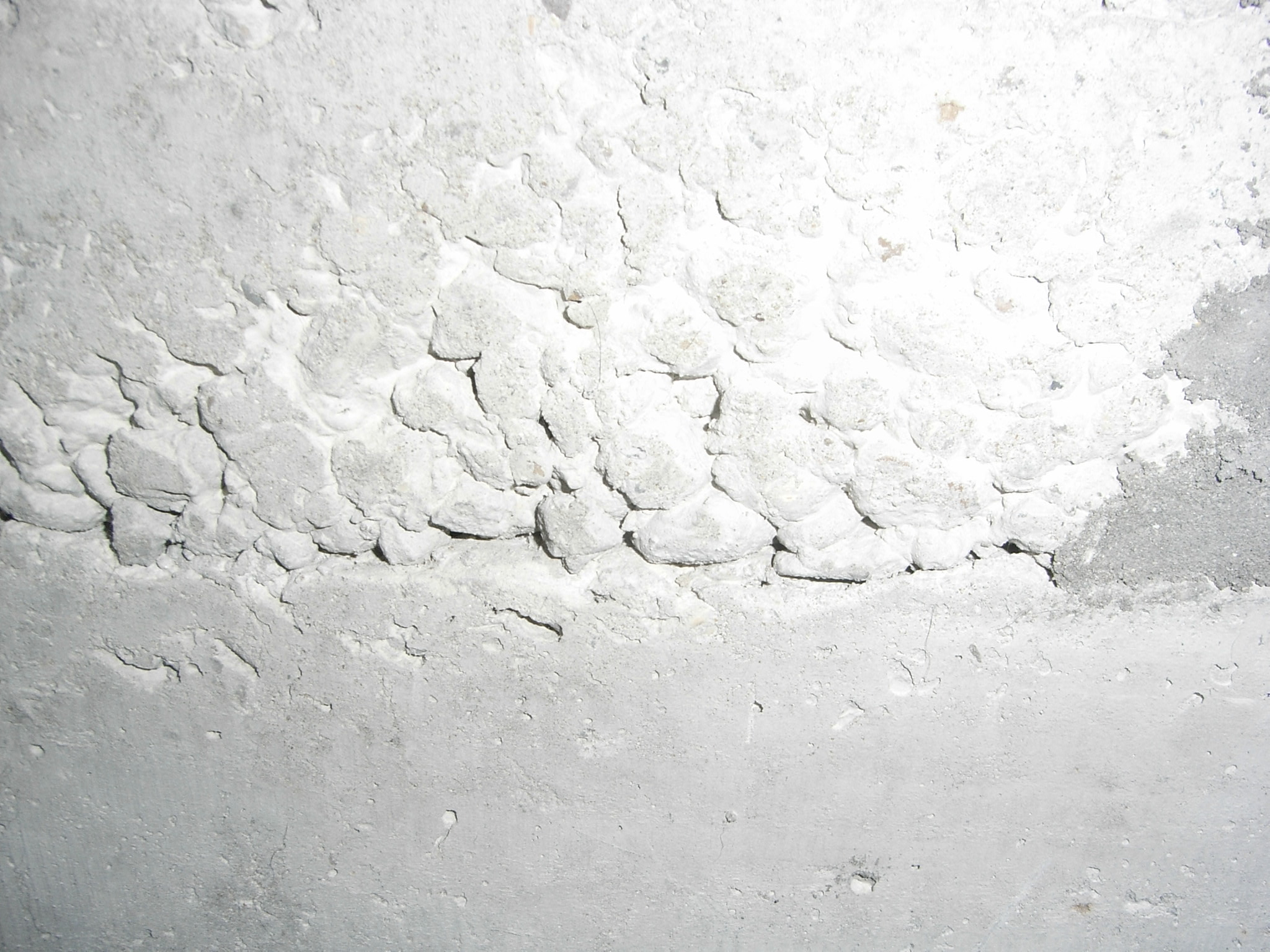
Segregation in concrete

== Definition ==
It is described by American Society for Testing and Materials as follows: "Segregation in concrete is commonly thought of as separation of some size groups of aggregates from cement mortar (Note: Mortar is a mixture of fine aggregates and cement, that in concrete acts as a binder between particles of coarse aggregates.) in isolated locations with corresponding deficiencies of these materials in other locations. Segregation results in proportions of the laid concrete being in variation with those designed. Segregation could result from internal factors such as concrete that is not proportioned properly and not mixed adequately, or too workable a mix. It also could result from external factors such as too much vibration, (Note: Compaction describes the process employed to obtain maximum density in concrete after it has been deposited in place. Compaction could be achieved by mechanical vibrators, devices that vibrate at various frequencies and which transfer these vibrations to concrete.) improper transportation, placement, or adverse weather conditions. The corresponding increase in proportion of cement paste in upper areas would tend to make them susceptible to increased shrinkage and formation of cracks. These cracks could be 10 μm to 500 μm wide, formed perpendicular to the surface, and be in the form of map patterns."

The concrete should be free from segregation. It is defined as the breaking up of cohesion (separation of concrete aggregate) in a mass of concrete. It results in honey-combing, decrease in density, and ultimately loss of strength of hardened concrete. The effect of aggregate segregation on the mechanical and transport behavior of concrete has been the focus of both modeling as well as experimental investigation.

== See also ==
- Properties of concrete
