= Duff Abrams =

American engineer (1880–1965)

Duff A. Abrams (1880–1965) was an American researcher in the field of composition and properties of concrete. He developed the basic methods for testing concrete characteristics that remain in use. A professor with the Lewis Institute, he studied the component materials of concrete in the early 20th century.

Abrams was researcher, professor, and director of the research laboratory of the Portland Cement Association in Chicago. He was elected in 1915 a fellow of the American Association for the Advancement of Science. He was also president of the American Concrete Association (ACI) from 1930 to 1931. He was awarded the Frank P. Brown Medal in 1942. He was a student of Arthur Newell Talbot.

Abrams investigated the influence of the composition of concrete mixes on the strength of the end product. Some of the results of his research were: the definition of the concept of fineness modulus; the definition of the water–cement ratio; a concrete slump test for the workability of a concrete mix by using what the Abrams cone. In a comprehensive research program, Abrams established the relationship between the water–cement ratio and the compressive strength of concrete. Abrams' law states that the compressive strength of concrete is inversely related to its water-cement (w/c) ratio, meaning higher water content reduces strength. The results were first published in 1918 in D. A. Abrams, Design of Concrete Mixtures, Bulletin 1, Structural Materials Research Laboratory, Lewis Institute, Chicago, 1918.

== Bibliography ==
- 1913 – Tests of Bond Between Concrete and Steel
- 1918 – Design of Concrete Mixtures (The effect of the water content and the grain size and grain size distribution on the compressive strength of concrete. Test methods for the water-cement ratio and fineness modulus).
- 1919 – Effect of Curing Condition on Wear and Strength of Concrete (Describing 120 tests on cylinder-shaped samples and 300 tests on cubic samples in various moisture conditions and testing periods varying from 3 days to 4 months).
- 1919 – Effect of Fineness of Cement on Plasticity and Strength of Concrete (Experimental research on the effect of the fineness of concrete and various types of additives on plasticity and strength).
- 1920 – Effect of Hydrated Lime and Other Powdered Admixtures in Concrete
- 1920 – Effect of Storage of Cement (Investigation of storage conditions for periods up to 5 years).
- 1920 – Effect of Tannic Acid on Strength of Concrete
- 1921 – Quantities of Materials for Concrete, D. A. Abrams en Stanton Walker (Recipes for concrete reporting its strength after 28 days of curing ranging from 2000 to 4000 psi).
- 1922 – Flexural Strength of Plain Concrete (Relationship between flexural strength and compressive strength)
