= Flow table test =

Concrete consistency test

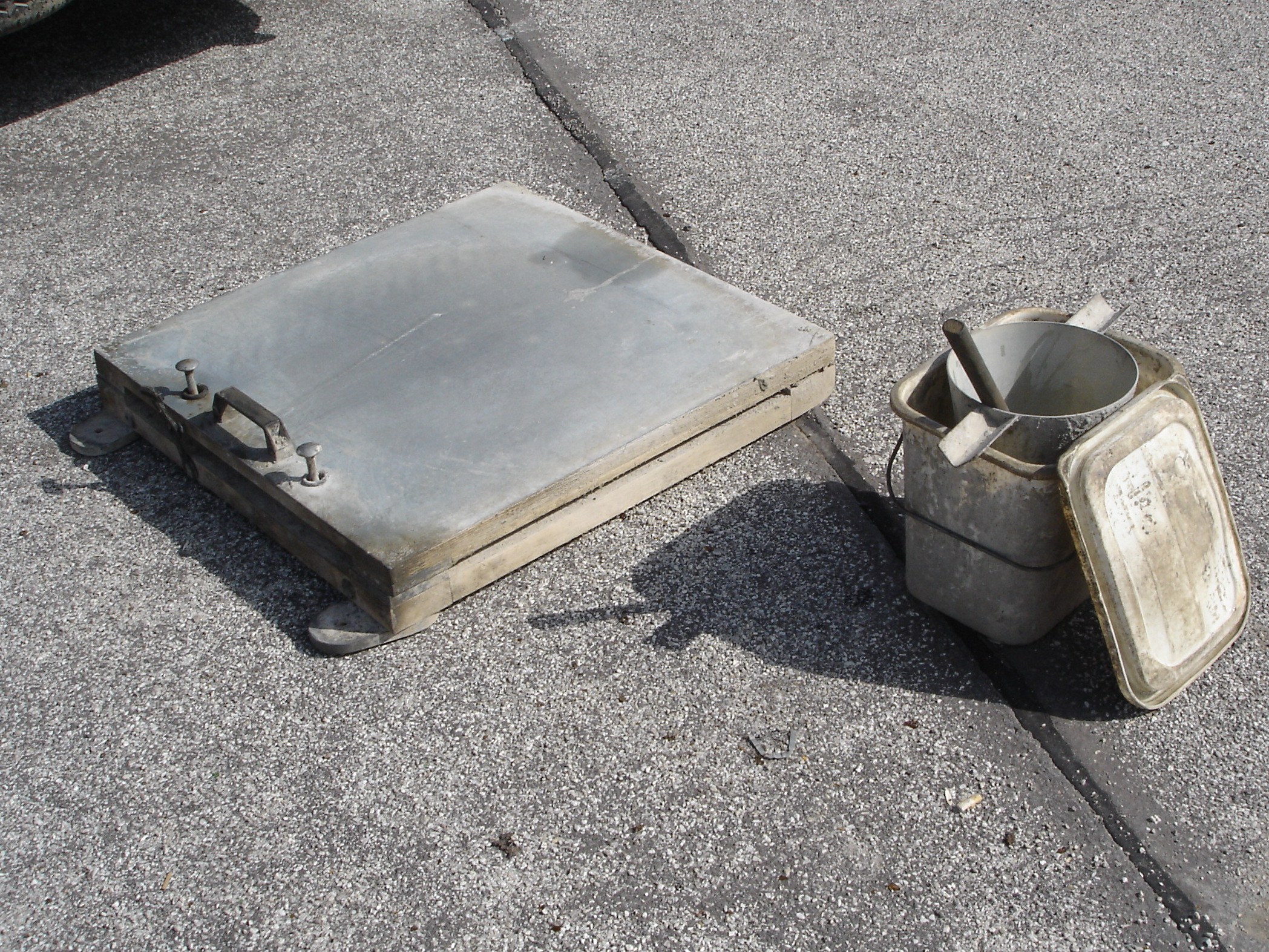
Equipment; flow table, Abrams cone, water bucket and broom.

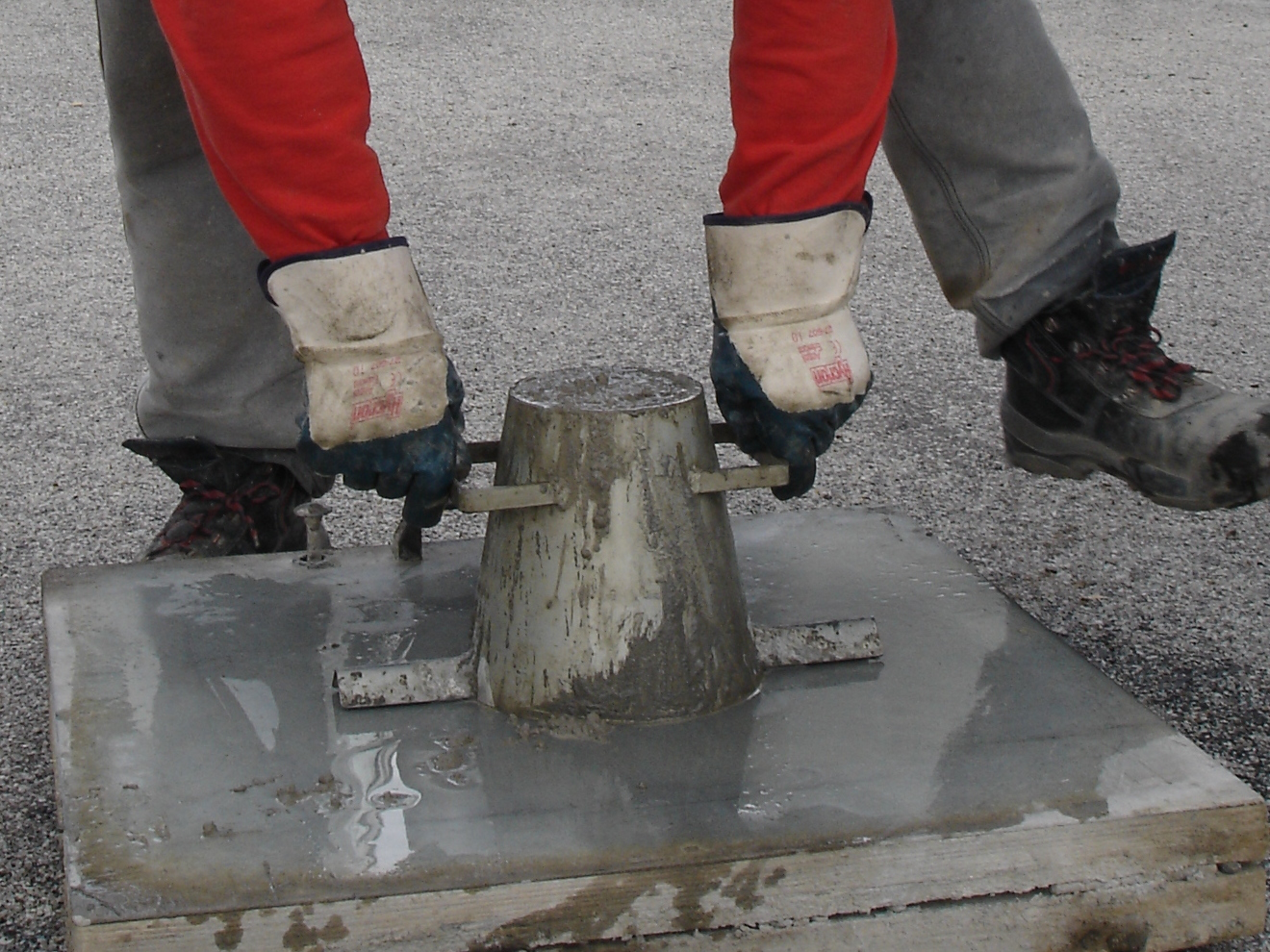
The cone filled with concrete, prior to lifting.

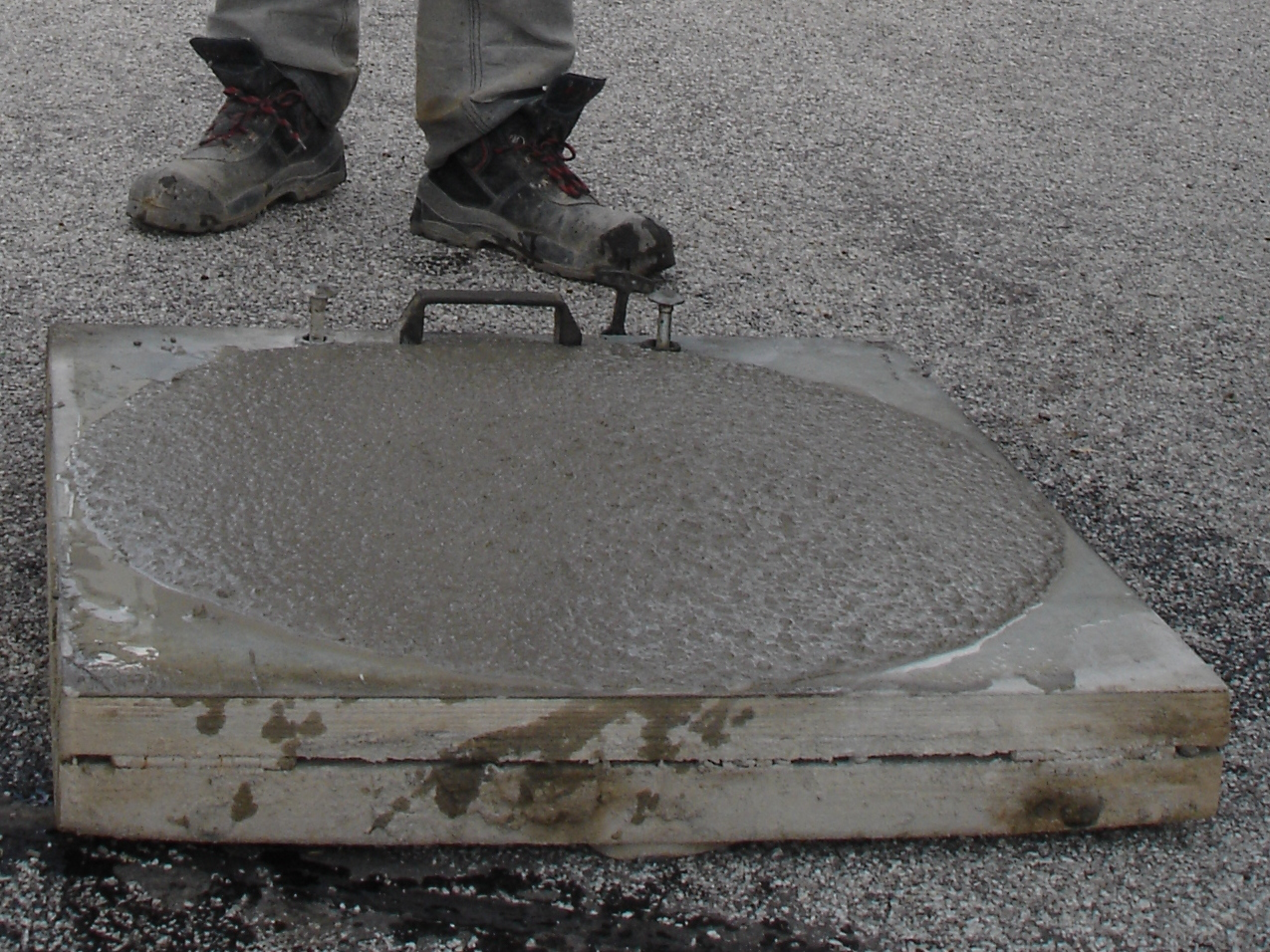
The diameter of the resulting flow is measured.

The flow table test or slump-flow test is a method to determine consistency of fresh concrete. Flow table test is also used to identify transportable moisture limit of solid bulk cargoes. It is used primarily for assessing concrete that is too fluid (workable) to be measured using the slump test, because the concrete will not retain its shape when the cone is removed.

== Application ==
When fresh concrete is delivered to a site by a truck mixer, its consistency needs to be checked before it is poured into formwork.

If consistency is not at the desired level, concrete will not have the required strength and other qualities once it has set. If concrete is too pasty, cavities may form within it. Rebar may become corroded, and concrete will crack. Cavities also reduce the concrete strength.

== Equipment ==
- Flow table with a grip and a hinge, 70 centimetres (28 in) square. In the American version of this test, the table is 10 inches (25 cm) diameter per ASTM C 230.
- Abrams cone, open at the top and at the bottom - 30 centimetres (12 in) high, 17 centimetres (6.7 in) top diameter, 25 centimetres (9.8 in) base diameter.
- Water bucket and broom to wet the flow table.
- Tamping rod, 60 centimetres (24 in) long.

== Conducting the test ==
- The flow table is wetted.
- The cone is placed in the center of the flow table and filled with fresh concrete in two equal layers. Each layer is tamped 10 times with a tamping rod.
- Wait 30 seconds before lifting the cone.
- The cone is lifted, allowing the concrete to flow.
- The flow table is then lifted up 40mm and then dropped 15 times, causing the concrete to flow.
- After this the diameter of flow of the concrete is measured

== See also ==
- Concrete slump test
- Duff Abrams
- Self-consolidating concrete

== External links and sources ==
- DIN EN 12350-5
- ASTM C 1437 - 15 Standard Test Method for Flow of Hydraulic Cement Mortar
- b-i-m (German)
- Heidelberg Cement (German)
- Concrete Flow Table in an online shop
