= Self-leveling concrete =

High flow polymer-modified cement

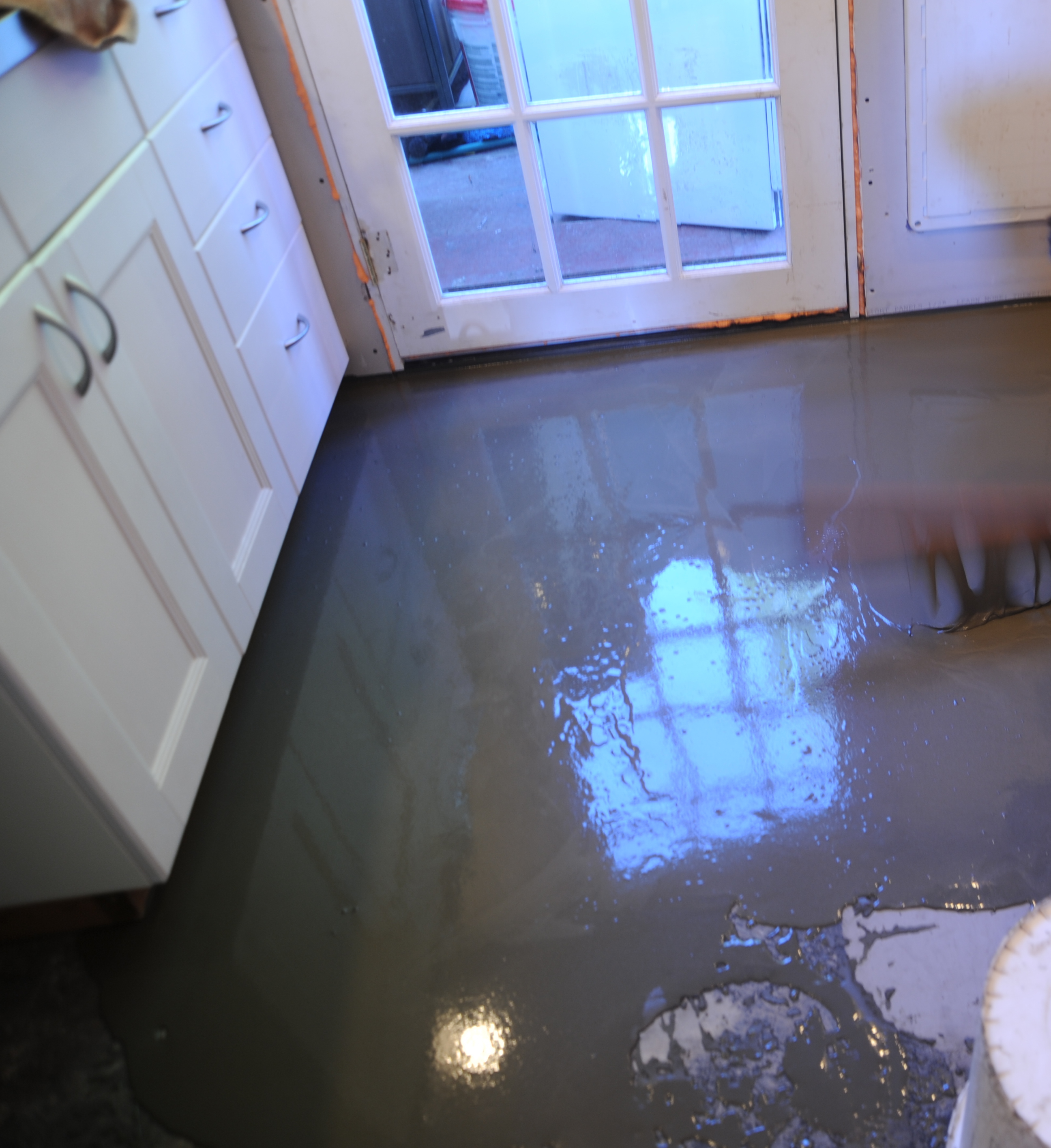
Self-leveling concrete being applied to a kitchen floor

Self-leveling concrete has polymer-modified cement that has high flow characteristics and, in contrast to traditional concrete, does not require the addition of excessive amounts of water for placement. Self-leveling concrete is typically used to create a flat and smooth surface with a compressive strength similar to or higher than that of traditional concrete prior to installing interior floor coverings. Self-leveling concrete has increased in popularity as the degree of flatness and smoothness required for floor covering products has increased, with vinyl flooring becoming thinner and floor tiles larger, for example.

Self-consolidating (or self-compacting) concrete (SCC) is a separate type of highly mobile (fluid) concrete formulation, which is based on superplasticizers, and is therefore also somewhat self-leveling.

== History ==
Self-leveling concrete was invented in 1952 by Axel Karlsson from Sweden. The first product was a combination of wood glue, fine sand and cement with additives. It was called flytspackel, which directly translates to "floating putty".

The term self-leveling can be traced back to a patent applied by the company Lafarge in 1997. The term is used to differentiate it from traditional concrete, which is typically stiffer and requires more labor to get into place and finish with a trowel.

== Application ==
In the category of self-leveling concrete there are two main groups of materials: underlayments and toppings. An underlayment is installed over an existing subfloor to smooth it out and correct any surface irregularities prior to the installation of all types of floor coverings, including sheet vinyl, vinyl composition tile (VCT), wood, ceramic tile and carpet. A topping performs a similar function but acts as the actual finished floor without the need for a floor covering. Some typical applications for concrete toppings include warehouse floors, light industrial applications, retail stores and institutional facilities. Concrete toppings can also receive color, stains, saw cuts or mechanical polishing to produce a decorative concrete finished wear surface.

When self-leveling concrete is poured, it has a viscosity similar to that of pancake batter. A gauge rake is used to move it into place without spreading it too thin. The finishing is then done by lightly breaking the surface tension of the product using a tool called a smoother. The polymers in the self-leveling mix keep the viscosity of the product such that it remains uniform in composition from top to bottom without the sand aggregates sinking to the bottom of the installed layer. The typical installation thickness of these products is about 1/4 inch (6 mm) to ensure there is enough mass present for the material to flow, although some self-leveling products now exist that can be installed at an average thickness of only 1/8 inch (3 mm).

== See also ==
- Self-consolidating concrete (also known as self-compacting concrete and abbreviated to SCC)
