= Schmidt hammer =

Type of measuring instrument

A Schmidt hammer, also known as a Swiss hammer or a rebound hammer or concrete hammer test, is a device to measure the elastic properties or strength of concrete or rock, mainly surface hardness and penetration resistance. It was invented by Ernst Heinrich Wilhelm Schmidt, a Swiss engineer.

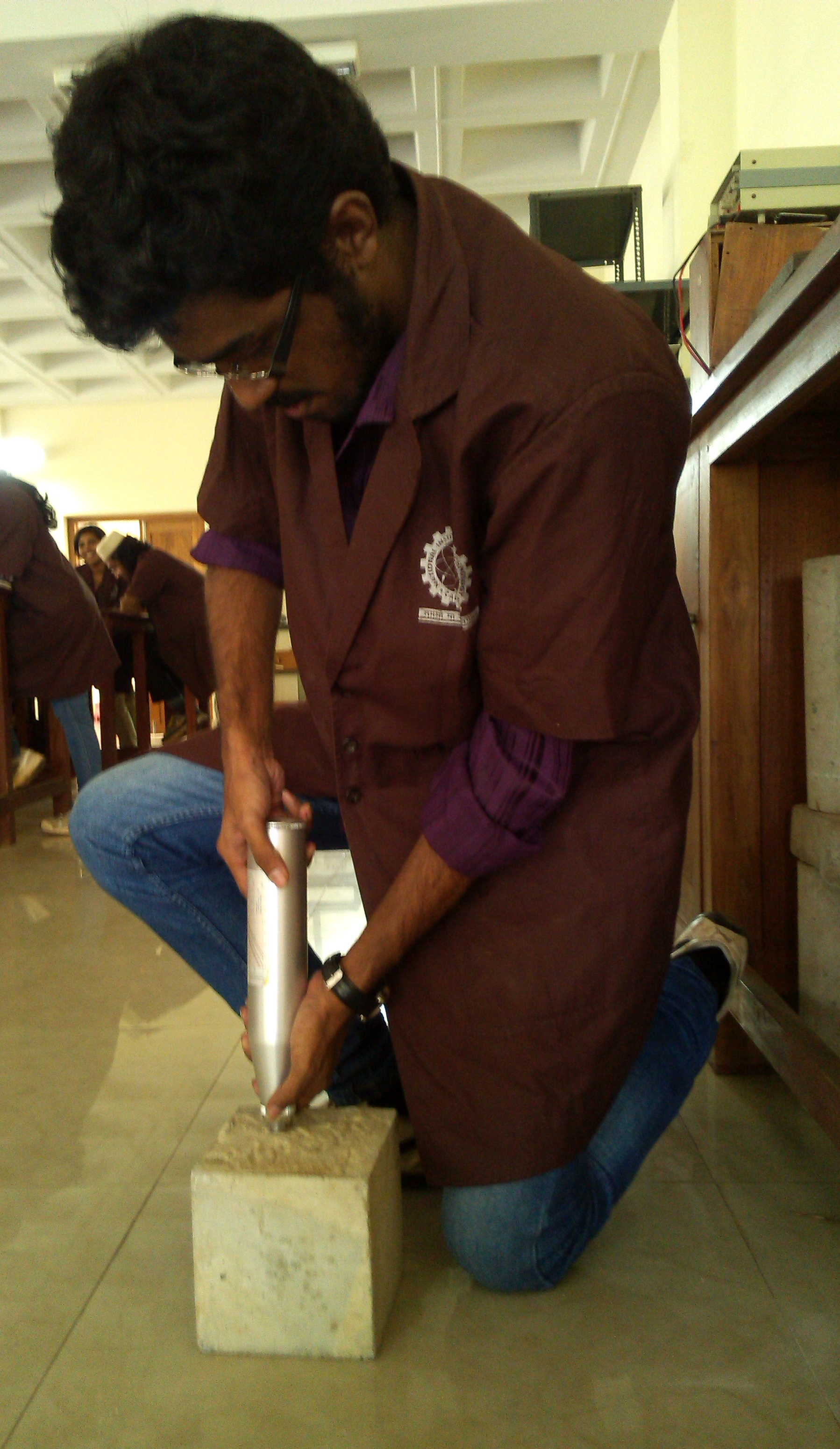
Testing the compressive strength of a concrete cube using Schmidt hammer

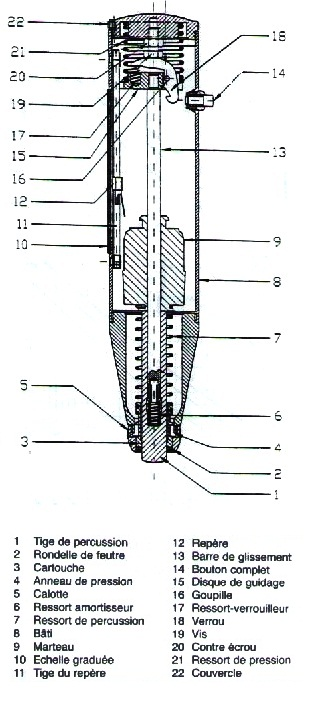
Cross section

The hammer measures the rebound of a spring-loaded mass impacting against the surface of a sample. The test hammer hits the concrete at a defined energy. Its rebound is dependent on the hardness of the concrete and is measured by the test equipment. By reference to a conversion chart, the rebound value can be used to determine the concrete's compressive strength. When conducting the test, the hammer should be held at right angles to the surface, which in turn should be flat and smooth. The hammer comes with a small grinding stone to create a flat and smooth surface, before the test. The rebound reading will be affected by the orientation of the hammer: when used oriented upward (for example, on the underside of a suspended slab), gravity will increase the rebound distance of the mass, and vice versa for a test conducted on a floor slab. Schmidt hammer measurements are on an arbitrary scale ranging from 10 to 100 and a table gives the corresponding compression strength in kN/mm², MPa or psi.

Schmidt hammers are available from manufacturers in several different energy ranges, including (i) Type L-0.735 Nm impact energy, (ii) Type N-2.207 Nm impact energy, and (iii) Type M-29.43 Nm impact energy.

The test is also sensitive to other factors:

- Local variation in the sample. To minimize this, it is recommended to take a selection of readings and take an average or median value.
- Water content of the sample; a saturated material will give different results from a dry one.

Prior to testing, the Schmidt hammer should be calibrated using a calibration test anvil supplied by the manufacturer. Twelve readings should be taken, dropping the highest and lowest, and then taking the average of the ten remaining. This method of testing is classed as indirect as it does not give a direct measurement of the strength of the material. It simply gives an indication based on surface properties, and as such is suitable only for making comparisons between samples.

This method for testing concrete is governed by ASTM C805. A European standard for testing concrete in structures is EN 12504-2. ASTM D5873 describes the procedure for testing of rock.
