= Creep and shrinkage of concrete =

Long-term deformation of concrete due to drying shrinkage and mechanical stress

Creep and shrinkage of concrete are two physical properties of concrete. The creep of concrete, which originates from the calcium silicate hydrates (C-S-H) in the hardened Portland cement paste (which is the binder of mineral aggregates), is fundamentally different from the creep of metals and polymers. Unlike the creep of metals, it occurs at all stress levels and, within the service stress range, is linearly dependent on the stress if the pore water content is constant. Unlike the creep of polymers and metals, it exhibits multi-months aging, caused by chemical hardening due to hydration which stiffens the microstructure, and multi-year aging, caused by long-term relaxation of self-equilibrated micro-stresses in the nano-porous microstructure of the C-S-H. If concrete is fully dried, it does not creep, but it is next to impossible to dry concrete fully without severe cracking.

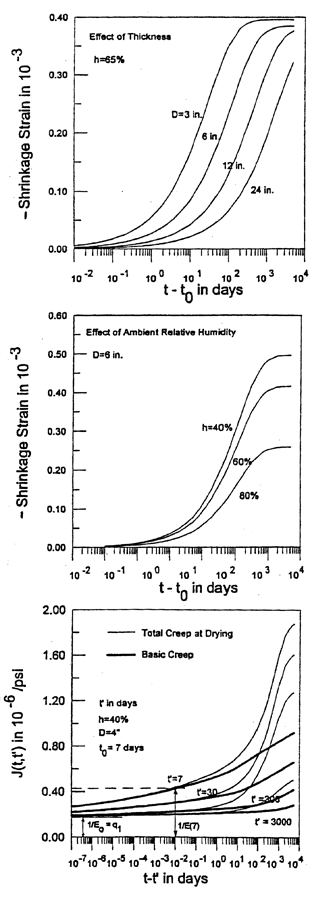
Fig. 1

Changes of pore water content due to drying or wetting processes cause significant volume changes of concrete in load-free specimens. They are called the shrinkage (typically causing strains between 0.0002 and 0.0005, and in low strength concretes even 0.0012) or swelling (< 0.00005 in normal concretes, < 0.00020 in high strength concretes). To separate shrinkage from creep, the compliance function $J(t, t')$, defined as the stress-produced strain $\epsilon$ (i.e., the total strain minus shrinkage) caused at time t by a unit sustained uniaxial stress $\sigma = 1$ applied at age $t'$, is measured as the strain difference between the loaded and load-free specimens.

The multi-year creep evolves logarithmically in time (with no final asymptotic value), and over the typical structural lifetimes it may attain values 3 to 6 times larger than the initial elastic strain. When a deformation is suddenly imposed and held constant, creep causes relaxation of critically produced elastic stress. After unloading, creep recovery takes place, but it is partial, because of aging.

In practice, creep during drying is inseparable from shrinkage. The rate of creep increases with the rate of change of pore humidity (i.e., relative vapor pressure in the pores). For small specimen thickness, the creep during drying greatly exceeds the sum of the drying shrinkage at no load and the creep of a loaded sealed specimen (Fig. 1 bottom). The difference, called the drying creep or Pickett effect (or stress-induced shrinkage), represents a hygro-mechanical coupling between strain and pore humidity changes.

Drying shrinkage at high humidities (Fig. 1 top and middle) is caused mainly by compressive stresses in the solid microstructure which balance the increase in capillary tension and surface tension on the pore walls. At low pore humidities (<75%), shrinkage is caused by a decrease of the disjoining pressure across nano-pores less than about 3 nm thick, filled by adsorbed water.

The chemical processes of Portland cement hydration lead to another type of shrinkage, called the autogeneous shrinkage, which is observed in sealed specimens, i.e., at no moisture loss. It is caused partly by chemical volume changes, but mainly by self-desiccation due to loss of water consumed by the hydration reaction. It amounts to only about 5% of the drying shrinkage in normal concretes, which self-desiccate to about 97% pore humidity. But it can equal the drying shrinkage in modern high-strength concretes with very low water-cement ratios, which may self-desiccate to as low as 75% humidity.

The creep originates in the calcium silicate hydrates (C-S-H) of hardened Portland cement paste. It is caused by slips due to bond ruptures, with bond restorations at adjacent sites. The C-S-H is strongly hydrophilic, and has a colloidal microstructure disordered from a few nanometers up. The paste has a porosity of about 0.4 to 0.55 and an enormous specific surface area, roughly 500 m^{2}/cm^{3}. Its main component is the tri-calcium silicate hydrate gel (3 CaO · 2 SiO_{3} · 3 H_{2}O, in short C_{3}S_{2}H_{3}). The gel forms particles of colloidal dimensions, weakly bound by van der Waals forces.

The physical mechanism and modeling are still being debated. The constitutive material model in the equations that follow is not the only one available but has at present the strongest theoretical foundation and fits best the full range of available test data.

== Stress–strain relation at constant environment ==
In service, the stresses in structures are < 50% of concrete strength, in which case the stress–strain relation is linear, except for corrections due to microcracking when the pore humidity changes. The creep may thus be characterized by the compliance function $J(t, t')$ (Fig. 2). As $t'$ increases, the creep value for fixed $t - t'$ diminishes. This phenomenon, called aging, causes that $J$ depends not only on the time lag $t - t'$ but on both $t$ and $t'$ separately. At variable stress $\sigma(t)$, each stress increment $\mbox{d}\sigma(t')$ applied at time $t'$ produces strain history $\mbox{d} \epsilon(t) = J(t, t') \mbox{d} \sigma(t')$. The linearity implies the principle of superposition (introduced by Boltzmann and for the case of aging, by Volterra). This leads to the (uniaxial) stress–strain relation of linear aging viscoelasticity:

$\epsilon(t) = \int_{t_1}^t J(t,t^\prime) \mbox{d} \sigma(t^\prime) + \epsilon^0 (t)$	1

Here $\epsilon^0$ denotes shrinkage strain $\epsilon_{sh}$ augmented by thermal expansion, if any. The integral is the Stieltjes integral, which admits histories $\sigma (t)$ with jumps; for time intervals with no jumps, one may set $\mbox{d} \sigma (t') = [\mbox{d} \sigma (t') / \mbox{d} t'] \mbox{d} t'$ to obtain the standard (Riemann) integral. When history $\epsilon(t)$ is prescribed, then Eq.(1) represents a Volterra integral equation for $\sigma (t)$. This equation is not analytically integrable for realistic forms of $J(t, t')$, although numerical integration is easy. The solution $\sigma (t)$ for strain $\epsilon = 1$ imposed at any age $\hat{t}$ (and for $\epsilon^0 = 0$) is called the relaxation function $R(t, \hat{t} )$.

To generalize Eq. (1) to a triaxial stress–strain relation, one may assume the material to be isotropic, with an approximately constant creep Poisson ratio, $\nu \approx 0.18$. This yields volumetric and deviatoric stress–strain relations similar to Eq. (1) in which $J(t, t')$ is replaced by the bulk and shear compliance functions:

$J_K(t,t^\prime) = 3(1-2\nu) J(t,t^\prime),~~~J_G(t,t^\prime) = 2(1+\nu) J(t,t^\prime)$	2

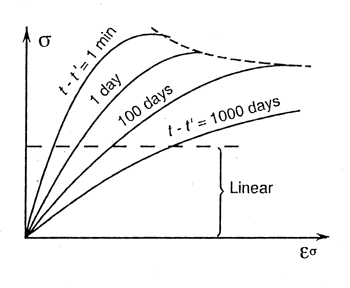
Fig. 2

At high stress, the creep law appears to be nonlinear (Fig. 2) but Eq. (1) remains applicable if the inelastic strain due to cracking with its time-dependent growth is included in $\epsilon^0 (t)$. A viscoplastic strain needs to be added to $\epsilon^0 (t)$ only in the case that all the principal stresses are compressive and the smallest in magnitude is much larger in magnitude than the uniaxial compressive strength $f_c'$.

In measurements, Young's elastic modulus $E$ depends not only on concrete age $t'$ but also on the test duration because the curve of compliance $J(t, t')$ versus load duration $t - t'$ has a significant slope for all durations beginning with 0.001 s or less. Consequently, the conventional Young's elastic modulus should be obtained as $E(t') = 1/J(t'+\delta, t')$, where $\delta$ is the test duration. The values $\delta \approx 0.01$ day and $t' = 28$ days give good agreement with the standardized test of $E$, including the growth of $E$ as a function of $t'$, and with the widely used empirical estimate $E = 57,000 \mbox{psi}$ $\sqrt{f'_c /\mbox{psi}}$ $(1 \mbox{psi} = 6895 \mbox{Pa}, f_c' = \mbox{uniaxial compressive strength of concrete})$. The zero-time extrapolation $q_1 = J(t',t') = \lim_{\delta \to 0} J(t'+\delta,t')$ happens to be approximately age-independent, which makes $q_1$ a convenient parameter for defining $J(t, t')$.

For creep at constant total water content, called the basic creep, a realistic rate form of the uniaxial compliance function (the thick curves in Fig. 1 bottom) was derived from the solidification theory:

$\dot J(t,t') = v^{-1}(t)\ \dot C_g(\theta) + 1/\eta_f,~~~v^{-1}(t) = q_2 \left( \lambda_0/t \right)^m + q_3$	3

$\dot C_g(\theta) = \frac{n \theta^{n-1}}{\lambda_0^n +\theta^n},~~~\theta=t-t',~~~1/\eta_f = q_4 /t$	4

where $\dot x = \partial x /\partial t$; $\eta_f$ = flow viscosity, which dominates multi-decade creep; $\theta$ = load duration; $\lambda_0$ = 1 day, $m = 0.5$, $n= 0.1$; $v(t)\rm MPa^{-1}$ = volume of gel per unit volume of concrete, growing due to hydration; and $q_2, q_3, q_4$ = empirical constants (of dimension $\rm MPa^{-1}$). Function $C_g(\theta)$ gives age-independent delayed elasticity of the cement gel (hardened cement paste without its capillary pores) and, by integration, $C_g(\theta) = \mbox{ln}[1+(\theta/\lambda_0)^n]$. Integration of $\dot J(t, t')$ gives $J(t, t')$ as a non-integrable binomial integral, and so, if the values of $J(t, t')$ are sought, they must be obtained by numerical integration or by an approximation formula (a good formula exists). However, for computer structural analysis in time steps, $J(t, t')$ is not needed; only the rate $\dot J(t, t')$ is needed as the input.

Equations (3) and (4) are the simplest formulae satisfying three requirements: 1) Asymptotically for both short and long times $\theta$, $\dot J(t, t')$, should be a power function of time; and 2) so should the aging rate, given by ${\rm \mbox{d} v^{-1}(t)/\mbox{d} t}$) (power functions are indicated by self-similarity conditions); and 3) $\partial^2 J(t,t') /\partial t \partial t' > 0$ (this condition is required to prevent the principle of superposition from giving non-monotonic recovery curves after unloading which are physically objectionable).

== Creep at variable environment ==
At variable mass $w$ of evaporable (i.e., not chemically bound) water per unit volume of concrete, a physically realistic constitutive relation may be based on the idea of microprestress $S$, considered to be a dimensionless measure of the stress peaks at the creep sites in the microstructure. The microprestress is produced as a reaction to chemical volume changes and to changes in the disjoining pressures acting across the hindered adsorbed water layers in nanopores (which are < 1 nm thick on the average and at most up to about ten water molecules, or 2.7 nm, in thickness), confined between the C-S-H sheets. The disjoining pressures develop first due to unequal volume changes of hydration products. Later, they relax due to creep in the C-S-H so as to maintain thermodynamic equilibrium (i.e., equality of chemical potentials of water) with water vapor in the capillary pores, and build up due to any changes of temperature or humidity in these pores. The rate of bond breakages may be assumed to be a quadratic function of the level of microprestress, which requires Eq. (4) to be generalized as

$1/\eta_f = q_4 S$	5

A crucial property is that the microprestress is not appreciably affected by the applied load (since pore water is much more compressible than the solid skeleton and behaves like a soft spring coupled in parallel with a stiff framework). The microprestress relaxes in time and its evolution at each point of a concrete structure may be solved from the differential equation

$\dot S + c_0 S^2 = c_1 \left| \dot T \ln h + T \dot h / h \right|$	6

where $c_0, c_1$ = positive constants (the absolute value ensures that $S$ could never become negative). The microprestress can model the fact that drying and cooling, as well as wetting and heating, accelerate creep. The fact that changes of $w$ or $h$ produce new microprestress peaks and thus activate new creep sites explains the drying creep effect. A part of this effect, however, is caused by the fact that microcracking in a companion load-free specimen renders its overall shrinkage smaller than the shrinkage in an uncracked (compressed) specimen, thus increasing the difference between the two (which is what defines creep).

The concept of microprestress is also needed to explain the stiffening due to aging. One physical cause of aging is that the hydration products gradually fill the pores of hardened cement paste, as reflected in function $v(t)$ in Eq. (3). But hydration ceases after about one year, yet the effect of the age at loading $t'$ is strong even after many years. The explanation is that the microstress peaks relax with age, which reduces the number of creep sites and thus the rate of bond breakages.

At variable environment, time $t$ in Eq. (3) must be replaced by equivalent hydration time $t_e = \int \beta_h \beta_T \mbox{d} t$ where $\beta_h$ = decreasing function of $h$ (0 if $h<$ about 0.8) and $\beta_h \propto \mbox{e}^{-Q_h T/R}$ $(Q_h/R \approx \mbox{2700 K})$. In Eq. (4), $\theta = t-t'$ must be replaced by $t_r-t'_r$ where $t_r = \int \psi_h \psi_T \mbox{d} t$ = reduced time (or maturity), capturing the effect of $h$ and $T$ on creep viscosity; $\psi_h$ = function of $h$ decreasing from 1 at $h=1$ to 0 at $h=0$; $\psi_T \propto \mbox{e}^{-Q_v T/R}$, $Q_v/R \approx$ 5000 K.

The evolution of humidity profiles $h(\mathbf{x},t)$ ($\mathbf{x}$ = coordinate vector) may be approximately considered as uncoupled from the stress and deformation problem and may be solved numerically from the diffusion equation $\rm \dot h =$ div[$C(h)$grad $h] + \dot h_s(t_e)$} where $h_s(t_e)$ = self-desiccation caused by hydration (which reaches about 0.97 in normal concretes and about 0.80 in high strength concretes), $C(h)$ = diffusivity, which decreases about 20 times as $h$ drops from 1.0 to 0.6. The free (unrestrained) shrinkage strain rate is, approximately,

$\dot \epsilon_{sh} = k_{sh} \dot h$	7

where $k_{sh}$ = shrinkage coefficient. Since the $\dot \epsilon_{sh}$-values at various points are incompatible, the calculation of the overall shrinkage of structures as well as test specimens is a stress analysis problem, in which creep and cracking must be taken into account.

For finite element structural analysis in time steps, it is advantageous to convert the constitutive law to a rate-type form. This may be achieved by approximating $C_g(\theta)$ with a Kelvin chain model (or the associated relaxation function with a Maxwell chain model). The history integrals such as Eq. 1 then disappear from the constitutive law, the history being characterized by the current values of the internal state variables (the partial strains or stresses of the Kelvin or Maxwell chain).

Conversion to a rate-type form is also necessary for introducing the effect of variable temperature, which affects (according to the Arrhenius law) both the Kelvin chain viscosities and the rate of hydration, as captured by $t_e$. The former accelerates creep if the temperature is increased, and the latter decelerates creep. Three-dimensional tensorial generalization of Eqs. (3)-(7) is required for finite element analysis of structures.

== Approximate cross-section response at drying ==
Although multidimensional finite element calculations of creep and moisture diffusion are nowadays feasible, simplified one-dimensional analysis of concrete beams or girders based on the assumption of planar cross sections remaining planar still reigns in practice. Although (in box girder bridges) it involves deflection errors of the order of 30%. In that approach, one needs as input the average cross-sectional compliance function $\bar J(t,t',t_0)$ (Fig. 1 bottom, light curves) and average shrinkage function $\bar \epsilon_{sh}(t,t_0)$ of the cross section (Fig. 1 left and middle) ($t_0$ = age at start of drying). Compared to the point-wise constitutive equation, the algebraic expressions for such average characteristics are considerably more complicated and their accuracy is lower, especially if the cross section is not under centric compression. The following approximations have been derived and their coefficients optimized by fitting a large laboratory database for environmental humidities $h_e$ below 98%:

$\bar \epsilon_{sh}(t,t_0) = -\epsilon_{sh\infty}\ k_h\ S(t),~~~k_h = 1-{h_e}^3~~~~~$	8

$S(t) = \mbox{tanh} \sqrt{\frac{t-t_0}{\tau_{sh}}},~~~ \tau_{sh} = k_t (k_s D)^2~~~~~$	9

where $D=2v/s$ = effective thickness, $v/s$ = volume-to-surface ratio, $k_t$ = 1 for normal (type I) cement; $k_s$ = shape factor (e.g., 1.0 for a slab, 1.15 for a cylinder); and $\epsilon_{sh\infty} \approx \epsilon_{s\infty} E(607) / (E(t_0 + \tau_{sh})$, $\epsilon_{s\infty}$ = constant; $E(t) \approx E(28) \sqrt{4+0.85 t}$ (all times are in days). Eqs. (3) and (4) apply except that $1/\eta_f$ must be replaced by

$\frac 1 {\bar \eta_f} = \frac{q_4} t + q_5 \frac{\partial}{\partial t} \sqrt{ F(t) - F(t'_0) }$	10

where $F(t) = \exp\{ -8 [1-(1-h_e)S(t)] \}$ and $t'_0 = \max (t',t_0)$. The form of the expression for shrinkage halftime $\tau_{sh}$ is based on the diffusion theory. Function 'tanh' in Eq. 8 is the simplest function satisfying two asymptotic conditions ensuing from the diffusion theory: 1) for short times $\bar \epsilon_{sh} \propto \sqrt{t-t_0}$, and 2) the final shrinkage must be approached exponentially. Generalizations for the temperature effect exist, too.

Empirical formulae have been developed for predicting the parameter values in the foregoing equations on the basis of concrete strength and some parameters of the concrete mix. However, they are very crude, leading to prediction errors with the coefficients of variation of about 23% for creep and 34% for drying shrinkage. These high uncertainties can be drastically reduced by updating certain coefficients of the formulae according to short-time creep and shrinkage tests of the given concrete. For shrinkage, however, the weight loss of the drying test specimens must also be measured (or else the problem of updating $\epsilon_{sh\infty}$ is ill-conditioned). A fully rational prediction of concrete creep and shrinkage properties from its composition is a formidable problem, far from resolved satisfactorily.

== Engineering applications ==
The foregoing form of functions $J(t,t')$ and $\epsilon_{sh}(t)$ has been used in the design of structures of high creep sensitivity. Other forms have been introduced into the design codes and standard recommendations of engineering societies. They are simpler though less realistic, especially for multi-decade creep.

Creep and shrinkage can cause a major loss of prestress. Underestimation of multi-decade creep has caused excessive deflections, often with cracking, in many of large-span prestressed segmentally erected box girder bridges (over 60 cases documented). Creep may cause excessive stress and cracking in cable-stayed or arch bridges, and roof shells. Non-uniformity of creep and shrinkage, caused by differences in the histories of pore humidity and temperature, age and concrete type in various parts of a structures may lead to cracking. So may interactions with masonry or with steel parts, as in cable-stayed bridges and composite steel-concrete girders. Differences in column shortenings are of particular concern for very tall buildings. In slender structures, creep may cause collapse due to long-time instability.

The creep effects are particularly important for prestressed concrete structures (because of their slenderness and high flexibility), and are paramount in safety analysis of nuclear reactor containments and vessels. At high temperature exposure, as in fire or postulated nuclear reactor accidents, creep is very large and plays a major role.

In preliminary design of structures, simplified calculations may conveniently use the dimensionless creep coefficient $\varphi(t,t') = E(t') J(t,t') - 1$ = $\epsilon_{\mbox{creep}} / \epsilon_{\mbox{initial}}$. The change of structure state from time $t_1$ of initial loading to time $t$ can simply, though crudely, be estimated by quasi-elastic analysis in which Young's modulus $E$ is replaced by the so-called age-adjusted effective modulus $E''(t,t_1) = [E(t_1) - R(t,t_1)]/\varphi(t,t_1)$.

The best approach to computer creep analysis of sensitive structures is to convert the creep law to an incremental elastic stress–strain relation with an eigenstrain. Eq. (1) can be used but in that form the variations of humidity and temperature with time cannot be introduced and the need to store the entire stress history for each finite element is cumbersome. It is better to convert Eq. (1) to a set of differential equations based on the Kelvin chain rheologic model. To this end, the creep properties in each sufficiently small time step may be considered as non-aging, in which case a continuous spectrum of retardation moduli of Kelvin chain may be obtained from $J(t,t')$ by Widder's explicit formula for approximate Laplace transform inversion. The moduli $E_k(t)$ ($k=1,2,...n_E$) of the Kelvin units then follow by discretizing this spectrum. They are different for each integration point of each finite element in each time step. This way the creep analysis problem gets converted to a series of elastic structural analyses, each of which can be run on a commercial finite element program. For an example see the last reference below.

== See also ==
- Deformation (engineering)
