= Particle segregation =

Separation of particles by size in solids

In particle segregation, particulate solids, and also quasi-solids such as foams, tend to segregate by virtue of differences in the size, and also physical properties such as volume, density, shape and other properties of particles of which they are composed. Segregation occurs mainly during the powder handling and it is pronounced in free-flowing powders. One of the effective methods to control granular segregation is to make mixture's constituents sticky using a coating agent. This is especially useful when a highly active ingredient, like an enzyme, is present in the mixture. Powders that are inherently not free flowing and exhibit high levels of cohesion/adhesion between the compositions are sometimes difficult to mix as they tend to form agglomerates. The clumps of particles can be broken down in such cases by the use of mixtures that generate high shear forces or that subject the powder to impact. When these powders have been mixed, however, they are less susceptible to segregation because of the relatively high inter-particulate forces that resist inter-particulate motion, leading to unmixing.

Granular segregation is also called "demixing" in industrial environment.

== Segregation mechanisms ==
The five major segregation mechanisms are

- Percolation segregation
- Flotation segregation
- Elutriation
- Transport segregation
- Agglomeration segregation

=== Percolation ===
Sifting occurs when there is a significant variation of particle diameter in a mixture. Relative movement of particles causes the finer particles to sift through the coarser ones.

=== Flotation ===
Vibration of the mixture is bringing the small particles below the coarse one, which has as an effect to have coarse particles closer to the surface of the mixture.

=== Elutriation ===
In this mechanism, the lighter or fluffier particles form a 'fluidized' layer. Only coarser particles can penetrate the fluidized fines and the finer particles remain in the top layer.

=== Transport ===
The finer particles in a mix are susceptible to be airborne in the presence of airflow. They move away from the deposition point whereas the coarser particles tend to remain close to the deposition point.

=== Agglomeration ===
It can happen that some components form lumps. Those lumps will create non homogeneity in the mix since locally they will concentrate a lot of material of one case.
