= Fineness modulus =

The Fineness Modulus (FM) is an empirical figure obtained by adding the total percentage of the sample of an aggregate retained on each of a specified series of sieves, dividing the sum by 100. Sieves sizes are: 150-μm (No. 100), 300-μm (No. 50), 600-μm (No. 30), 1.18-mm (No. 16), 2.36-mm (No. 8), 4.75-mm (No. 4), 9.5-mm (3/8-in.), 19.0-mm (3/4-in.), 37.5-mm (11/2-in.), and larger, increasing in the ratio of 2 to 1. The same value of fineness modulus may therefore be obtained from several different particle size distributions. In general, however, a smaller value indicates a finer aggregate. Fine aggregates range from an FM of 2.00 to 4.00, and coarse aggregates smaller than 38.1 mm range from 6.75 to 8.00. Combinations of fine and coarse aggregates have intermediate values.

== Fineness modulus of combined aggregates ==
Fineness modulus of combined aggregates is always between the Fineness modulus of aggregates and combined modulus coarse aggregate have intermediate value. It is given by the formula.

$F=(F_1 \times Y + F_2 \times (1-Y))$

here

$F$ is resultant fineness modulus
$F_1$ is fineness modulus of fine aggregate
$F_2$ is fineness modulus of coarse aggregate
$Y$ is proportion of fine aggregate in combined aggregate

ratio X of fine aggregate on coarse aggregate in combined aggregate can be found by:

$X = \frac{F_2-F}{F-F_1}$

proportion of fine aggregate Y in percentage can be calculated by:

$Y = \frac{X}{1+X} \times 100$

Put X value

$Y = \frac{F_2-F}{F_2-F_1}\times 100$
