= Concrete slump test =

Measurement of workability of freshly mixed concrete

The concrete slump test measures the consistency of fresh concrete before it sets. It is performed to check the workability of freshly made concrete, and therefore the ease with which concrete flows. It can also be used as an indicator of an improperly mixed batch. The test is popular due to the simplicity of the apparatus and its use. The slump test is used to ensure uniformity for different loads of concrete under field conditions.

A separate test, known as the flow table, or slump-flow test, is used for concrete that is too fluid (non-workable) to be measured using the standard slump test, because the concrete will not retain its shape when the cone is removed.

== Procedure ==
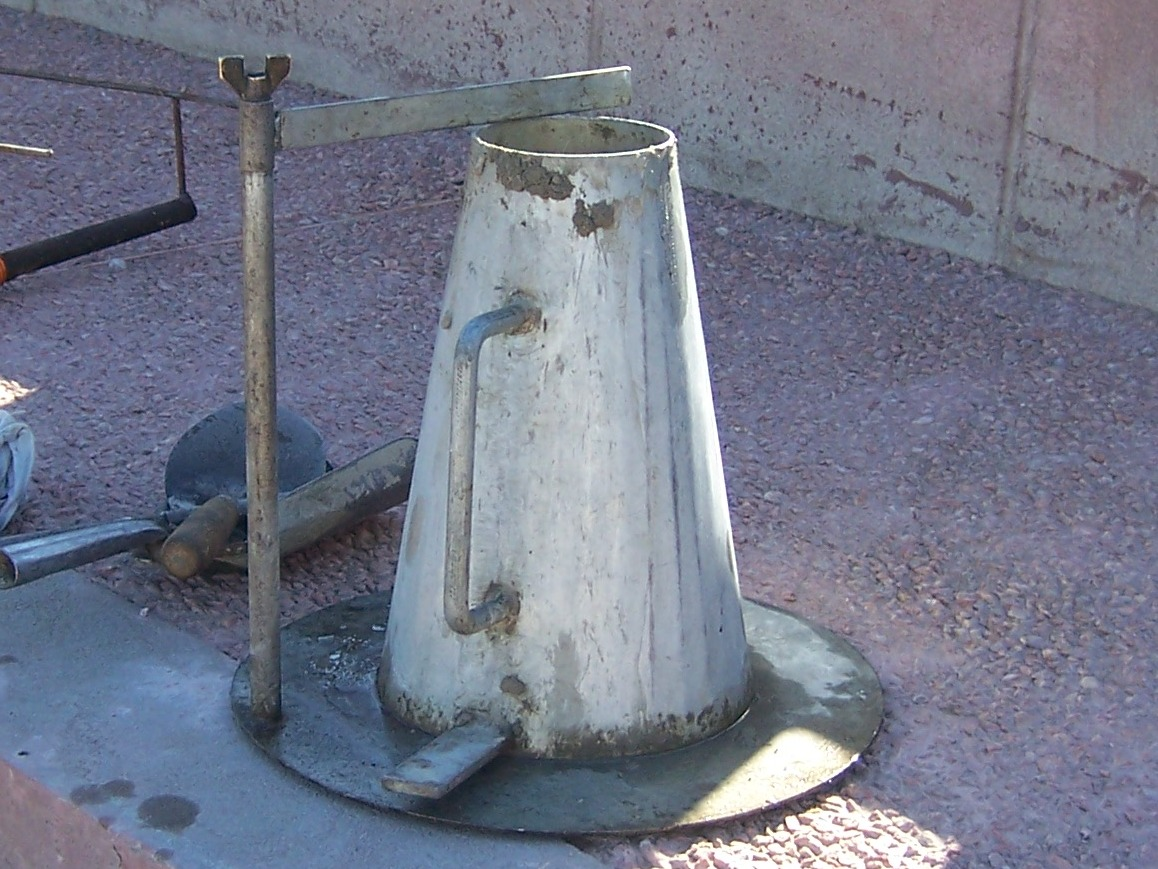
Slump cone

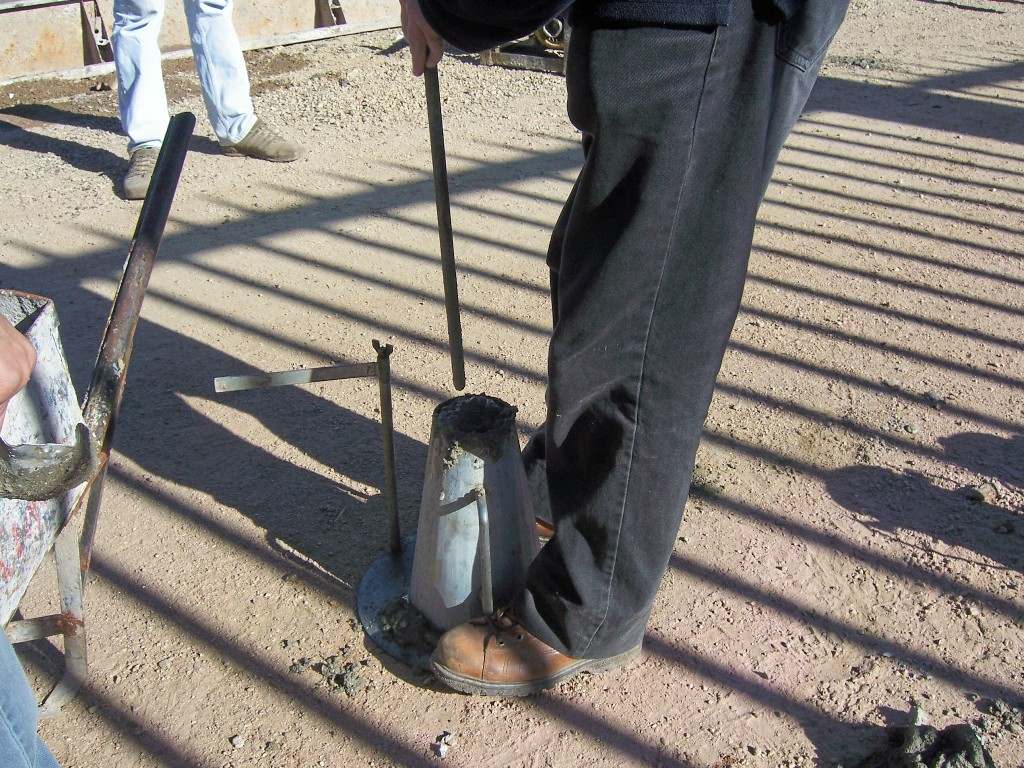
Tamping procedure

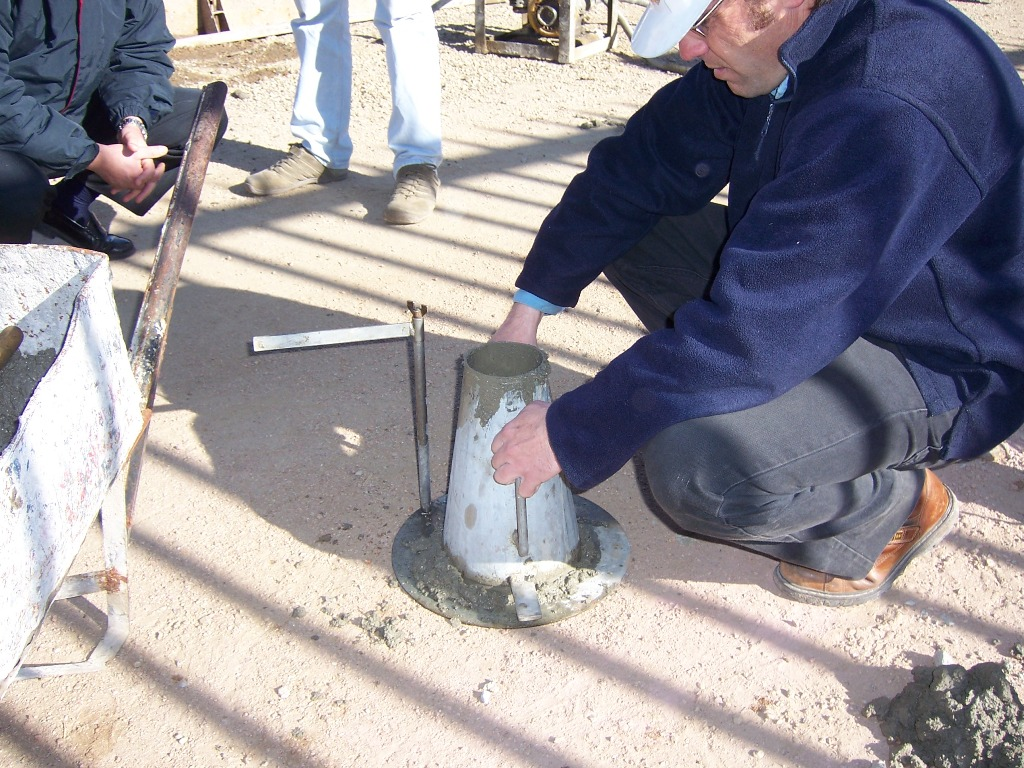
Removing cone

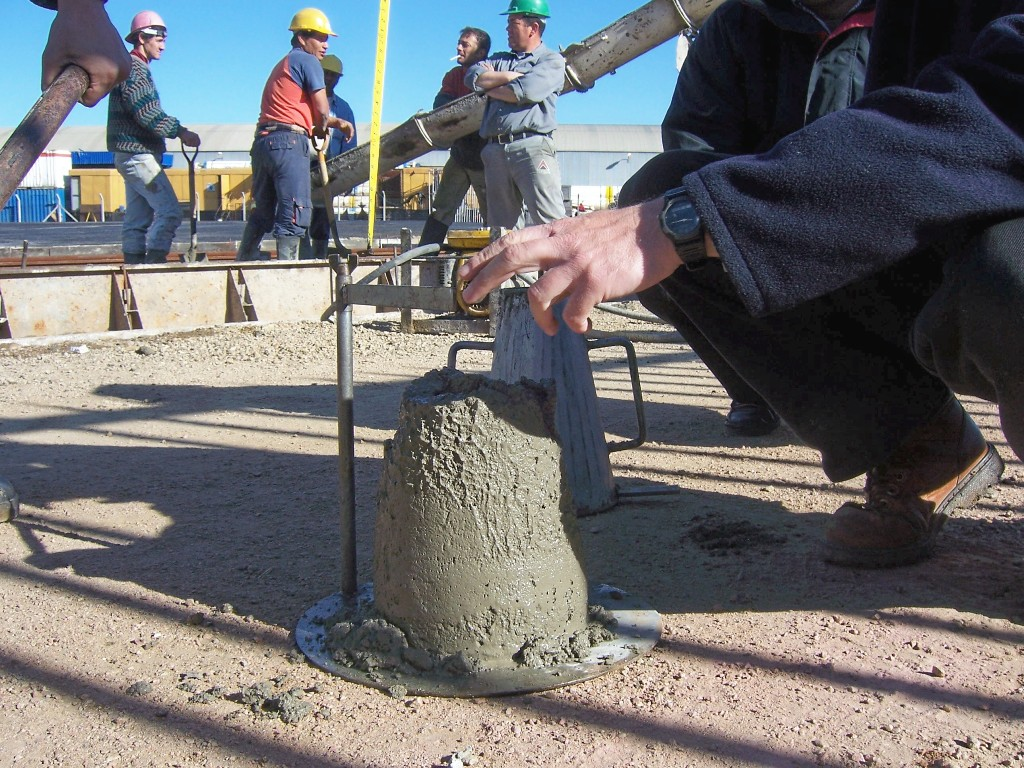
Height measurement

The test is carried out using a metal mould in the shape of a conical frustum known as a slump cone or Abrams cone, that is open at both ends and has attached handles. The tool typically has an internal diameter of 4 inches (100 mm) at the top and of 8 inches (200 mm) at the bottom with a height of 12 inches (300 mm).The cone is placed on a hard non-absorbent surface. This cone is filled with fresh concrete in three stages. Each time, each layer is tamped 25 times with a 2-foot (610 mm) long bullet-nosed metal rod measuring 5/8 inch (16 mm) in diameter. At the end of the third stage, the concrete is struck off flush with the top of the mould. The mould is carefully lifted vertically upwards, so as not to disturb the concrete cone.

The concrete then slumps (subsides). The slump of the concrete is measured by measuring the distance from the top of the slumped concrete to the level of the top of the slump cone.

== Interpretation of results ==
The slumped concrete takes various shapes and according to the profile of slumped concrete, the slump is termed as true slump, shear slump or collapse slump. If a shear or collapse slump is achieved, a fresh sample should be taken and the test repeated.

Only a true slump is of any use in the test. A collapse slump will generally mean that the mix is too wet or that it is a high workability mix, for which the slump test is not appropriate. Very dry mixes having slump 0 to 1 inch (0 to 25 mm) are typically used in constructing pavements or roads, low workability mixes having slump 0.4 to 1.6 inches (10 to 40 mm) are typically used for foundations with light reinforcement, medium workability mixes with slump 2.0 to 3.5 inches (50 to 90 mm), are typically used for normal reinforced concrete placed with vibration, high workability concrete with slump greater than 3.9 inches (100 mm) is typically used where reinforcing has tight spacing, or the concrete has to flow a great distance.

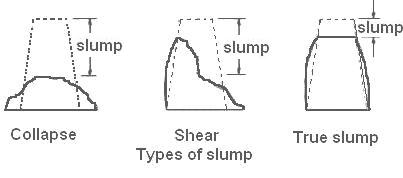
Types of slump

Collapse	Shear	True
In a collapse slump the concrete collapses completely.	In a shear slump the top portion of the concrete shears off and slips sideways.	In a true slump the concrete simply subsides, keeping more or less to shape.

== Limitations of the slump test ==
The slump test is suitable for slumps of medium to low workability, i.e., slump within the range of 0.2 to 10 inches (5 to 260 mm). The test fails to determine the difference in workability in stiff mixes which have zero slump, or for wet mixes that give a collapse slump. It is limited to concrete formed of aggregates of less than 1.5 inches (38 mm).

== Differences in standards ==
The slump test is referred to in several testing and building codes, with minor differences in the details of performing the test.

=== United States ===
In the United States, engineers use the ASTM C94, standard specification for ready-mixed concrete, and AASHTO specifications, address clump tolerances in detail. For diverse forms of concrete construction, different slumps are required. For example: for walls, slumps typically range from 4 to 8 inches (100 to 200 mm). The American standards explicitly state that the slump cone should have a height of 12 inches (300 mm), a bottom diameter of 8 inches (200 mm) and an upper diameter of 4 inches (100 mm). The soft SI conversions provided in the standard allow using the same dimension slump cones as those described in other standards. The ASTM standards also regulate the rigidity of the cone. It states in the procedure that when the cone is removed, it should be lifted up vertically, without any rotational movement at all. The concrete slump test is known as "Standard Test Method for Slump of Hydraulic-Cement Concrete" and carries the code (ASTM C 143) or (AASHTO T 119).

=== United Kingdom and mainland Europe ===
In the United Kingdom, the standards specify a slump cone height of 300 mm (12 in), a bottom diameter of 200 mm (7.9 in) and a top diameter of 100 mm (3.9 in). The British Standards do not explicitly specify that the cone should only be lifted vertically. The slump test in the British standards was first (BS 1881–102) and is now replaced by the European Standard (BS EN 12350–2). The test should be carried out by filling the slump cone in three equal layers with the mixture being tamped down 25 times for each layer.

== Other tests ==
There are many tests for evaluating slump in concrete: the flow table test (DIN 1048–1) uses similar, but differently-sized, apparatus, but the table on which the slump cone is placed is dropped several times after the slump cone is removed, and the measurement is of the diameter of the sample, not the height. one example is the K-Slump Test (ASTM International C1362-09 Standard Test Method for Flow of Freshly Mixed Hydraulic Cement Concrete). Other tests evaluating consistency are the British compacting factor test, the Vebe consistometer for roller-compacted concrete (ASTM C1170),

Another way of determining slump is to use an automated slump meter. Sensors and controls enable the meters to measure and display slump. Their reliability has by now earned them acceptance in various standard codes such as ASTM International. Some automated slump meters can add water to the concrete mix in the delivery truck while in transit. In 2013 ASTM C94/C94M was revised to allow water additions during transit for trucks equipped with automated slump monitoring and measurement systems.

== See also ==
- Flow table test
- Plasticity (physics)
- Superplasticizer
- Angle of repose
- Consistometer
