= Lignin =

Structural phenolic polymer in plant cell walls

Idealized structure of lignin from a softwood

Lignin is a class of complex organic polymers that form key structural materials in the support tissues of most plants. Lignins are particularly important in the formation of cell walls, especially in wood and bark, because they lend rigidity and do not rot easily. Chemically, lignins are polymers made by the cross-linking of phenolic precursors.

== History ==
Lignin was first mentioned in 1813 by the Swiss botanist A. P. de Candolle, who described it as a fibrous, tasteless material, insoluble in water and alcohol but soluble in weak alkaline solutions, and which can be precipitated from solution using acid. He named the substance "lignine", which is derived from the Latin word lignum, meaning wood. It is one of the most abundant organic polymers on Earth, exceeded only by cellulose and chitin. Lignin constitutes 30% of terrestrial non-fossil organic carbon on Earth, and 20 to 35% of the dry mass of wood.

Lignin is present in red algae, which suggest that the common ancestor of plants and red algae may have been pre-adapted to synthesize lignin. This finding also suggests that the original function of lignin may have been structural as it plays this role in the red alga Calliarthron, where it supports joints between calcified segments.

== Composition and structure ==
The composition of lignin varies from species to species. An example of composition from an aspen sample is 63.4% carbon, 5.9% hydrogen, 0.7% ash (mineral components), and 30% oxygen (by difference), corresponding approximately to the formula (C_{31}H_{34}O_{11})_{n}.

Lignin is a collection of highly heterogeneous polymers derived from a handful of precursor lignols. Heterogeneity arises from the diversity and degree of crosslinking between these lignols. The lignols that crosslink are of three main types, all derived from phenylpropene: coniferyl alcohol (3-methoxy-4-hydroxyphenylpropenol; its radical, G, is sometimes called guaiacyl), sinapyl alcohol (3,5-dimethoxy-4-hydroxyphenylpropenol; its radical, S, is sometimes called syringyl), and paracoumaryl alcohol (4-hydroxyphenylpropenol; its radical, H, is sometimes called 4-hydroxyphenyl).

The relative amounts of the precursor "monomers" (lignols or monolignols) vary according to the plant source. Lignins are typically classified according to their syringyl/guaiacyl (S/G) ratio. Lignin from gymnosperms is derived from the coniferyl alcohol, which gives rise to G upon pyrolysis. In angiosperms some of the coniferyl alcohol is converted to S. Thus, lignin in angiosperms has both G and S components.

Lignin's molecular masses exceed 10,000 u. It is hydrophobic as it is rich in aromatic subunits. The degree of polymerisation is difficult to measure, since the material is heterogeneous. Different types of lignin have been described depending on the means of isolation.

The three common monolignols: 1. paracoumaryl alcohol, H; 2. coniferyl alcohol, G; 3. sinapyl alcohol, S

Many grasses have mostly G, while some palms have mainly S. All lignins contain small amounts of incomplete or modified monolignols, and other monomers are prominent in non-woody plants.

== Biological function ==
Lignin fills the spaces in the cell wall between cellulose, hemicellulose, and pectin components, especially in vascular and support tissues: xylem tracheids, vessel elements and sclereid cells.

Lignin plays a crucial part in conducting water and aqueous nutrients in plant stems. The polysaccharide components of plant cell walls are highly hydrophilic and thus permeable to water, whereas lignin is more hydrophobic. The crosslinking of polysaccharides by lignin is an obstacle for water absorption to the cell wall. Thus, lignin makes it possible for the plant's vascular tissue to conduct water efficiently. Lignin is present in all vascular plants, but not in bryophytes, supporting the idea that the original function of lignin was restricted to water transport.

It is covalently linked to hemicellulose and therefore cross-links different plant polysaccharides, conferring mechanical strength to the cell wall and by extension the plant as a whole. Its most commonly noted function is the support through strengthening of wood (mainly composed of xylem cells and lignified sclerenchyma fibres) in vascular plants.

Finally, lignin also confers disease resistance by accumulating at the site of pathogen infiltration, making the plant cell less accessible to cell wall degradation.

== Delignification ==
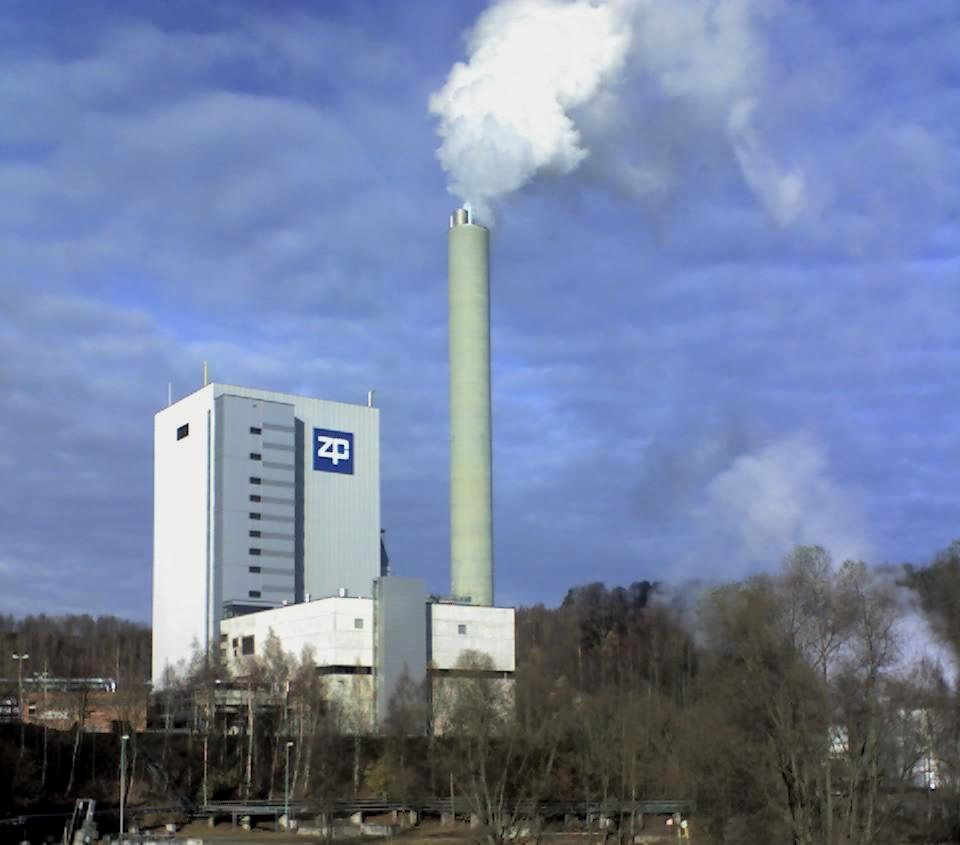
In pulp mills (like this one in Blankenstein, Germany) using the kraft or the sulfite process, lignin is removed from lignocellulose to yield pulp for papermaking.

The pulp and paper industry is heavily focused on the removal of lignin from woody and some related plants. Roughly 30% of wood is lignin, the remainder being cellulose, the main component of paper, and a lesser amount of hemicellulose. Only a fraction of the lignin recovered in paper making is used. A wide range of low volume applications have been proposed, where the form but not the quality is important.

Delignification is achieved by "cooking" wood chips in a solution of various chemicals. In the Kraft process, which is the dominant technology, an aqueous solution of sodium sulfide and sodium hydroxide is used. Lignin removed in this way is usually burned to power the paper mill. The sulfide, or more accurately the hydrosulfide (SH^{-}), depolymerizes the lignin. A characteristic of the Kraft process is the formation of dimethyl sulfide and related odoriferous organosulfur compounds. In Sulfite pulping, sulfite salts are used to delignify. This technology cogenerates lignosulfonates. Paper from the Kraft process retains some lignin and is consequently brownish. Less strong than the Kraft product is sulfite paper, which is white.

Many applications have been proposed for lignosulfonates. They are used as dispersants, humectants, emulsion stabilizers, and sequestrants (water treatment). Lignosulfonate has been investigated as a water reducers or superplasticizers for concrete.

Given that it is the most prevalent biopolymer after cellulose, lignin has been investigated as a feedstock for biofuel production.

== Biosynthesis ==
Lignin biosynthesis begins in the cytosol with the synthesis of glycosylated monolignols from the amino acid phenylalanine. These first reactions are shared with the phenylpropanoid pathway. The attached glucose renders them water-soluble and less toxic. Once transported through the cell membrane to the apoplast, the glucose is removed, and the polymerisation commences. Much about its anabolism is not understood even after more than a century of study.

Initial stages in the formation of lignin from coniferyl alcohol. The reaction is catalysed by oxidative enzymes, peroxidases or oxidases. Lignan is a precursor to lignin.

The polymerisation step, that is a radical-radical coupling, is catalysed by oxidative enzymes. Both peroxidase and laccase enzymes are present in the plant cell walls, and it is not known whether one or both of these groups participates in the polymerisation. Low molecular weight oxidants might also be involved. The oxidative enzyme catalyses the formation of monolignol radicals. These radicals are often said to undergo uncatalyzed coupling to form the lignin polymer. An alternative theory invokes an unspecified biological control.

== Biodegradation ==
In contrast to other bio-polymers (e.g. proteins, DNA, and even cellulose), lignin resists degradation. It is immune to both acid- and base-catalyzed hydrolysis. The degradability varies with species and plant tissue type. For example, syringyl (S) lignin is more susceptible to degradation by fungal decay as it has fewer aryl-aryl bonds and a lower redox potential than guaiacyl units. Because it is cross-linked with the other cell wall components, lignin minimizes the accessibility of cellulose and hemicellulose to microbial enzymes (e.g. Steric hindrance), leading to a reduced digestibility of biomass.

Some ligninolytic enzymes include heme peroxidases such as lignin peroxidases, manganese peroxidases, versatile peroxidases, and dye-decolourizing peroxidases as well as copper-based laccases. Lignin peroxidases oxidize non-phenolic lignin, whereas manganese peroxidases only oxidize the phenolic structures. Dye-decolorizing peroxidases, or DyPs, exhibit catalytic activity on a wide range of lignin model compounds, but their in vivo substrate is unknown. In general, laccases oxidize phenolic substrates but some fungal laccases have been shown to oxidize non-phenolic substrates in the presence of synthetic redox mediators.

=== Lignin degradation by fungi ===
Well-studied ligninolytic enzymes are found in Phanerochaete chrysosporium and other white rot fungi. Some white rot fungi, such as Ceriporiopsis subvermispora, can degrade the lignin in lignocellulose, but others lack this ability. Most fungal lignin degradation involves secreted peroxidases. Many fungal laccases are also secreted, which facilitate degradation of phenolic lignin-derived compounds, although several intracellular fungal laccases have also been described. An important aspect of fungal lignin degradation is the activity of accessory enzymes to produce the H_{2}O_{2} required for the function of lignin peroxidase and other heme peroxidases.

=== Lignin degradation by bacteria ===
Bacteria lack most of the enzymes employed by fungi to degrade lignin, and lignin derivatives (aliphatic acids, furans, and solubilized phenolics) inhibit the growth of bacteria. Yet, bacterial degradation can be quite extensive, especially in aquatic systems such as lakes, rivers, and streams, where inputs of terrestrial material (e.g. leaf litter) can enter waterways. The ligninolytic activity of bacteria has not been studied extensively even though it was first described in 1930. Many bacterial DyPs have been characterized. Bacteria do not express any of the plant-type peroxidases (lignin peroxidase, Mn peroxidase, or versatile peroxidases), but three of the four classes of DyP are only found in bacteria. In contrast to fungi, most bacterial enzymes involved in lignin degradation are intracellular, including two classes of DyP and most bacterial laccases.

In the environment, lignin can be degraded either biotically via bacteria or abiotically via photochemical alteration, and oftentimes the latter assists in the former. In addition to the presence or absence of light, several of environmental factors affect the biodegradability of lignin, including bacterial community composition, mineral associations, and redox state.

In shipworms, the lignin it ingests is digested by "Alteromonas-like sub-group" bacteria symbionts in the typhlosole sub-organ of its cecum.

== Pyrolysis ==
Pyrolysis of lignin during the combustion of wood or charcoal production yields a range of products, of which the most characteristic ones are methoxy-substituted phenols. Of those, the most important are guaiacol and syringol and their derivatives. Their presence can be used to trace a smoke source to a wood fire. In cooking, lignin in the form of hardwood is an important source of these two compounds, which impart the characteristic aroma and taste to smoked foods such as barbecue. The main flavor compounds of smoked ham are guaiacol, and its 4-, 5-, and 6-methyl derivatives as well as 2,6-dimethylphenol. These compounds are produced by thermal breakdown of lignin in the wood used in the smokehouse.

== Chemical analysis ==
The conventional method for lignin quantitation in the pulp industry is the Klason lignin and acid-soluble lignin test, which is standardized procedures. The cellulose is digested thermally in the presence of acid. The residue is termed Klason lignin. Acid-soluble lignin (ASL) is quantified by the intensity of its Ultraviolet spectroscopy. The carbohydrate composition may be also analyzed from the Klason liquors, although there may be sugar breakdown products (furfural and 5-hydroxymethylfurfural).

A solution of hydrochloric acid and phloroglucinol is used for the detection of lignin (Wiesner test). A brilliant red color develops, owing to the presence of coniferaldehyde groups in the lignin.

Thioglycolysis is an analytical technique for lignin quantitation. Lignin structure can also be studied by computational simulation.

Thermochemolysis (chemical break down of a substance under vacuum and at high temperature) with tetramethylammonium hydroxide (TMAH) or cupric oxide has also been used to characterize lignins. The ratio of syringyl lignol (S) to vanillyl lignol (V) and cinnamyl lignol (C) to vanillyl lignol (V) is variable based on plant type and can therefore be used to trace plant sources in aquatic systems (woody vs. non-woody and angiosperm vs. gymnosperm). Ratios of carboxylic acid (Ad) to aldehyde (Al) forms of the lignols (Ad/Al) reveal diagenetic information, with higher ratios indicating a more highly degraded material. Increases in the (Ad/Al) value indicate an oxidative cleavage reaction has occurred on the alkyl lignin side chain which has been shown to be a step in the decay of wood by many white-rot and some soft rot fungi.

Lignin and its models have been well examined by ^{1}H and ^{13}C NMR spectroscopy. Owing to the structural complexity of lignins, the spectra are poorly resolved and quantitation is challenging.

== See also ==
- Carboniferous period
- Coal formation
