= Water reducer =

Water reducers are special chemical products added to a concrete mixture before it is poured. They are from the same family of products as retarders. The first class of water reducers was the lignosulfonates which has been used since the 1930s. These inexpensive products were derived from wood and paper industry, but are now advantageously replaced by other synthetic sulfonate and polycarboxylate, also known as superplasticizers.

Water reducers offer several advantages in their use, listed below:

- reduces the water content by 5-10%
- decreases the concrete porosity
- increases the concrete strength by up to 25% (as less water is required for the concrete mixture to remain workable)
- increases the workability (assuming the amount of free water remains constant)
- reduces the water permeability (due to less water being used)
- reduces the diffusivity of aggressive agents in the concrete and so improves the durability of concrete
- gives a better finish to surfaces (due to all of the above)

== See also ==
- Plasticizer
- Superplasticizer
- Cement
- Admixture
