= Master Builders Solutions =

German manufacturer of construction products

Master Builders Solutions Holdings GmbH
- Company type: GmbH
- Industry: Construction chemicals
- Founded: 1909
- Headquarters: Mannheim, Germany
- Key people: Dr. Boris Gorella (CEO and Chairman of the Board); Ib Jensen (CFO); Dr. Karsten Eller (COO)
- Number of employees: >1,900 Worldwide
- Website: https://master-builders-solutions.com/en-gb

Master Builders Solutions Holdings GmbH, headquartered in Mannheim, Germany, is a manufacturer of construction chemical products and special building solutions. A portfolio of concrete admixtures, cement additives, underground construction products, construction systems, and other innovative solutions for the construction industry is bundled under the Master Builders Solutions brand.

Founded in 1909, the company operates 43 production sites across North and South America, Europe, Asia, Australia, and New Zealand. Master Builders Solutions employs about 1,900 individuals worldwide. During the 2024 financial year, the company had total sales of around 900 million euros.

Since May 2023, ownership of the Master Builders Solutions Holding has been held by the international private equity firm Cinven.

== History ==
The history of the company dates to 1909, when the chemist S.W. Flesheim founded Master Builders Inc. in Cleveland, Ohio. He aimed to offer products for the construction industry. In the 1930s, during the Great Depression, buildings for sports, art and alternative forms of social contact became important gathering places for many people. Master Builders played a role in this era by advancing concrete technology with the introduction of the first commercial water-reducing admixture in 1931, Pozzolith (sodium lignosulfonate). This innovation improved the quality and durability of concrete construction and reflected a shift in the industry. Pozzolith was also used in the construction of the famous Hoover Dam in 1932.

The success of Master Builders caught the attention of the American-Marietta Co. and led to the acquisition of the company in 1950. The acquisition was a strategic approach to expanding the company's own building materials portfolio. The company invested around 10 million dollars in a new technology centre in Beachwood, Ohio, in 1977, which focused on concrete analysis and testing.

During the 1980s, the construction chemicals business underwent various transitions. In 2006, the chemical company BASF AG acquired the construction chemicals business including production sites and distribution centres in over 50 countries as well as the current global research and development centre in Trostberg, Germany. In 2013, the umbrella brand Master Builders Solutions was introduced, consolidating all existing brands within the division. BASF announced the divestiture of its construction chemicals division to private equity firm Lone Star Funds in 2020 under the name MBCC Group. The Swiss chemicals group Sika bought the MBCC Group. Sika then sold the core sector of MBCC’s chemicals business with concrete admixtures, cement additives, and solutions for underground construction to the international private equity firm Cinven as of May 3, 2023.

== International expansion ==
In 2024, Master Builders Solutions Holdings GmbH expanded its operations by acquiring the Spanish company Adril Traders S.L., thereby strengthening its position in the European market for synthetic fiber technologies. In the same year, the company introduced two new brands, MB Trading in Mexico and MBT Construction Chemicals in India, as part of its regional expansion strategy. At the end of 2024, Master Builders Solutions acquired a 51% stake in the Turkish joint-stock company MBT Teknik Yapı Kimyasalları Sanayi ve Ticaret A.Ş. (short: MBT Tech) and established a joint venture to further strengthen its global presence. MBT Tech manufactures construction chemicals such as mortars, grouts, tile adhesives and waterproofing solutions for the Turkish market.

In early 2025, the company announced its entry into the Brazilian market and into Panama. This was followed in July by the acquisition of the Rapid Mix Group, an Italian manufacturer of mortars, screeds, and other construction chemical products. In September, the company expanded its international presence with the acquisition of Brexton Dominicana, S.A.S., a Dominican Republic–based company specialising in concrete admixtures.

== Research and development ==
The company's research and development initiatives focus on advancements in construction chemistry. With over 300 experts worldwide, spread across 3 R&D centres and numerous local laboratories, the focus is on developing responsible solutions that enhance the performance of construction materials and contribute to CO_{2} emission reduction. In 2024, the Master Builders Solutions Holding allocated over 3% of its turnover to R&D, resulting in around 80 ongoing pipeline projects.

One notable innovation is the superplasticizer MasterCO_{2}re, facilitating the use of clinker-reduced cement types in concrete production and achieving substantial CO_{2} savings up to 50%.
