= Antimicrobial textile finish =

An antimicrobial textile finish is a treatment designed to inhibit microbial growth or inactivate microorganisms on fabrics. The finishes are used in clothing, household textiles, medical fabrics, food packaging, and protective equipment to reduce microbial contamination, odor formation, and material deterioration. Antimicrobial agents can be applied as surface coatings, chemically bonded to textile fibers, or incorporated into fibers during manufacture. These agents include metal-based compounds, synthetic organic chemicals, and naturally derived polymers.

Antimicrobial finishes act through several mechanisms, including the release of metal ions or organic compounds that disrupt microbial cellular processes, direct interactions with microbial cell membranes that compromise their activity, and the generation of reactive oxygen species (ROS) that cause oxidative damage to cellular components. Their effectiveness depends on the chemical properties of the antimicrobial agent, its accessibility to microorganisms, and the composition of textile fibers. Environmental conditions and the finish's resistance to washing and wear also affect its performance.

== Overview and applications ==
Textiles can retain moisture and organic matter, including perspiration residues and skin oils, that support microbial survival and growth. Under suitable conditions, microorganisms can metabolize these substances and produce volatile compounds associated with unpleasant odors. Microbial activity can also contribute to discoloration and fiber deterioration. Antimicrobial finishing is intended to limit these effects by inhibiting microbial growth or reducing the number of viable microorganisms on the fabric.

Applications include apparel, household fabrics, medical textiles, and industrial materials. In clothing and sportswear, antimicrobial treatments commonly target odor-producing microorganisms, whereas those applied to medical textiles and personal protective equipment (PPE) are intended to reduce microbial contamination of textile surfaces.

Antimicrobial finishes may be classified according to their chemical composition, application method, or mechanism of antimicrobial activity. These classification criteria are not mutually exclusive; for example, a silver-containing coating is a metal-based finish whose antimicrobial activity may involve the release of silver ions (Ag^{+}).

== Antimicrobial materials ==
Antimicrobial textile finishes employ a range of materials, including organic compounds, polymers, inorganic particles, and hybrid materials that combine organic and inorganic components. Some formulations incorporate nanomaterials, whose small dimensions and surface properties can influence their interactions with microorganisms and textile fibers.

=== Metals and metal oxides ===
Silver is incorporated into antimicrobial textiles as nanoparticles, silver salts, or silver-loaded zeolites. Zeolites are porous aluminosilicate materials that can retain and release silver ions (Ag⁺) through ion exchange. Silver nanoparticles can also release Ag⁺ through oxidation of metallic silver. The availability of silver ions depends on the chemical form of silver, the surrounding chemical environment, and its distribution within the textile finish.

Metal oxides investigated for antimicrobial textile finishing include zinc oxide (ZnO), titanium dioxide (TiO₂), and copper oxides. ZnO can release zinc ions (Zn²⁺), participate in oxidative reactions, and interact with microbial cell surfaces. TiO₂ is used in photocatalytic finishes, where absorption of sufficient light energy initiates reactions that can generate reactive oxygen species and damage microbial cellular components. Copper-containing materials may release copper ions and participate in oxidation-reduction (redox) reactions that contribute to microbial inactivation. Certain metal-oxide coatings also provide ultraviolet (UV) protection or photocatalytic self-cleaning properties, although these functions are distinct from antimicrobial activity.

The antimicrobial performance of metallic nanoparticles depends on several physical and chemical properties. Smaller particles generally have a greater surface-area-to-volume ratio than larger particles of similar shape, which can influence dissolution rates and surface reactivity. Crystal structure, surface chemistry, particle aggregation, and the surrounding chemical environment also affect interactions with microorganisms. Particle size alone, therefore, does not determine antimicrobial effectiveness.

=== Synthetic organic agents ===
Quaternary ammonium compounds (QACs) are antimicrobial agents containing a positively charged nitrogen atom bonded to four organic groups, often including one or more long, nonpolar hydrocarbon chains. The positive charge promotes electrostatic attraction to negatively charged microbial cell surfaces, while the hydrophobic chains can interact with membrane lipids, disrupting membrane organization and increasing permeability. QACs can be chemically attached to textile fibers to provide contact-active antimicrobial properties, or incorporated into coatings that allow their release over time. Their overall effectiveness depends on their molecular structure and their accessibility to microorganisms.

Other synthetic antimicrobial agents include polyhexamethylene biguanide (PHMB) and N-halamine compounds. PHMB is a polymer containing repeating biguanide groups, nitrogen-rich chemical units that can carry positive charges and interact with microbial cell membranes. N-halamines contain nitrogen-halogen (N-X) bonds that can participate in oxidation reactions and damage microbial cellular components. Certain N-halamine finishes can be regenerated through treatment with an appropriate halogenating agent, restoring antimicrobial nitrogen-halogen bonds after their antimicrobial activity has been depleted.

Representative synthetic organic antimicrobial agents used in textile finishing. Chemical structures of (a) a quaternary ammonium compound (QAC), (b) polyhexamethylene biguanide (PHMB), and (c) representative N-halamine compounds. The structures illustrate the quatenary ammonium center, repeating biguanide units, and nitrogen-halogen (N-X) bonds characteristic of these antimicrobial agents. The specific nitrogen substituents and halogen atoms vary among N-halamine compounds.

=== Biopolymers and naturally derived agents ===
Chitosan is a naturally derived polysaccharide produced from chitin, a structural polymer found in crustacean shells and fungal cell walls. Its repeating sugar units contain amino groups (-NH₂) that can accept a hydrogen ion (H⁺) under acidic conditions to form positively charged ammonium groups (-NH₃⁺). This process, known as protonation, promotes electrostatic interactions between chitosan and negatively charged microbial cell surfaces, contributing to its antimicrobial activity. Chitosan's antimicrobial effectiveness depends partly on its molecular weight (generally reflects the length of its polymer chains), and the pH of the surrounding environment, as pH influences the degree of protonation. Chitosan's durability on textiles also depends on the strength of chemical attachments to the fibers.

Chitosan coatings can be chemically crosslinked, a process that forms bonds between polymer chains to improve the coating's stability and retention on fabric. Chitosan can also be combined with inorganic materials, such as silver nanoparticles or metal oxides, to modify antimicrobial activity and coating durability. Such combinations may provide multiple antimicrobial mechanisms, although the presence of multiple agents does not necessarily result in a synergistic effect.

Other naturally derived materials investigated for antimicrobial textile finishing include essential oils from clove and thyme, curcumin from turmeric, and seaweed-derived polymers such as alginate. Clove and thyme oils contain antimicrobial compounds, such as eugenol and thymol, that can disrupt cell membranes. Because essential oils are volatile and have generally low water solubility, they may be formulated as emulsions or encapsulated to improve their retention on textiles and regulate their release. Curcumin has also been studied as a light-activated antimicrobial agent capable of generating reactive oxygen species (ROS) upon illumination. Alginate, a polysaccharide extracted from brown algae, can form coatings that retain antimicrobial particles or compounds on textile fibers.

Representative protonated chitosan structure. Segment of a chitosan chain showing protonated amino groups (-NH₃⁺), highlighted in blue. The degree of protonation depends on the surrounding pH and influences electrostatic interactions with negatively charged microbial surfaces.

=== Carbon-based and hybrid materials ===
Carbon-based nanomaterials, including carbon nanotubes and graphene derivatives, have been investigated for antimicrobial textile coatings. Their antimicrobial activity has been attributed to physical damage of microbial cell membranes and oxidative stress caused by reactive chemical species that can damage cellular components. These effects depend on properties such as particle dimensions, the shape and arrangement of exposed surfaces, and surface chemistry. For example, exposed edges of graphene sheets may damage microbial membranes through physical contact, while oxygen-containing functional groups on graphene oxide influence its dispersion in water interactions with coating polymers.

Carbon nanomaterials can also be combined with polymers or inorganic nanoparticles to form hybrid coatings. In these formulations, the carbon material may provide a surface for distributing or retaining antimicrobial particles, while incorporated metal-containing agents may release antimicrobial ions.

== Mechanisms of antimicrobial action ==
Antimicrobial textile finishes can inhibit microbial growth or inactivate microorganisms through the release of antimicrobial substances, oxidative damage to cellular components, direct interactions with microbial cell envelopes, or light-activated processes. The relative contribution of these mechanisms depends on the chemical properties of the antimicrobial agent, its distribution and accessibility within the textile finish, and environmental factors such as moisture, temperature, light exposure, and duration of microbial contact.

=== Release of antimicrobial agents ===
Some antimicrobial finishes release metal ions or organic compounds into moisture present on or around textile fibers. These substances can diffuse through the surrounding liquid and reach microorganisms at or near the fabric surface, where they interfere with cellular functions.

Silver ions (Ag⁺), for example, can bind to sulfur-containing functional groups in microbial proteins, including thiol groups associated with cysteine residues. These interactions can alter protein structure and, consequently, disrupt with enzyme-dependent cellular processes. Copper ions can also interact with microbial membranes and proteins, while redox reactions involving copper can contribute to oxidative damage within microbial cells.

The availability of antimicrobial substances depends on processes such as dissolution, ion exchange, and diffusion through the surrounding coating. These processes influence both the amount of antimicrobial agent reaching microorganisms and the rate at which the finish loses its active material. As a result, release-based finishes must balance antimicrobial availability with the retention of active substances during use.

=== Oxidative damage and photocatalysis ===
Reactive oxygen species (ROS) are oxygen-derived chemical species capable of participating in oxidation reactions. They include superoxide, hydrogen peroxide, hydroxyl radicals, and singlet oxygen. Although their chemical reactivity varies, ROS can damage microbial membrane lipids, proteins, and nucleic acids, potentially disrupting cellular function. Certain metal-containing antimicrobial finishes can promote ROS formation through reactions at particle surfaces, including light-driven processes known as photocatalysis.

Titanium dioxide (TiO₂) nanoparticles have been investigated for photocatalytic textile coatings with antimicrobial and self-cleaning properties. When TiO₂ absorbs light with sufficient energy, electrons are excited to a higher-energy state, leaving behind positively charged vacancies called holes. These electrons and holes can participate in reactions with oxygen and water at the particle surface, generating ROS. Anatase, a crystalline form of TiO₂, is primarily activated by ultraviolet (UV) light because its band gap, the energy required to excite an electron from the valence band to the conduction band, is too large for most visible light to provide Chemical modifications can extend its response into the visible light, although this does not necessarily ensure substantial antimicrobial activity under ordinary indoor lighting. Photocatalytic effectiveness therefore depends on the available light, coating composition, and surrounding chemical environment.

=== Contact-active finishes ===
Contact-active finishes retain antimicrobial functional groups at the textile surface, rather than relying primarily on their release into the surrounding environment. These groups can interact directly with microorganisms upon contact with the treated fabric.

For example, immobilized quaternary ammonium compounds (QACs) contain positively charged groups that are electrostatically attracted to the negatively charged microbial cell surfaces. Their hydrophobic chains can interact with membrane lipids, disrupting membrane organization and increasing permeability. Antimicrobial effectiveness depends on the accessibility of these functional groups to microorganisms.

Engineered nanostructured surfaces may also cause microbial damage through direct physical interactions. Surface features such as nanopillars can deform microbial cell envelopes, generating mechanical stress that may contribute to membrane rupture. This effect depends on the dimensions and arrangement of the surface features and is distinct from antimicrobial activity caused by chemical reactions or the release of active substances.

Contact-active antimicrobial activity of N-halamine-functionalized cotton. Cotton fibers modified with an N-halamine precursor are treated with sodium hypochlorite (NaOCl), converting nitrogen-hydrogen (N-H) groups into antimicrobial nitrogen-chlorine (N-Cl) groups. These groups remain attached to the textile surface and can oxidize microbial cellular components upon contact, contributing to microbial inactivation and conversion of N-Cl groups back to N-H. Antimicrobial N-Cl groups can subsequently be regenerated by treatment with NaOCl. Microbial interactions are shown schematically.

=== Light-activated processes ===
Light-responsive antimicrobial finishes contain materials that generate reactive oxygen species (ROS) or heat upon exposure to suitable wavelengths of light. In photodynamic processes, photosensitizers absorb light and undergo energy- or electron-transfer reactions that lead to ROS formation, potentially damaging microbial cellular components. In contrast, photothermal materials convert absorbed light energy into heat, which can increase the temperature of the treated surface and cause thermal injury to microorganisms.

The effectiveness of both mechanisms depends on the wavelength and intensity of illumination, as well as exposure duration; photothermal activity additionally depends on the temperature reached by the treated textile.

== Application and attachment methods ==
Antimicrobial agents can be applied to existing textiles as surface treatments or incorporated into fibers during manufacture. The application method influences the distribution of antimicrobial agents within or on the fibers and their retention during laundering and wear. This architecture affects whether antimicrobial activity occurs through direct contact with the treated surface, or the release of active substances into the surrounding environment.

=== Fiber chemistry and surface preparation ===
The chemical composition of textile fibers influences how antimicrobial agents can be attached to their surfaces. Cellulose-based fibers, including cotton, contain hydroxyl (-OH) groups that participate in hydrogen bonding and covalent reactions. For example, polycarboxylic acids, such as citric acid and 1,2,3,4-butanetetracarboxylic acid, can react with cellulose hydroxyl groups under suitable curing conditions to form covalent ester bonds. These reactions can modify cellulose surface or create crosslinks between cellulose chains.

Other textile fibers differ in their available functional groups and methods of surface modifications. Protein-based fibers, including wool and silk, contain amino acid functional groups that can interact with antimicrobial compounds or coordinate metal ions. In contrast, polyester has fewer accessible reactive groups for conventional aqueous finishing than cellulose. Treatments such as plasma activation or alkaline hydrolysis can modify the polyester surface, improving its wettability and adhesion to subsequently applied antimicrobial coatings.

=== Surface deposition ===
Antimicrobial formulations can be applied to existing fabrics through padding, dipping, spraying, or printing. These methods deposit antimicrobial agents onto fiber surfaces or within accessible regions of the textile structure.

To improve coating retention, finishing formulations may contain polymeric binders that help attach antimicrobial particles or compounds to textile fibers. During drying or curing, these binders can form a thin film that improves adhesion and resistance to laundering. However, excessive binder coverage may obstruct contact between microorganisms and surface-bound agents, or restrict the diffusion of released antimicrobial ions. Binder selection and concentration, therefore, influence both coating durability and the availability of antimicrobial agents.

=== Sol-gel processing ===
Sol-gel processing is a chemical method used to form thin inorganic or hybrid coatings on textile fibers. In silica-based treatments, silicon-containing precursors called alkoxysilanes react with water through hydrolysis, followed by condensation reactions that form a network of silicon-oxygen-silicon (Si-O-Si) bonds. This network can retain antimicrobial agents, such as silver nanoparticles, within a coating on the fibers. The coating's porosity influences water penetration, and the diffusion of released silver ions (Ag⁺) can move into the surrounding environment.

=== Layer-by-layer assembly ===
Layer-by-layer (LbL) assembly is a coating method based on the successive deposition of thin layers onto textile fibers. These layers commonly consist of oppositely charged polymers that attract one another through electrostatic interactions, allowing the coating to build up on the fabric surface. Antimicrobial agents, including silver nanoparticles or positively charged polymers, can be incorporated into the coating. Adjusting the number and composition of deposited layers can influence coating thickness and the accessibility or release of antimicrobial agents.

Because the layers are often held together by electrostatic interactions, repeated laundering can destabilize or partially remove the coating. Chemical crosslinking, which forms bonds between polymer chains, can improve coating stability and retention during washing.

=== Incorporation during fiber manufacture ===
Antimicrobial agents can be incorporated directly into synthetic fibers by mixing them with a polymer before fiber extrusion. In melt blending, additives are dispersed in a molten polymer, whereas solution blending involves mixing the agent(s) with a polymer dissolved in a suitable solvent. Both approaches can distribute antimicrobial materials, such as silver nanoparticles or zinc oxide (ZnO), throughout the resulting fibers. Unlike surface-applied coatings, embedded particles do not rely primarily on adhesion to the fiber surface for retention, and may be less susceptible to removal during laundering or abrasion. However, antimicrobial activity requires the active material either be accessible at the fiber surface, or capable of releasing active substances, such as metal ions, that can reach microorganisms. Thus, the effectiveness of this approach depends on both the distribution of the additives within the polymer and their accessibility during use.

== Performance and durability ==
Antimicrobial performance refers to the ability of a treated textile to inhibit microbial growth or inactivate microorganisms under defined testing conditions. Durability refers to the extent to which this antimicrobial activity is retained following laundering, wear, or repeated environmental exposure.

=== Antimicrobial testing ===
Antimicrobial activity in textiles is evaluated using methods that measure microbial growth inhibition or changes in the number of viable microorganisms recovered from treated samples. Qualitative methods, such as agar diffusion tests, assess microbial growth surrounding a textile specimen placed on a culture medium. Quantitative methods measure changes in viable microbial counts following a defined contact period. Results depend on the microbial species and strain, contact time, humidity, and procedures used to recover and enumerate viable organisms. Importantly, demonstrated antibacterial activity does not establish equivalent antifungal or antiviral performance.

=== Active-agent availability ===
The antimicrobial effectiveness of a textile depends not only on the total amount of antimicrobial agent present, but also on its accessibility to microorganisms. For contact-active finishes, antimicrobial functional groups must remain exposed at the textile surface to interact directly with microbial cells. In release-based finishes, active substances must be able to diffuse from the coating or fiber into the surrounding medium to reach microorganisms. Consequently, antimicrobial agents embedded within fibers or covered by impermeable coatings may contribute little to antimicrobial activity, even when total agent loading is high.

== Safety and environmental considerations ==
Antimicrobial agents may be transferred from treated textiles to the skin or perspiration during wear, or released into wash water during laundering. For example, silver-treated textiles can release dissolved silver ions (Ag⁺) and silver-containing particles into laundering wastewater.

Once released, antimicrobial substances may undergo chemical and physical transformations that influence their mobility and biological activity. Dissolved metal ions can form complexes with other substances in wastewater, while nanoparticles may dissolve or aggregate into larger particles. Depending on their chemical form and concentration, these substances may affect microorganisms involved in wastewater treatment or aquatic organisms.

Antimicrobial resistance (AMR) is another potential concern. Exposure to certain antimicrobial agents used in textiles, including silver and quaternary ammonium compounds, can select for bacteria with reduced susceptibility to these substances. Some mechanisms associated with resistance to these agents may also be linked to antibiotic resistance. However, the extent to which antimicrobial textiles contribute to the emergence or spread of antibiotic resistance remains uncertain.

== See also ==
- Antimicrobial surface
- Antimicrobial resistance
- Industrial applications of nanotechnology
