= Ammonium myristate =

Names
- IUPAC name azanium;tetradecanoate
- Other names Ammonium tetradecanoate, tetradecanoic acid,ammonium salt (1:1)

Identifiers
CAS Number	16530-71-5
3D model (JSmol)	Interactive image
ChemSpider	146576
ECHA InfoCard	100.036.893
EC Number	240-599-8
PubChem CID	167548
UNII	6FX8H1ODBK
CompTox Dashboard (EPA)	DTXSID00167884
- InChI: InChI=1S/C14H28O2.H3N/c1-2-3-4-5-6-7-8-9-10-11-12-13-14(15)16;/h2-13H2,1H3,(H,15,16);1H3 Key: BJOYVZZDDFVLPI-UHFFFAOYSA-N
- SMILES: CCCCCCCCCCCCCC(=O)[O-].[NH4+]

Properties
Chemical formula	C_{14}H_{31}NO_{2}
Molar mass	245.407 g·mol^{−1}
Appearance	white paste
Melting point	144.8 °C
Boiling point	319.6 °C
Solubility in water	soluble
- Except where otherwise noted, data are given for materials in their standard state (at 25 °C [77 °F], 100 kPa). Infobox references

Ammonium myristate is a chemical compound with the chemical formula CH_{3}(CH_{2})_{12}COONH_{4}. This is an organic ammonium salt of myristic acid.

== Synthesis ==
=== Synthetic method ===
Ammonium myristate is synthesized through neutralization of myristic acid using ammonium hydroxide. The process involves dissolving myristic acid in an alcohol-based solvent, followed by gradual addition of concentrated ammonium hydroxide. The solution is then cooled and allowed to crystallize under controlled conditions to isolate the product.

=== Industrial method ===
In commercial production, ammonium myristate is manufactured via large-scale neutralization techniques. Myristic acid is first dissolved in a compatible solvent, and ammonium hydroxide is added incrementally. The resulting mixture undergoes crystallization and subsequent purification steps to achieve high-purity ammonium myristate.

== Physical properties ==
Ammonium myristate forms a white paste. It is soluble in water and ethanol.

X-ray diffraction studies of ammonium myristate show crystals that belong to space group P2_{1}/n.

== Uses ==
The compound is used to produce skin care products.

Also used as a cleaning agent, emulsifying agent, and dispersing agent.
