= DyP =

DyP may refer to:

- Dynamic programming
- Dye decolorizing peroxidase, an enzyme

== See also ==
- D. Y. Patil, Indian politician and educationist
