= Tetrahydrophthalic anhydride =

Names
- Preferred IUPAC name (3aR,7aS)-3a,4,7,7a-Tetrahydro-2-benzofuran-1,3-dione

Identifiers
CAS Number	935-79-5
3D model (JSmol)	Interactive image
ChEBI	CHEBI:180650
ChEMBL	ChEMBL2228342
ChemSpider	88950
ECHA InfoCard	100.012.098
EC Number	213-308-7
PubChem CID	98495
RTECS number	GW5775000
UNII	W9Q4666NOS
UN number	2698
CompTox Dashboard (EPA)	DTXSID80883570
- InChI: InChI=1S/C8H8O3/c9-7-5-3-1-2-4-6(5)8(10)11-7/h1-2,5-6H,3-4H2 Key: KMOUUZVZFBCRAM-UHFFFAOYSA-N
- SMILES: C1C=CCC2C1C(=O)OC2=O

Properties
Chemical formula	C_{8}H_{8}O_{3}
Molar mass	152.149 g·mol^{−1}
Appearance	white or colorless solid
Melting point	97–103 °C (207–217 °F; 370–376 K)

Hazards
- GHS labelling
Pictograms	(GHS05: Corrosive) (GHS07: Exclamation mark) (GHS08: Health hazard)
Signal word	Danger
Hazard statements	H317, H318, H334, H412
Precautionary statements	P261, P272, P273, P280, P285, P302+P352, P304+P341, P305+P351+P338, P310, P321, P333+P313, P342+P311, P363, P501
- Except where otherwise noted, data are given for materials in their standard state (at 25 °C [77 °F], 100 kPa). Infobox references

Tetrahydrophthalic anhydride is an organic compound with the formula C_{6}H_{8}C_{2}O_{3}. The compound exists as two isomers, this article being focused on the more common cis isomer. It is a white solid that is soluble in organic solvents.

== Preparation and derivatives ==
Tetrahydrophthalic anhydride, the cis isomer, is prepared by the Diels-Alder reaction of butadiene and maleic anhydride.

Tetrahydrophthalic anhydride is a precursor to other compounds including the dicarboxylic acid tetrahydrophthalic acid as well the tetrahydrophthalimide, which is a precursor to the fungicide Captan. It is also a precursor to 1,2,3,4-butanetetracarboxylic acid.
