= Sulfonate =

Salt, anion or ester of a sulfonic acid

The sulfonate ion.

In organosulfur chemistry, a sulfonate is a salt or anion of a sulfonic acid. The formula for this functional group is RSO^{−}_{3}. Sulfonates are the conjugate bases of sulfonic acids. Sulfonates are generally stable in water, non-oxidizing, and colorless. Many useful compounds and even some biochemicals are sulfonates. Most detergents and surfactants are sulfonates. These include alkylbenzene sulfonates, 𝛼-olefin sulfonates, and paraffin sulfonates.

== Preparation ==
Sulfonates are generally prepared by deprotonation (neutralization) of sulfonic acids. Because sulfonic acids are strong acids, they spontaneously convert to sulfonates when dissolved in water: RSO_{3}H → RSO^{−}_{3} + H^{+} To isolate sulfonate salts, these solutons are treated with base: RSO_{3}H + NaOH → RSO_{3}Na + H_{2}O

Classically, alkylsulfonates can prepared by the Strecker sulfite alkylation, in which sulfite displaces a halide:

RBr + Na_{2}SO_{3} → RSO_{3}Na + NaBr

Arylsulfonates are produced by sulfonation of the arene using sulfur trioxide, sulfuric acid, or related reagents, followed by deprotonation of the resulting acid:

ArH + H_{2}SO_{4} → ArSO_{3}H + H_{2}O
ArSO_{3}H + NaOH → ArSO_{3}Na + H_{2}O

Alkyl and arylsulfonates also arise by hydrolysis of sulfonyl chlorides:

RSO_{2}Cl + NaOH → ArSO_{3}Na + NaCl

== Structure ==
The structure of many sulfonate salts (and esters and acids) have been verified by X-ray crystallography. The sulfur site at the center of a tetrahedron, with three oxygen and a carbon at the vertices. For the salts, the S-O distances are near 144 picometers in length. Crystals typically contain water of crystallization, reflecting the highly ionic nature of these salts.

== Reactions ==
Being weakly basic, sulfonate salts are poor nucleophiles. Their alkylation requires strongly electrophilic alkylating agents. Sulfonates react with phosphorus pentachloride and related chlorinating agents to give the sulfonyl chloride:

RSO_{3}Na + PCl_{5} → RSO_{2}Cl + POCl_{3} + NaCl

=== Alkaline fusion ===
Arylsulfonates undergo hase hydrolysis to give (after acidic workup) phenols. This route (ArH to ArSO3H to ArOH) was once a major route to phenols. This reaction, called alkaline fusion, requires temperatures in the 200-300 °C range:

ArSO_{3}Na + NaOH → ArONa + Na_{2}SO_{3}

This route is employed commercially to produce ethylphenol from ethylbenzene.

== Uses and occurrences ==
Sulfonates
sodium alkylbenzene sulfonate

taurine

Coenzyme M

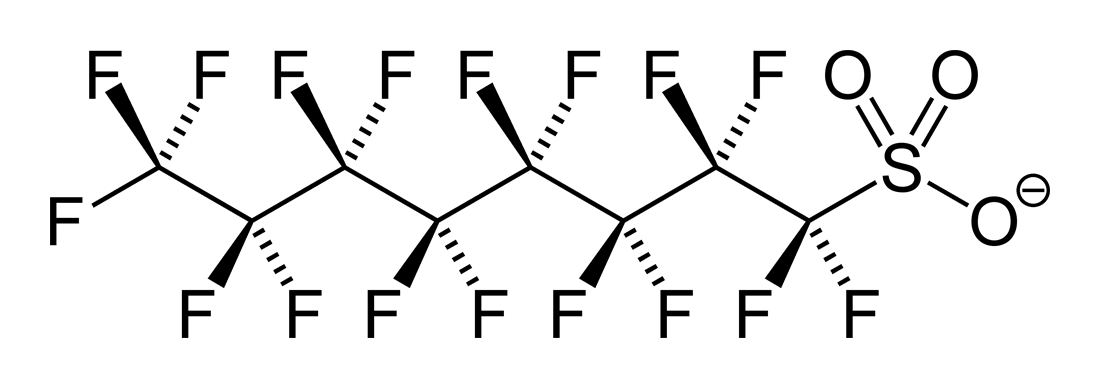
perfluorooctanesulfonate, an "everwhere chemical"

Allura Red AC, a red dye, was once used in foods

Acamprosate calcium for treating alcohol use disorder

Sulfonate salts are widely used surfactants and detergents. Alkylbenzenesulfonates are detergents found in shampoos, toothpaste, laundry detergent, dishwashing liquid, etc. They are also used as ion exchange resins.

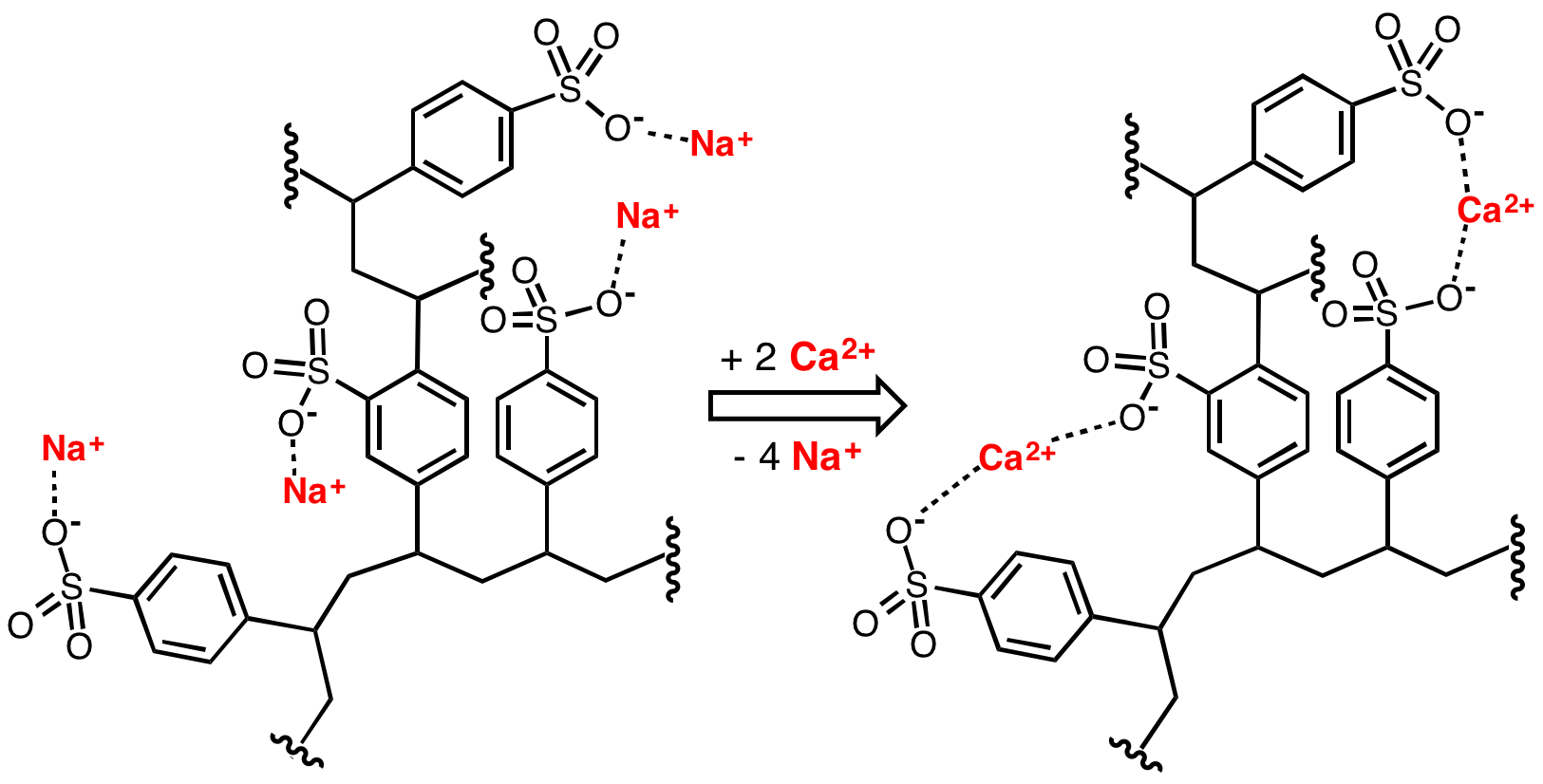
Water softening usually involves removal of calcium ions in water using a sulfonated ion-exchange resin.

Lignosulfonates (LS's) are derived from lignin, an abundant waste product from papermaking that is otherwise burned as fuel. LS's are water-soluble anionic polyelectrolytes that are mainly used as Dispersants but have many niche applications. In the sulfite process for paper-making, lignin is removed from the lignocellulose by treating wood chips with solutions of sulfite and bisulfite ions. These reagents cleave the bonds between the cellulose and lignin components as well as C-O bonds within the lignin itself.

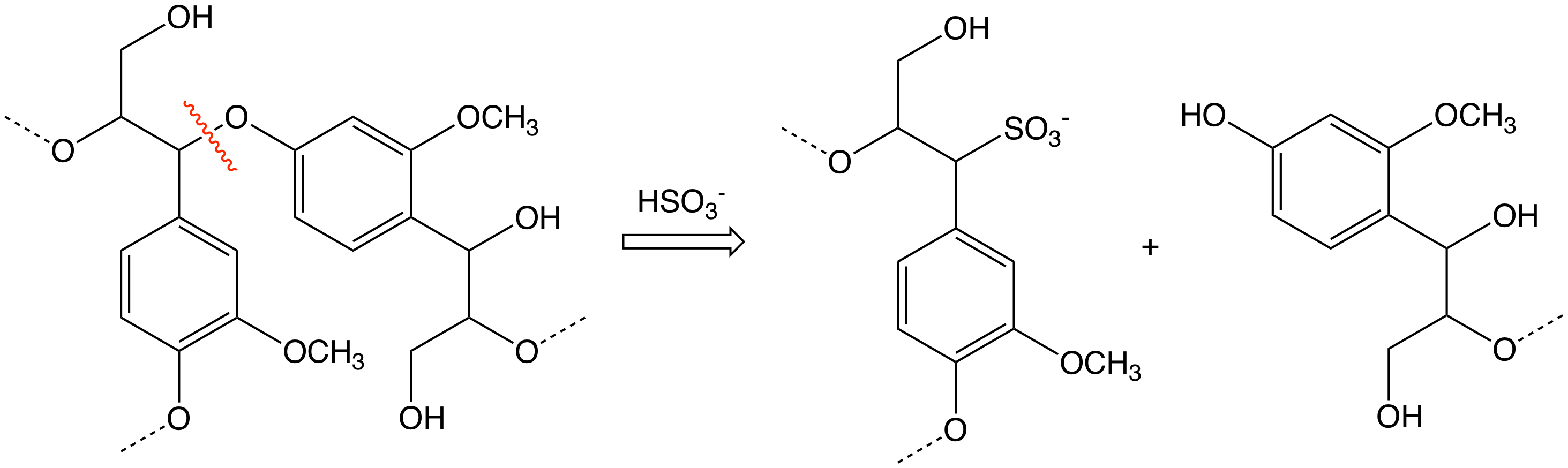
idealized scheme for lignin depolymerization by the Sulfite process.

Some alkylsulfonates occur naturally. Taurine (2-aminoethanesulfonate) is widely distributed in mammalian tissues, as well as a component of Red Bull energy drinks. Coenzyme-M (2-mercaptoethanesulfonic acid) is the methyl-carrying cofactor in methanogenesis.

== Examples ==
- Mesylate (methanesulfonate), CH_{3}−SO^{−}_{3}
- Triflate (trifluoromethanesulfonate), CF_{3}−SO^{−}_{3}
- Ethanesulfonate (esilate, esylate), CH_{3}CH_{2}−SO^{−}_{3}
- Tosylate (p-toluenesulfonate), p-CH_{3}−C_{6}H_{4}−SO^{−}_{3}
- Benzenesulfonate (besylate), C_{6}H_{5}−SO^{−}_{3}
- Closilate (closylate, chlorobenzenesulfonate), Cl−C_{6}H_{4}−SO^{−}_{3}
- Camphorsulfonate (camsilate, camsylate), (C_{10}H_{15}O)−SO^{−}_{3}
- Pipsylate (p-iodobenzenesulfonate derivative), p-I−C_{6}R_{4}−SO^{−}_{3}, where R is any group.
- Nosylate (o- or p-nitrobenzenesulfonate), o- or p-O_{2}N−C_{6}H_{4}−SO^{−}_{3}

== See also ==
- Sulfate
- Sulfoxide
- Sulfonyl
