= Superplasticizer =

High strength concrete additive

Superplasticizers (SPs), also known as high-range water reducers (HRWRs), are additives used for making high-strength concrete or to place self-compacting concrete. Plasticizers are chemical compounds enabling the production of concrete with approximately 15% less water content. Superplasticizers allow reduction in water content by 30% or more. These additives are employed at the level of a few weight percent. Plasticizers and superplasticizers also retard the setting and hardening of concrete.

According to their dispersing functionality and action mode, one distinguishes two classes of superplasticizers:

1. Ionic interactions (electrostatic repulsion): lignosulfonates (first generation of ancient water reducers), sulfonated synthetic polymers (naphthalene, or melamine, formaldehyde condensates) (second generation), and;
2. Steric effects: Polycarboxylates-ether (PCE) synthetic polymers bearing lateral chains (third generation).

Superplasticizers are used when well-dispersed cement particle suspensions are required to improve the flow characteristics (rheology) of concrete. Their addition allows to decrease the water-to-cement ratio of concrete or mortar without negatively affecting the workability of the mixture. It enables the production of self-consolidating concrete and high-performance concrete. The water–cement ratio is the main factor determining the concrete strength and its durability. Superplasticizers greatly improve the fluidity and the rheology of fresh concrete. The concrete strength increases when the water-to-cement ratio decreases because avoiding to add water in excess only for maintaining a better workability of fresh concrete results in a lower porosity of the hardened concrete, and so to a better resistance to compression.

The addition of SP in the truck during transit is a fairly modern development within the industry. Admixtures added in transit through automated slump management system, allow to maintain fresh concrete slump until discharge without reducing concrete quality.

== Working mechanism ==
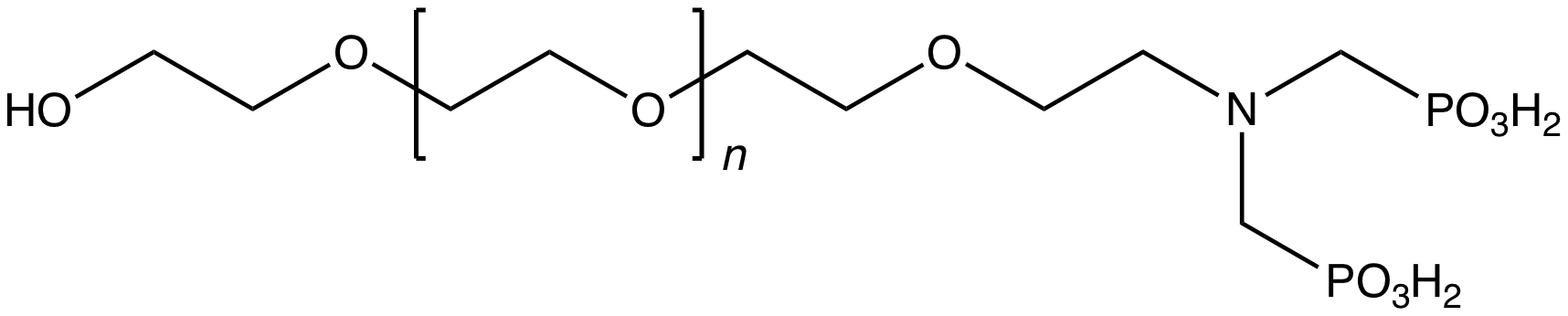
Phosphonic acid-terminated polyethers are effective superplasticizers.

Traditional plasticizers are lignosulfonates as their sodium salts. Superplasticizers are synthetic polymers. Compounds used as superplasticizers include (1) sulfonated naphthalene formaldehyde condensate, sulfonated melamine formaldehyde condensate, acetone formaldehyde condensate and (2) polycarboxylates ethers. Cross-linked melamine- or naphthalene-sulfonates, referred to as PMS (polymelamine sulfonate) and PNS (polynaphthalene sulfonate), respectively, are illustrative. They are prepared by cross-linking of the sulfonated monomers using formaldehyde or by sulfonating the corresponding crosslinked polymer.

Polycarboxylate superplasticizer stabilizing a colloidal suspension through steric interactions thanks to its lateral chains. Note: the PCE molecules are adsorbed onto positively-charged cement particles (tricalcium aluminate (C_{3}A) mineral phase).

The polymers used as plasticizers exhibit surfactant properties. They are often ionomers bearing negatively charged groups (sulfonates, carboxylates, or phosphonates...). They function as dispersants to minimize particles segregation in fresh concrete (separation of the cement slurry and water from the coarse and fine aggregates such as gravels and sand respectively). The negatively charged polymer backbone adsorbs onto the positively charged colloidal particles of unreacted cement, especially onto the tricalcium aluminate (C_{3}A) mineral phase of cement.

Melaminesulfonate (PMS) and naphthalenesulfonate (PNS) mainly act by electrostatic interactions with cement particles favoring their electrostatic repulsion while polycarboxylate-ether (PCE) superplasticizers sorb and coat large agglomerates of cement particles, and thanks to their lateral chains, sterically favor the dispersion of large cement agglomerates into smaller ones.

However, as their working mechanisms are not fully understood, cement-superplasticizer incompatibilities can be observed in certain cases.

== Common superplasticizer types ==
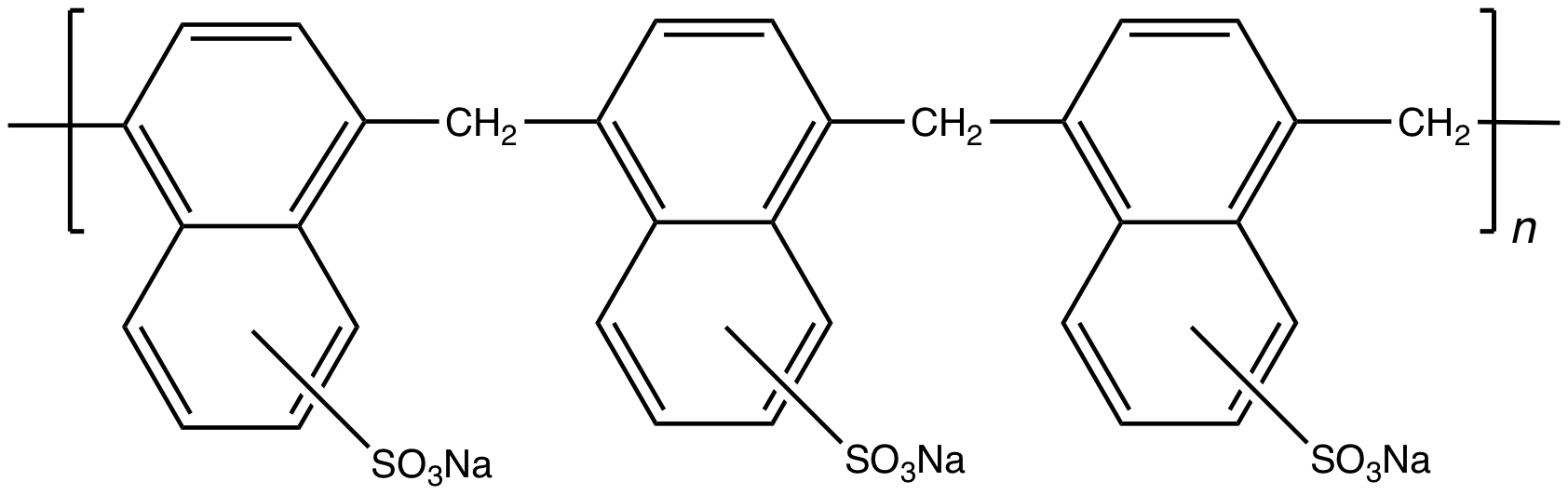
Idealized structure of naphthalenesulfonate/formaldehyde polymer used as a superplasticizer

- Sulfonated naphthalene formaldehyde (SNF), also known as naphthalene sulfonate formaldehyde condensate, is a synthetic high-range water-reducing admixture. It belongs to the group of sulfonated polycondensation products and disperses cement particles mainly through electrostatic repulsion. Under ASTM C494/C494M, high-range water-reducing admixtures are defined as admixtures capable of reducing the mixing water required to produce concrete of a given consistency by 12% or greater. ACI 212.3R also lists naphthalene sulfonate polycondensation products among common high-range water-reducing admixtures, with reported water reduction generally in the 12–40% range for this class of admixtures.
- Sulfonated melamine formaldehyde (SMF), also known as melamine sulfonate formaldehyde condensate, is another sulfonated synthetic high-range water-reducing admixture. Like SNF, it disperses cement particles mainly through electrostatic repulsion by increasing the negative charge on cement particle surfaces. ACI 212.3R lists melamine sulfonate polycondensation products as one of the common chemical families used for high-range water-reducing admixtures. SMF has been widely used where high early strength, good surface finish, and controlled air entrainment are required, including precast concrete, architectural concrete, and repair mortars.
- Lignosulfonates are first-generation water-reducing admixtures derived mainly from lignin-containing by-products of the sulfite pulping process. They function primarily by dispersing cement particles through electrostatic effects and are generally used as normal water-reducing admixtures rather than high-range water reducers. Portland Cement Association guidance describes typical water reducers as reducing concrete water content by approximately 5–10%, while mid-range water reducers usually provide about 6–12% water reduction. Because lignosulfonates provide lower water reduction than synthetic superplasticizers, they are mainly used in conventional concrete where moderate water reduction, workability improvement, and cost efficiency are required.
- Polycarboxylate superplasticizer (PCE), also called water reducer, is an additive used in concrete and mortars. It improves the flowability without increasing the water content. This allows for high-strength, high-performance concrete and mortar with lower water-to-cement ratios. SCE accelerate the early strengthening of concrete or mortar.

== Applications ==
Superplasticizers are widely used in the production of self-compacting concrete (SCC), high-performance concrete (HPC), ultra-high-performance concrete (UHPC), and precast concrete, where low water-to-cement ratios and high workability are required. Their ability to disperse cement particles improves the rheological properties of fresh concrete while allowing a reduction in mixing water content.

In precast concrete manufacturing, superplasticizers facilitate mold filling, improve surface finish, and contribute to early strength development. In UHPC applications, they promote the dispersion of ultrafine powders such as silica fume, enabling the production of highly flowable mixtures under extremely low water-to-binder ratio conditions. Superplasticizers are also employed in ready-mix concrete to maintain workability during transportation and placement.

Superplasticizers are increasingly used in 3D concrete printing, where precise control of rheological properties is essential. They help improve flowability under low water-to-binder ratio conditions while supporting the extrusion and buildability requirements of printable cementitious materials.

== See also ==
- Particle aggregation (inverse process of)
- Peptization
- Plasticizer
- Polycarboxylates
- Rheology
- Surfactant
- Suspension (chemistry)
