= Lignosulfonates =

Byproducts from the production of wood pulp

Lignosulfonates (LS) are water-soluble anionic polyelectrolyte polymers: they are byproducts from the production of wood pulp using sulfite pulping. LS's are used for emulsion stabilization and Dispersants,a binder to suppresses dust on unpaved roads, and in water treatment.

Lignosulfonates have very broad ranges of molecular mass (they are very polydisperse). A range of from 1,000 to 140,000 Da has been reported for softwood lignosulfonates with lower values reported for hardwoods. Sulfonated Kraft lignin tends to have smaller molecules at 2,000–3,000 Da. SL and LS are non-toxic, non-corrosive, and biodegradable. A range of further modifications may be applied to LS and SL, including oxidation, hydroxymethylation, sulfomethylation, and a combination thereof.

== Preparation ==
Most delignification in sulfite pulping involves acidic cleavage of ether bonds, which connect many of the constituents of lignin. Sulfonated lignin (SL) refers to other forms of lignin by-product, such as those derived from the much more popular Kraft process, that have been processed to add sulfonic acid groups. The two have similar uses and are commonly confused with each other, with SL being much cheaper. LS and SL both appear as free-flowing powders; the former is light brown while the latter is dark brown.

=== Lignosulfonates ===
Lignosulfonates are recovered from the spent pulping liquids (red or brown liquor) from sulfite pulping. Ultrafiltration can also be used to separate lignosulfonates from the spent pulping liquid. A list of CAS numbers for the various metal salts of lignosulfonate is available.

The electrophilic carbocations produced during ether cleavage react with bisulfite ions (HSO_{3}^{−}) to give sulfonates.

R-O-R' + H^{+} → R^{+} + R'OH
R^{+} + HSO_{3}^{−} → R-SO_{3}H

The primary site for ether cleavage is the α-carbon (carbon atom attached to the aromatic ring) of the propyl (linear three carbon) side chain. The following structures do not specify the structure since lignin and its derivatives are complex mixtures: the purpose is to give a general idea of the structure of lignosulfonates. The groups R^{1} and R^{2} can be a wide variety of groups found in the structure of lignin. Sulfonation occurs on the side chains, not on the aromatic ring like in p-toluenesulfonic acid.

Generalized structure of lignosulfonates

=== Sulfonated Kraft lignin ===
Kraft lignin from black liquor, which is produced in much higher amounts, may be processed into sulfonated lignin. The lignin is first precipitated by acidifying the liquor with CO_{2} then washed (other methods for isolation exist). Reaction with sodium sulfite or sodium bisulfite and an aldehyde under a basic environment completes sulfonation. Here the sulfonic acid groups end up on the aromatic ring instead of the aliphatic sidechain.

== Uses ==
Chemically, LS's may be used as a tannin for tanning leather and as a feedstock for a variety of products.

=== Dispersant ===
The single largest use for lignosulfonates is as plasticizers in making concrete, where they allow concrete to be made with less water (giving stronger concrete) while maintaining the ability of the concrete to flow. Lignosulfonates are also used during the production of cement, where they act as grinding aids in the cement mill and as a rawmix slurry deflocculant (that reduces the viscosity of the slurry).

Lignosulfonates are also used for the production of plasterboard to reduce the amount of water required to make the stucco flow and form the layer between two sheets of paper. The reduction in water content allows lower kiln temperatures to dry the plasterboard, saving energy.

The ability of lignosulfonates to reduce the viscosity of mineral slurries (deflocculation) is used to advantage in oil drilling mud, where it replaced tannic acids from quebracho (a tropical tree). Furthermore, lignosulphates are being researched for use in enhanced oil recovery (EOR) due to their ability to reduce interfacial tension in foams, allowing for improved sweep efficiency, and hence increased recovery factor.

=== Binder ===
Besides their use as dispersants lignosulfonates are also good binders. They are used as binders in well-paper, particle boards, linoleum flooring, coal briquettes, and roads.

They also form a constituent of the paste used to coat the lead-antimony-calcium or lead-antimony-selenium grids in a Lead-acid battery.

Aqueous lignosulfonate solutions are also widely used as a non-toxic dust suppression agent for unpaved road surfaces, where it is popularly, if erroneously, called "tree sap". Roads treated with lignosulfonates can be distinguished from those treated with calcium chloride by color: lignosulfonates give the road surface a dark grey color, while calcium chloride lend the road surface a distinctive tan or brown color. As lignosulfonates do not rely on water to provide their binding properties, they tend to be more useful in arid locations.

It is used as a soil stabilizer.

=== Chemical feedstock ===
Oxidation of lignosulfonates from softwood trees produced vanillin (artificial vanilla flavor).

Dimethyl sulfide and dimethyl sulfoxide (an important organic solvent) are produced from lignosulfonates. The first step involves heating lignosulfonates with sulfides or elemental sulfur to produce dimethyl sulfide. The methyl groups come from methyl ethers present in the lignin. Oxidation of dimethyl sulfide with nitrogen dioxide produces dimethyl sulfoxide (DMSO).

=== Other uses ===
The anti-oxidant effect of lignosulfonates is utilized in feeds, ensilage and flame retardants.

The UV absorbance of lignosulfonates is utilized in sun screens and bio-pesticides.

Lignosulfonate is used in agriculture as an analogue of humic substances. As a soil conditioner, it is mainly used to enhance the absorption and retention of fertilizers and other nutrients. It is able to chelate minerals while remaining bio-degradable, an improvement compared to EDTA. Further hydrolysis and oxidation produces a product even more similar to humus, marketed as "lignohumate".

== See also ==
- Sodium lignosulfonate
