= 1,2,3,4-Butanetetracarboxylic acid =

Names
- Preferred IUPAC name Butane-1,2,3,4-tetracarboxylic acid

Identifiers
CAS Number	1703-58-8 unspecified stereochemistry; 4534-68-3 meso; 4799-96-6 (R,R)-enantiomer
3D model (JSmol)	Interactive image
ChEMBL	ChEMBL1574612
ChemSpider	14804
EC Number	216-938-0
PubChem CID	15560
UNII	5A3KY454MZ
- InChI: InChI=1S/C8H10O8/c9-5(10)1-3(7(13)14)4(8(15)16)2-6(11)12/h3-4H,1-2H2,(H,9,10)(H,11,12)(H,13,14)(H,15,16) Key: GGAUUQHSCNMCAU-UHFFFAOYSA-N
- SMILES: C(C(C(CC(=O)O)C(=O)O)C(=O)O)C(=O)O

Properties
Chemical formula	C_{8}H_{10}O_{8}
Molar mass	234.160 g·mol^{−1}
Appearance	White solid
Melting point	236 °C (457 °F; 509 K); 246 °C for meso 227-230 °C for (R,R)
- Except where otherwise noted, data are given for materials in their standard state (at 25 °C [77 °F], 100 kPa). Infobox references

1,2,3,4-Butanetetracarboxylic acid is an organic compound with the formula (CH(CO_{2}H)CH_{2}CO_{2}H)_{2}. It is one of the simplest stable tetracarboxylic acids. The compound exists as two diastereomers, meso and the (R,R)/(S,S) pair. All are white solids. The compound is produced by oxidation of tetrahydrophthalic anhydride.

== Uses and reactions ==
Among the several possible uses, it has been repeatedly investigated in the textile industry, e.g., for permanent press clothing. As expected for a polycarboxylate, it binds zinc to afford coordination polymers.

It forms a dianhydride (RN 4534-73-0), which consists of two succinic anhydride-like rings.
