= Dye decolorizing peroxidase =

Dye-decolorizing peroxidase

Identifiers
- EC no.: 1.11.1.19

Databases
- IntEnz: IntEnz view
- BRENDA: BRENDA entry
- ExPASy: NiceZyme view
- KEGG: KEGG entry
- MetaCyc: metabolic pathway
- PRIAM: profile
- PDB structures: RCSB PDB PDBe PDBsum
Search
- PMC: articles
- PubMed: articles
- NCBI: proteins

Dye-decolorizing peroxidase (EC 1.11.1.19, DyP, DyP-type peroxidase) is an enzyme with systematic name Reactive-Blue-5:hydrogen-peroxide oxidoreductase. This enzyme catalyses the following chemical reaction

Reactive Blue 5 + H_{2}O_{2} $\rightleftharpoons$ phthalate + 2,2'-disulfonyl azobenzene + 3-[(4-amino-6-chloro-1,3,5-triazin-2-yl)amino]benzenesulfonate

These heme proteins are secreted by basidiomycetous fungi and eubacteria.
