= Polycarboxylates =

Any polymer with repeating carboxylate side chains

Structure of 1,2,3,4-butanetetracarboxylate, a low molecular weight polycarboxylate.

Polycarboxylates are organic compounds with several carboxylic acid groups. Butane-1,2,3,4-tetracarboxylate is one example. Often, polycarboxylate refers to linear polymers with a high molecular mass (M_{r} ≤ 100 000) and with many carboxylate groups. They are polymers of acrylic acid or copolymers of acrylic acid and maleic acid. The polymer is used as the sodium salt (see: sodium polyacrylate).

== Use ==
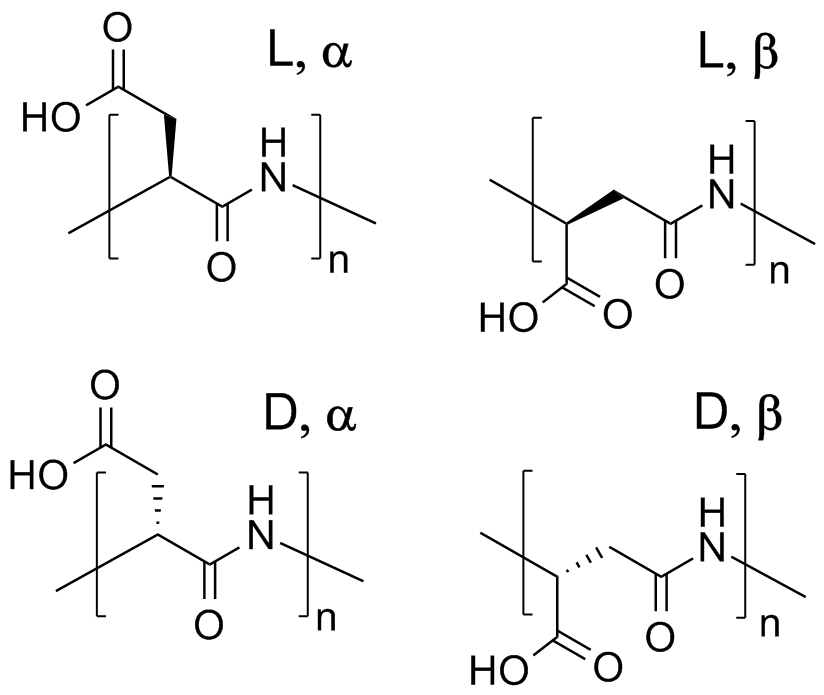
Isomers of the repeating unit in polyaspartic acid.

Polycarboxylates are used as builders in detergents. Their high chelating power, even at low concentrations, lowers deposits on the laundry and inhibits the growth of calcite crystals.

As applied to concrete, PCE-based superplasticizers can reduce water content by up to 40% at low dosages of around 0.12% to 0.22% without compromising fluidity. Polycarboxylate superplasticizers accelerate the early strength development of concrete and mortar. They also help with slump retention, ensuring concrete consistency and workability. With a higher slump rating, concrete can be more fluid and pumpable, especially for projects involving long-distance pumping and bulk construction.

== Environmental considerations ==
Polycarboxylates are poorly biodegradable but have a low ecotoxicity. In the sewage treatment plant, the polymer remains largely in the sludge and is separated from the wastewater.

Polyamino acids like polyaspartic acid and polyglutamic acid have better biodegradability but lower chelating performance than polyacrylates. They are also less stable towards heat and alkali. Since they contain nitrogen, they can contribute to eutrophication.

== See also ==
- tricarboxylic acids
