= Sodium lignosulfonate =

Identifiers
CAS Number	sample: 8061-51-6
3D model (JSmol)	sample: Interactive image
ChemSpider	sample: 78432514
ECHA InfoCard	100.111.815
EC Number	sample: 617-124-1
PubChem CID	sample: 25113562
UNII	sample: XY2KOA860T
CompTox Dashboard (EPA)	sample: DTXSID5025499
- InChI: InChI=1S/C20H26O10S2.2Na/c1-28-18-7-3-6-15(20(18)21)12-16(13-32(25,26)27)30-17-9-8-14(11-19(17)29-2)5-4-10-31(22,23)24;;/h3,6-9,11,16,21H,4-5,10,12-13H2,1-2H3,(H,22,23,24)(H,25,26,27);;/q;2*+1/p-2/t16-;;/m1../s1 Key: YDEXUEFDPVHGHE-GGMCWBHBSA-L
- SMILES: sample: COC1=CC=CC(=C1O)C[C@H](CS(=O)(=O)[O-])OC2=C(C=C(C=C2)CCCS(=O)(=O)[O-])OC.[Na+].[Na+]

Properties
Chemical formula	Variable
Appearance	Brown powder
Density	~ 0.5 g/cm^{3}
Melting point	Decomposes

Hazards
- GHS labelling
Pictograms	(GHS07: Exclamation mark)
Signal word	Warning
Hazard statements	H319
Precautionary statements	P264, P280, P305+P351+P338, P337+P313
- Except where otherwise noted, data are given for materials in their standard state (at 25 °C [77 °F], 100 kPa). Infobox references

Sodium lignosulfonate (lignosulfonic acid, sodium salt) is used in the food industry as a de-foaming agent for paper production and in adhesives for items that come in contact with food. It has preservative properties, and is used as an ingredient in animal feeds. It is also used for construction, ceramics, mineral powder, chemical industry, textile industry (leather), metallurgical industry, petroleum industry, fire-retardant materials, rubber vulcanization, organic polymerization.

It is a pepsin inhibitor. Vovac, J.A. et al., Arch. Int. Pharmacodyn. Ther., 1969, 177, 150 (pharmacol) Alphin, R.S. et al., Experientia, 1972,28, 53 (pharmacol)

== Names ==
Sodium lignosulfonate is also known by the following names.

- AHR 2438B
- ARBO AO2
- ARBO SO1
- ARBO TDS
- Betz 402
- Borresperse NA
- Borrsperse N
- D 419-6
- Diwatex 30FKP
- Flowpro 1512
- HR 5
- HR 5 (cement additive)
- Kelig 100
- Kelig 400
- Lignopol
- Lignosite 431
- Lignosite 458
- Lignosite 854
- Lignosol
- Lignosol AXD
- Lignosol D 10
- Lignosol DXD
- Lignosol FTA
- Lignosol NSX 110
- Lignosol SFX 65
- Lignosol X
- Lignosol X 50
- Lignosol XD
- Lsu
- Lsu (lignosulfate)
- Maracell C
- Maracell E
- Maracell XC 2
- Maracell XE
- Marasperse B
- Marasperse CBA 1
- Marasperse CBO
- Marasperse CBOS 4
- Marasperse CBS
- Marasperse CBX 2
- Marasperse N
- Marasperse N 22
- Neocobaltin PNA 11
- Newkalgen RX-B
- Norlig 12
- NorthQuest 5573
- Orzan CD
- Orzan LS
- Orzan S
- Orzan SL 50
- Pearllex CP
- Pearllex N
- Peritan NA
- Polyfon
- Polyfon F
- Polyfon H
- Polyfon HUN
- Polyfon O
- Polyfon T
- Pozzolith 100XR
- Pozzolith 70
- Raycote
- Raylig 260LR
- Raymix
- Reax 05A
- Reax 45A
- Reax 80C
- Reax 81A
- Reax 82
- Reax 825E
- Reax 83A
- Reax 83C
- Reax 85A
- Reax 85C
- Reax 88B
- Reax 905
- Reax 95A
- Reax 98B
- Reax SR 1
- Reveal NM
- Reveal SM
- Reveal SM 5
- Reveal WM
- STARLIG AM95G
- STARLIG AML
- STARLIG CA592G
- STARLIG CA6G
- STARLIG CWA
- STARLIG K18
- STARLIG N10
- STARLIG N12
- STARLIG N9
- STARLIG NA2G
- STARLIG NA98S
- STARLIG Na8GB
- San-X P 213
- San-X P 252
- San-X P 550
- San-X P 552
- Sanekis P 550
- Sanflo GR
- Sodalig
- Sodium ligninsulfonate
- Sodium lignosulfite
- Sodium lignosulfonate
- Sodium lignosulfonic acid
- Sodium lignosulfonic acids
- Sulfonated lignin sodium salt
- Temsperse P 2000
- Temsperse S 001
- UF 10000A
- Ufoxane 3
- Ufoxane 3A
- UfoxaneE 2
- Ultramix
- Ultrazine NA
- Ultrazine NAS
- Urzan S
- Vanicell
- Vanillex HW
- Vanillex N
- Vanisperse A
- Wanin S
- Wanin SR
- Zewa EF 220
- Zewa S 210
- Zewa SL
