= Dispersant =

Substance added to suspensions to increase separation of particles

A dispersant or a dispersing agent is a substance, typically a surfactant, that is added to a suspension of solid or liquid particles in a liquid (such as a colloid or emulsion) to improve the separation of the particles and to prevent their settling or clumping.

Dispersants are widely used to stabilize various industrial and artisanal products, such as paints, ferrofluids, and salad dressings. The plasticizers or superplasticizers, used to improve the workability of pastes like concrete and clay, are typically dispersants. The concept also largely overlaps with that of detergent, used to bring oily contamination into water suspension, and of emulsifier, used to create homogeneous mixtures of immiscible liquids like water and oil. Natural suspensions like milk and latex contain substances that act as dispersants.

== Applications ==
=== Automotive ===
Automotive engine oils contain both detergents and dispersants. Metallic-based detergents prevent the accumulation of varnish like deposits on the cylinder walls. They also neutralize acids. Dispersants maintain contaminants in suspension.

Dispersants added to gasoline prevent the buildup of gummy residues.

=== Bio-dispersing ===
Dispersants are used to prevent formation of biofouling or biofilms in industrial processes. It is also possible to disperse bacterial slime and increase the efficiency of biocides.

=== Concrete and stucco ===
Dispersants are used as plasticizers or superplasticizers in concrete formulations to lower the use of water while retaining the needed slump (flow) property. A lower water content makes the concrete stronger and more impervious to water penetration.

Similarly, dispersants are used as plasticizers in the gypsum slurry during wallboard manufacture, to reduce the amount of water used. The lower water usage allows lower energy use to dry the wallboard.

=== Detergents ===
Dispersing is the principal goal in the use of detergents, which the liquid bath is water (detergents also are used as emulsifiers in some applications). Laundry detergents encase dirt and grime in miscelles, which naturally disperse.

=== Oil drilling ===
Dispersants in oil drilling aid in breaking up solids or liquids as fine particles or droplets into another medium. This term is often applied incorrectly to clay deflocculants. Clay dispersants prevent formation of "fish-eye" globules. For dispersing (emulsification) of oil into water (or water into oils), surfactants selected on the basis of hydrophilic-lipophilic balance (HLB) number can be used. For foam drilling fluids, synthetic detergents and soaps are used, along with polymers, to disperse foam bubbles into the air or gas.

=== Oil spill ===
Dispersants can be used to dissipate oil slicks. They may rapidly disperse large amounts of certain oil types from the sea surface by transferring it into the water column. They will cause the oil slick to break up and form water-soluble micelles that are rapidly diluted. Then effectively spread throughout a larger volume of water than the surface from where the oil was dispersed. They can also delay the formation of persistent oil-in-water emulsions. However, laboratory experiments showed that dispersants increased toxic hydrocarbon levels in fish by a factor of up to 100 and may kill fish eggs.

Dispersant Corexit 9527 was for example used to disperse an oil slick in the Gulf of Mexico in 1979 (Ixtoc) over one thousand square miles of sea. The same dispersant was also used in an attempt to clean up the Exxon Valdez oil spill in 1989, though its use was discontinued as there was not enough wave action to mix the dispersant with the oil in the water. During the Deepwater Horizon oil spill in 2010, unprecedented amounts of the dispersants Corexit 9500 and 9527 were used (approximately 7 million liters).

=== Process industry ===
In the process industry dispersing agents are added to process liquids to prevent unwanted deposits by keeping them finely dispersed. They function in both aqueous and nonaqueous media.

=== Surface coating ===
In order to provide optimal performance, pigment particles must act independently of each other in the coating film and thus must remain well dispersed throughout manufacture, storage, application, and film formation. Unfortunately, colloidal dispersions such as the pigment dispersions in liquid coatings are inherently unstable, and they must be stabilized against the flocculation that might occur.

== See also ==
- Plasticizer
- Deflocculant
- Detergent
- Surfactant
- Superplasticizer
- Suspension (chemistry)
- Solubilization
