= Corrosion engineering =

Field of engineering dealing with materials

Corrosion engineering is an engineering specialty that applies scientific, technical, engineering skills, and knowledge of natural laws and physical resources to design and implement materials, structures, devices, systems, and procedures to manage corrosion. From a holistic perspective, corrosion is the phenomenon of metals returning to the state they are found in nature. The driving force that causes metals to corrode is a consequence of their temporary existence in metallic form. To produce metals starting from naturally occurring minerals and ores, it is necessary to provide a certain amount of energy, e.g. Iron ore in a blast furnace. It is therefore thermodynamically inevitable that these metals when exposed to various environments would revert to their state found in nature. Corrosion and corrosion engineering thus involves a study of chemical kinetics, thermodynamics, electrochemistry and materials science.

== General background ==
Generally related to metallurgy or materials science, corrosion engineering also relates to non-metallics including ceramics, cement, composite material, and conductive materials such as carbon and graphite. Corrosion engineers often manage other not-strictly-corrosion processes including (but not restricted to) cracking, brittle fracture, crazing, fretting, erosion, and more typically categorized as Infrastructure asset management. In the 1990s, Imperial College London even offered a Master of Science degree entitled "The Corrosion of Engineering Materials". UMIST – University of Manchester Institute of Science and Technology and now part of the University of Manchester also offered a similar course. Corrosion Engineering master's degree courses are available worldwide and the curricula contain study material about the control and understanding of corrosion. Ohio State University has a corrosion center named after one of the more well known corrosion engineers Mars G Fontana.

== Corrosion costs ==
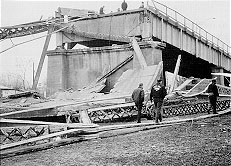
The Silver Bridge between West Virginia and Ohio collapsed in 1967 due to the stress corrosion cracking of a single eyebar.

In the year 1995, it was reported that the costs of corrosion nationwide in the United States were nearly $300 billion per year. This confirmed earlier reports of damage to the world economy caused by corrosion.

Zaki Ahmad, in his book Principles of corrosion engineering and corrosion control, states that "Corrosion engineering is the application of the principles evolved from corrosion science to minimize or prevent corrosion". Shreir et al. suggest likewise in their large, two volume work entitled Corrosion. Corrosion engineering involves designing of corrosion prevention schemes and implementation of specific codes and practices. Corrosion prevention measures, including Cathodic protection, designing to prevent corrosion and coating of structures fall within the regime of corrosion engineering. However, corrosion science and engineering go hand-in-hand and they cannot be separated: it is a permanent marriage to produce new and better methods of protection from time to time. This may include the use of Corrosion inhibitors. In the Handbook of corrosion engineering, the author Pierre R. Roberge states "Corrosion is the destructive attack of a material by reaction with its environment. The serious consequences of the corrosion process have become a problem of worldwide significance."

Costs are not only monetary. There is a financial cost and also a waste of natural resources. In 1988 it was estimated that one tonne of metal was converted completely to rust every ninety seconds in the United Kingdom. There is also the cost of human lives. Failure whether catastrophic or otherwise due to corrosion has cost human lives.

== Corrosion engineering and corrosion societies and associations ==
Corrosion engineering groups have formed around the world to educate, prevent, slow, and manage corrosion. These include the National Association of Corrosion Engineers (NACE), the European Federation of Corrosion (EFC), and the Australasian Corrosion Association. The corrosion engineer's main task is to economically and safely manage the effects of corrosion of materials.

== Notable contributors to the field ==
Some of the most notable contributors to the Corrosion Engineering discipline include among others:

- Michael Faraday (1791–1867)
- Marcel Pourbaix (1904–1998)
- Herbert H. Uhlig (1907–1993)
- Ulick Richardson Evans (1889–1980)
- Mars Guy Fontana (1910–1988)
- Melvin Romanoff ( -1970)

== Types of corrosion situations ==
Corrosion engineers and consultants tend to specialize in Internal or External corrosion scenarios. In both, they may provide corrosion control recommendations, failure analysis investigations, sell corrosion control products, or provide installation or design of corrosion control and monitoring systems. Every material has its weakness. Aluminum, galvanized/zinc coatings, brass, and copper do not survive well in very alkaline or very acidic pH environments. Copper and brasses do not survive well in high nitrate or ammonia environments. Carbon steels and iron do not survive well in low soil resistivity and high chloride environments. High chloride environments can even overcome and attack steel encased in normally protective concrete. Concrete does not survive well in high sulfate and acidic environments. And nothing survives well in high sulfide and low redox potential environments with corrosive bacteria. This is called Biogenic sulfide corrosion.

=== External corrosion ===
==== Underground soil side corrosion ====
Underground corrosion control engineers collect soil samples to test soil chemistry for corrosive factors such as pH, minimum soil resistivity, chlorides, sulfates, ammonia, nitrates, sulfide, and redox potential. They collect samples from the depth that infrastructure will occupy, because soil properties may change from strata to strata. The minimum test of in-situ soil resistivity is measured using the Wenner four pin method if often performed to judge a site's corrosivity. However, during a dry period, the test may not show actual corrosivity, since underground condensation can leave soil in contact with buried metal surfaces more moist. This is why measuring a soil's minimum or saturated resistivity is important. Soil resistivity testing alone does not identify corrosive elements. Corrosion engineers can investigate locations experiencing active corrosion using above ground survey methods and design corrosion control systems such as cathodic protection to stop or reduce the rate of corrosion.

Geotechnical engineers typically do not practice corrosion engineering, and refer clients to a corrosion engineer if soil resistivity is below 3,000 ohm-cm or less, depending the soil corrosivity categorization table they read. Unfortunately, an old dairy farm can have soil resistivities above 3,000 ohm-cm and still contain corrosive ammonia and nitrate levels that corrode copper piping or grounding rods. A general saying about corrosion is, "If the soil is great for farming, it is great for corrosion."

==== Underwater external corrosion ====
Underwater corrosion engineers apply the same principals used in underground corrosion control but use specially trained and certified scuba divers for condition assessment, and corrosion control system installation and commissioning. The main difference being in the type of reference cells used to collect voltage readings. Corrosion of piles and the legs of oil and gas rigs are of particular concern. This includes rigs in the North Sea off the coast of the United Kingdom and the Gulf of Mexico.

==== Atmospheric corrosion ====
Atmospheric corrosion generally refers to general corrosion in a non-specific environment. Prevention of atmospheric corrosion is typically handled by use of materials selection and coatings specifications. The use of zinc coatings also known as galvanization on steel structures is a form of cathodic protection where the zinc acts as a sacrificial anode and also a form of coating. Small scratches are expected to occur in the galvanized coating over time. The zinc being more active in the galvanic series corrodes in preference to the underlying steel and the corrosion products fil the scratch preventing further corrosion. As long as the scratches are fine, condensation moisture should not corrode the underlying steel as long as both the zinc and steel are in contact. As long as there is moisture, the zinc corrodes and eventually disappears. Impressed current cathodic protection is also used.

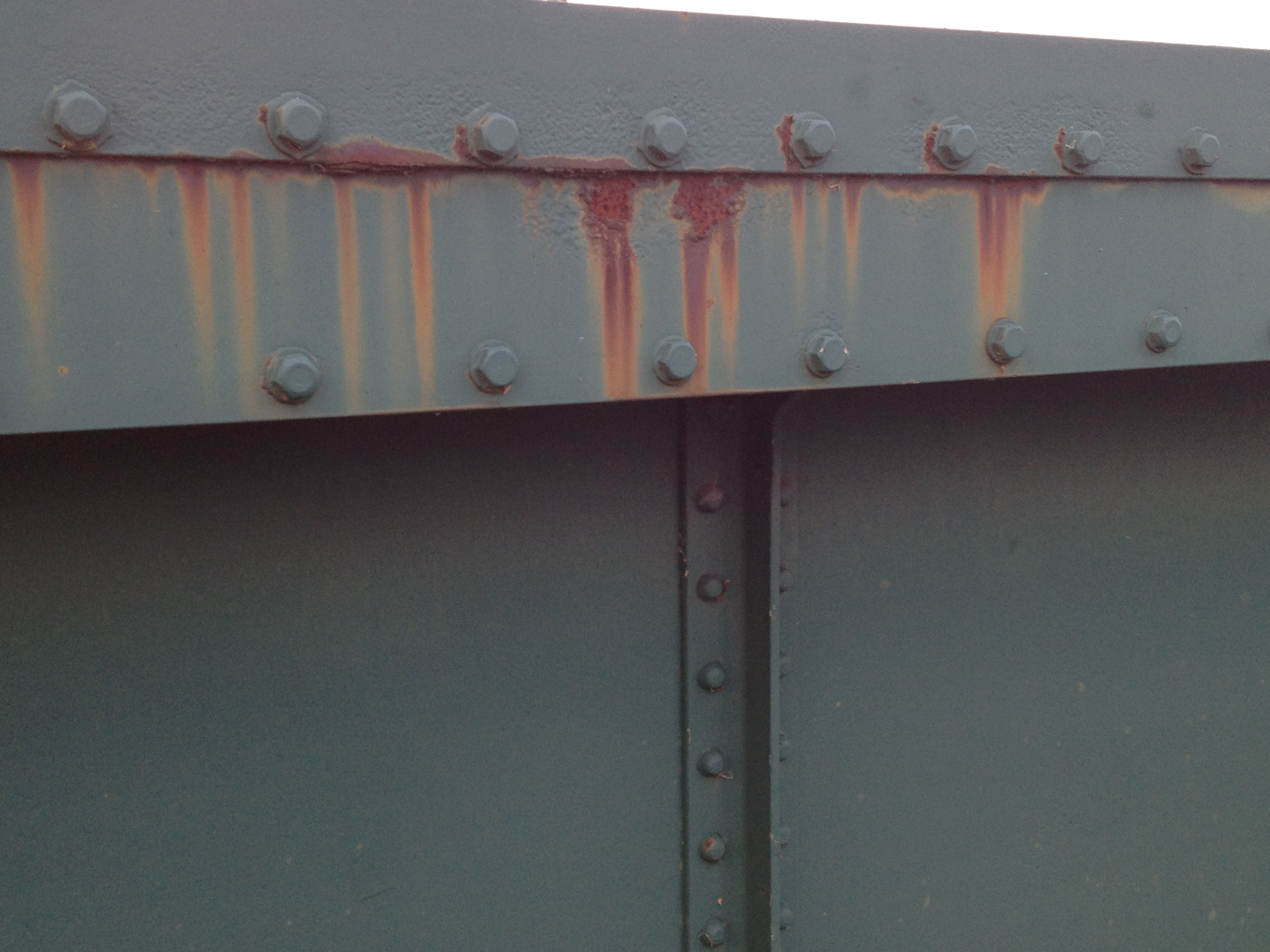
Side view Crow Hall Railway Bridge north of Preston Lancs corroding – general

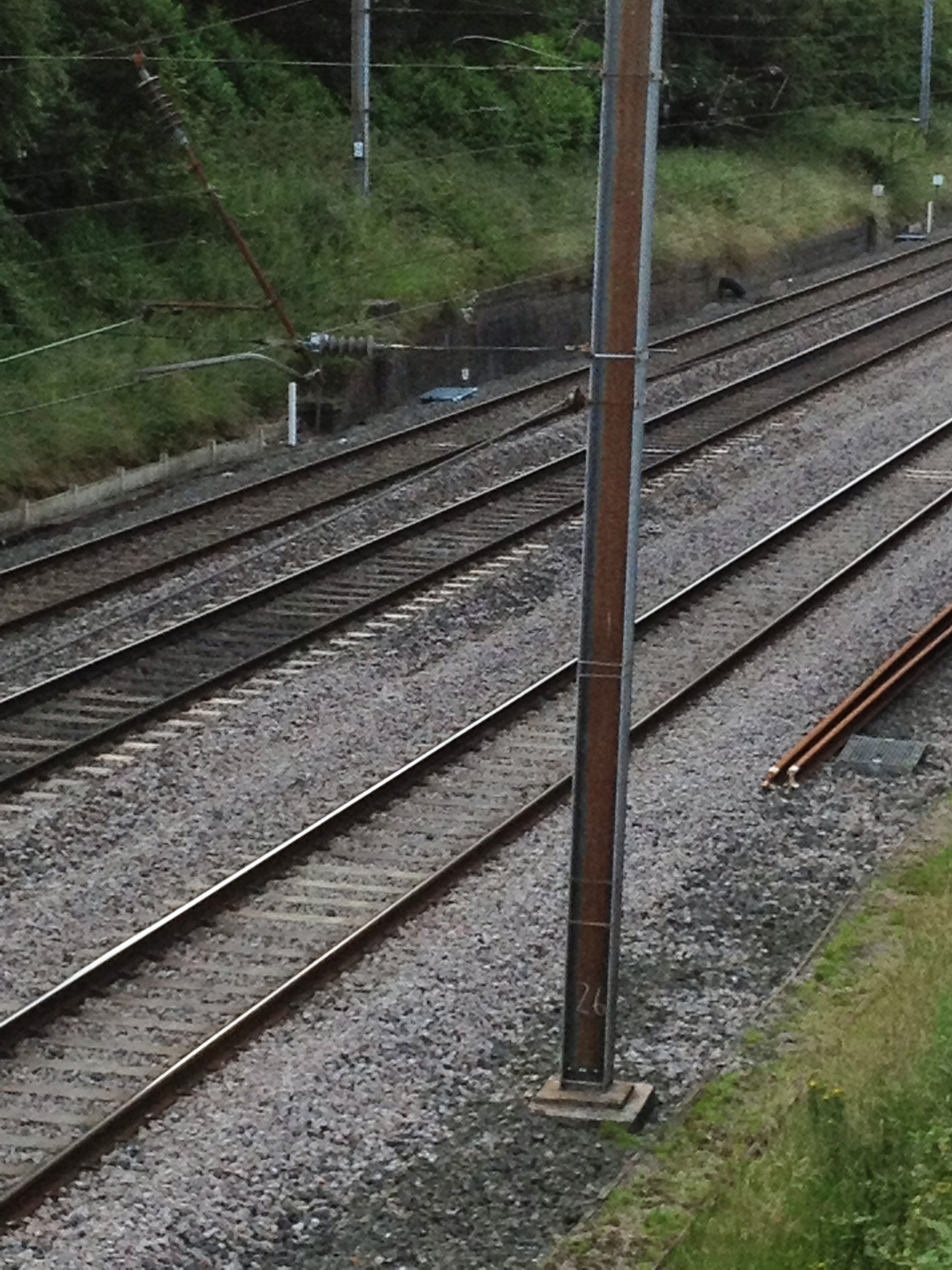
Corroding Steel Electrification Gantry

==== Splash zone and water spray corrosion ====
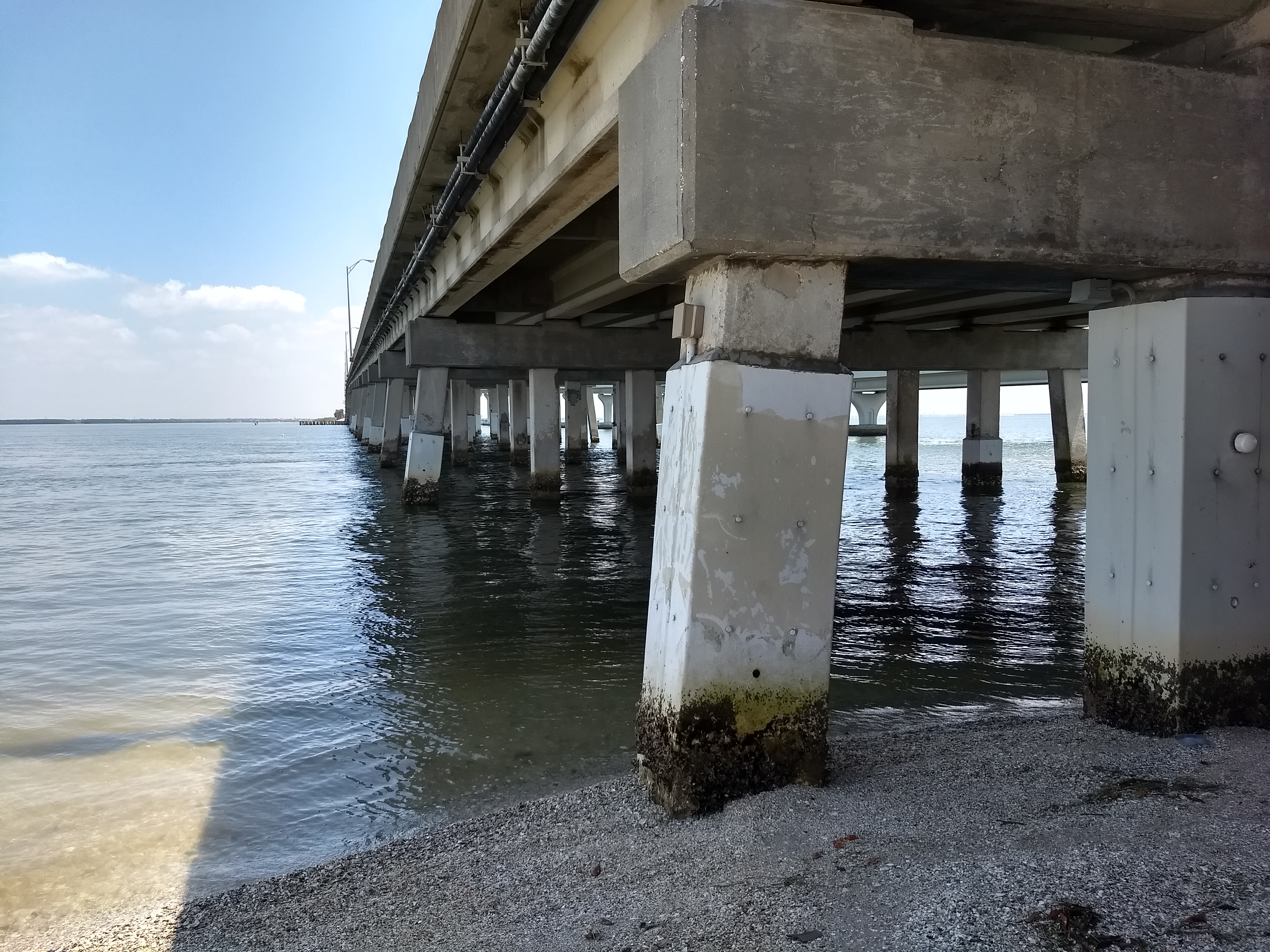
'Pile jackets' encasing old concrete bridge pilings to combat the corrosion that occurs when cracks in the pilings allow saltwater to contact internal steel reinforcement rods

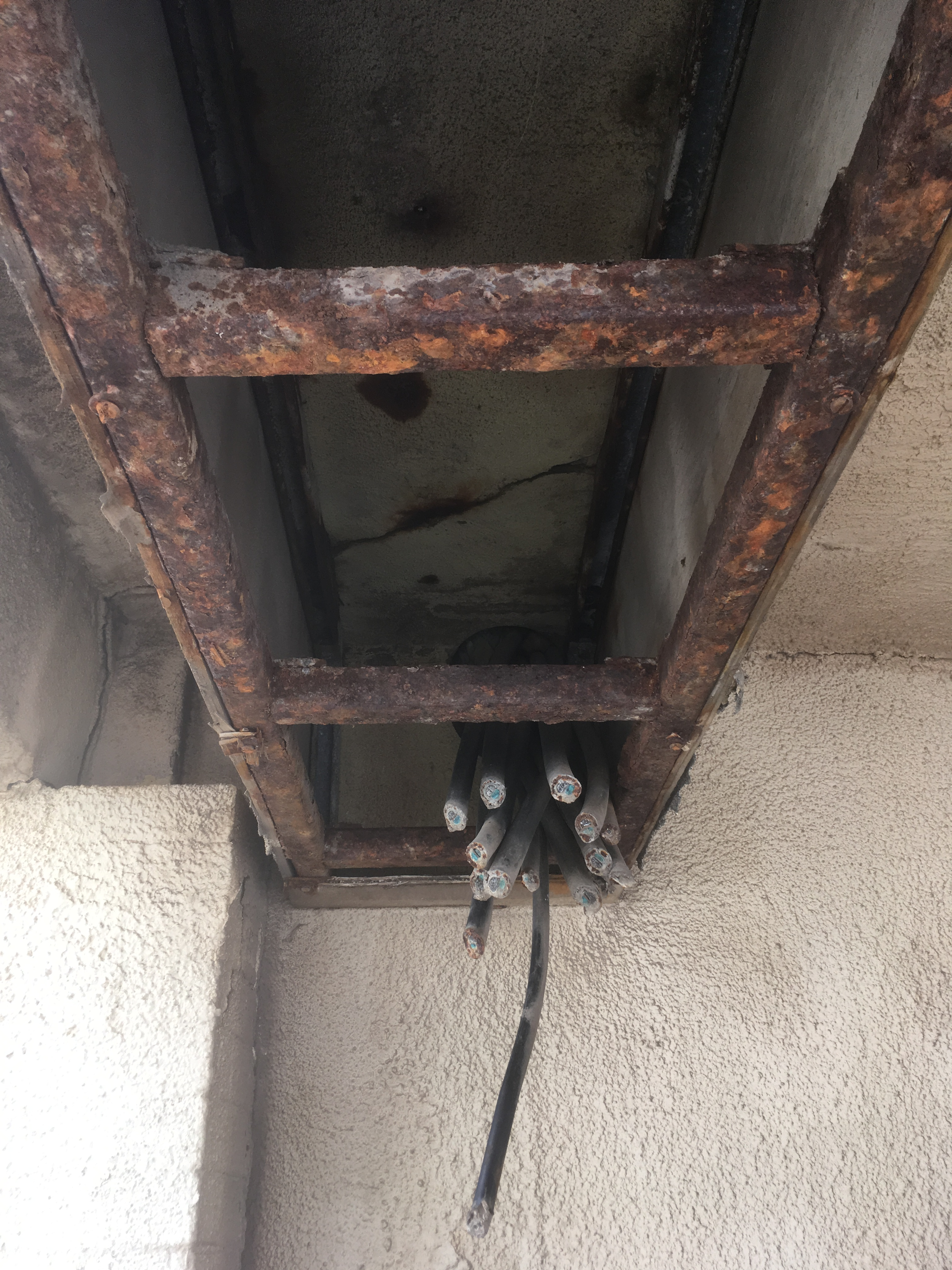
Structural member Blackpool Promenade at Bispham badly corroded

The usual definition of a splash zone is the area just above and just below the average water level of a body of water. It also includes areas that may be subject to water spray and mist.

A significant amount of corrosion of fences is due to landscaper tools scratching fence coatings and irrigation sprinklers spraying these damaged fences. Recycled water typically has a higher salt content than potable drinking water, meaning that it is more corrosive than regular tap water. The same risk from damage and water spray exists for above ground piping and backflow preventers. Fiberglass covers, cages, and concrete footings have worked well to keep tools at an arm's length. Even the location where a roof drain splashes down can matter. Drainage from a home's roof valley can fall directly down onto a gas meter causing its piping to corrode at an accelerated rate reaching 50% wall thickness within 4 years. It is the same effect as a splash zone in the ocean, or in a pool with lot of oxygen and agitation that removes material as it corrodes.

Tanks or structural tubing such as bench seat supports or amusement park rides can accumulate water and moisture if the structure does not allow for drainage. This humid environment can then lead to internal corrosion of the structure affecting the structural integrity. The same can happen in tropical environments leading to external corrosion. This would include Corrosion in ballast tanks on ships.

==== Pipeline corrosion ====
Hazardous materials are often carried in pipelines and thus their structural integrity is of paramount importance. Corrosion of a pipeline can thus have grave consequences. One of the methods used to control pipeline corrosion is by the use of Fusion bonded epoxy coatings. DCVG is used to monitor it. Impressed current cathodic protection is also used.

==== Corrosion in the petrochemical industry ====
The Petrochemical industry typically encounters aggressive corrosive media. These include sulfides and high temperatures. Corrosion control and solutions are thus necessary for the world economy. Scale formation in injection water presents its own problems with regard to corrosion and thus for the corrosion engineer.

==== Corrosion in ballast tanks ====
Ballast tanks on ships contain the fuels for corrosion. Water is one and air is usually present too and the water can become stagnant. Structural integrity is important for safety and to avoid marine pollution. Coatings have become the solution of choice to reduce the amount of corrosion in ballast tanks. Impressed current cathodic protection has also been used. Likewise sacrificial anode cathodic protection is also used. Since chlorides vastly accelerate corrosion, ballast tanks of marine vessels are particularly susceptible.

==== Corrosion in the railway industry ====
It has been stated that one of the biggest challenges in the United Kingdom railway industry is corrosion. The biggest problem is that corrosion can affect the structural integrity of passenger carrying railway carriages thus affecting their crashworthiness. Other railway structures and assets can also be affected. The Permanent Way Institution give lectures on the subject periodically. In January 2018 corrosion of a metal structure caused the emergency closure of Liverpool Lime Street railway station.

==== Galvanic corrosion ====
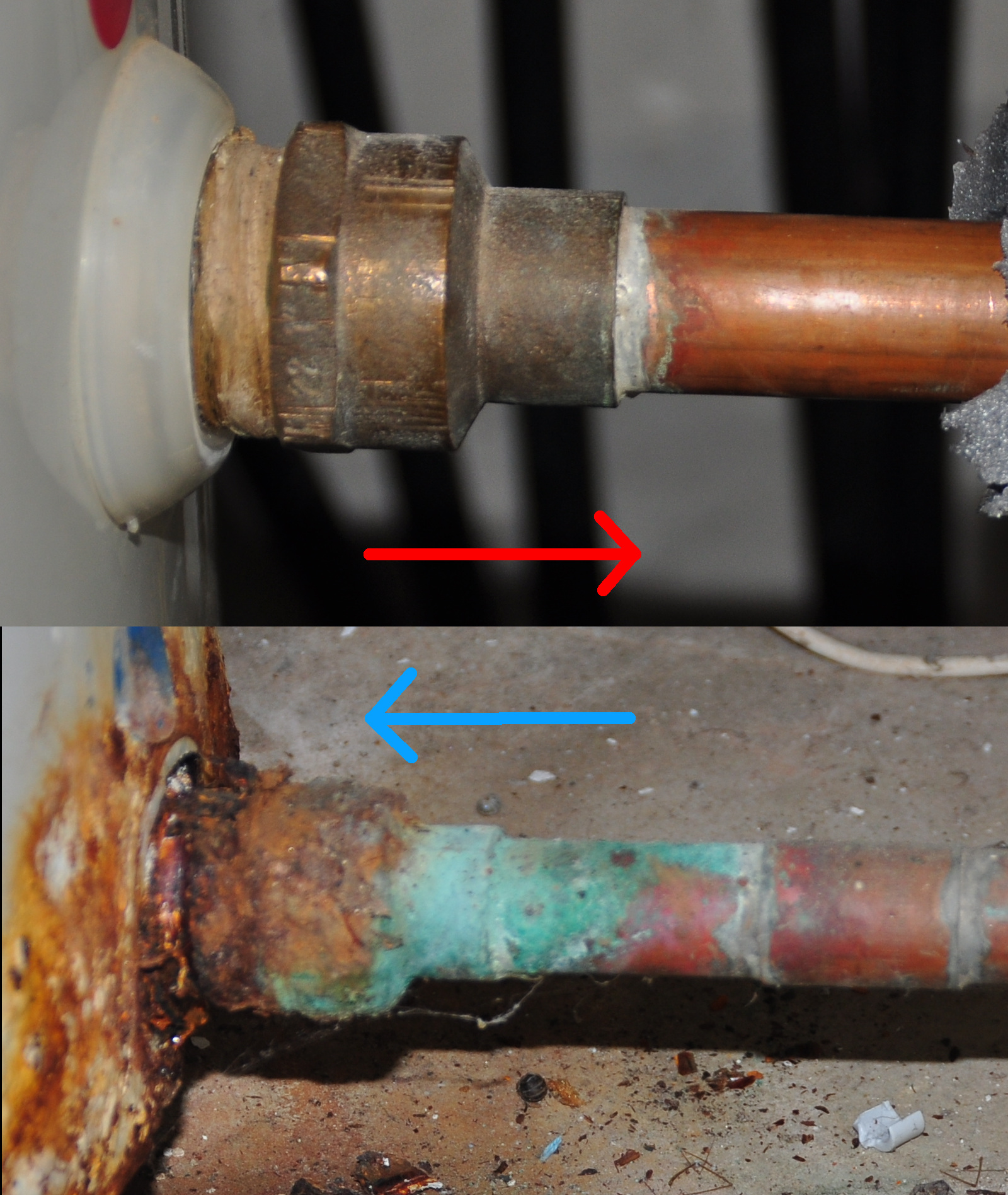
Bimetallic corrosion

Galvanic corrosion (also called bimetallic corrosion) is an electrochemical process in which one metal (more active one) corrodes preferentially when it is in electrical contact with another dissimilar metal, in the presence of an electrolyte. A similar galvanic reaction is exploited in primary cells to generate a useful electrical voltage to power portable devices – a classic example being a cell with zinc and copper electrodes. Galvanic corrosion is also exploited when a sacrificial metal is used in cathodic protection. Galvanic corrosion happens when there are an active metal and a more noble metal in contact in the presence of electrolyte.

==== Pitting corrosion ====
Pitting corrosion, or pitting, is extremely localized corrosion that leads to the creation of small holes in the material – nearly always a metal. The failures resulting from this form of corrosion can be catastrophic. With general corrosion it is easier to predict the amount of material that will be lost over time and this can be designed into the engineered structure. Pitting, like crevice corrosion can cause a catastrophic failure with very little loss of material. Pitting corrosion happens for passive materials. The classic reaction mechanism has been ascribed to Ulick Richardson Evans.

==== Crevice corrosion ====
Crevice corrosion is a type of localized corrosion with a very similar mechanism to pitting corrosion.

==== Stress corrosion cracking ====
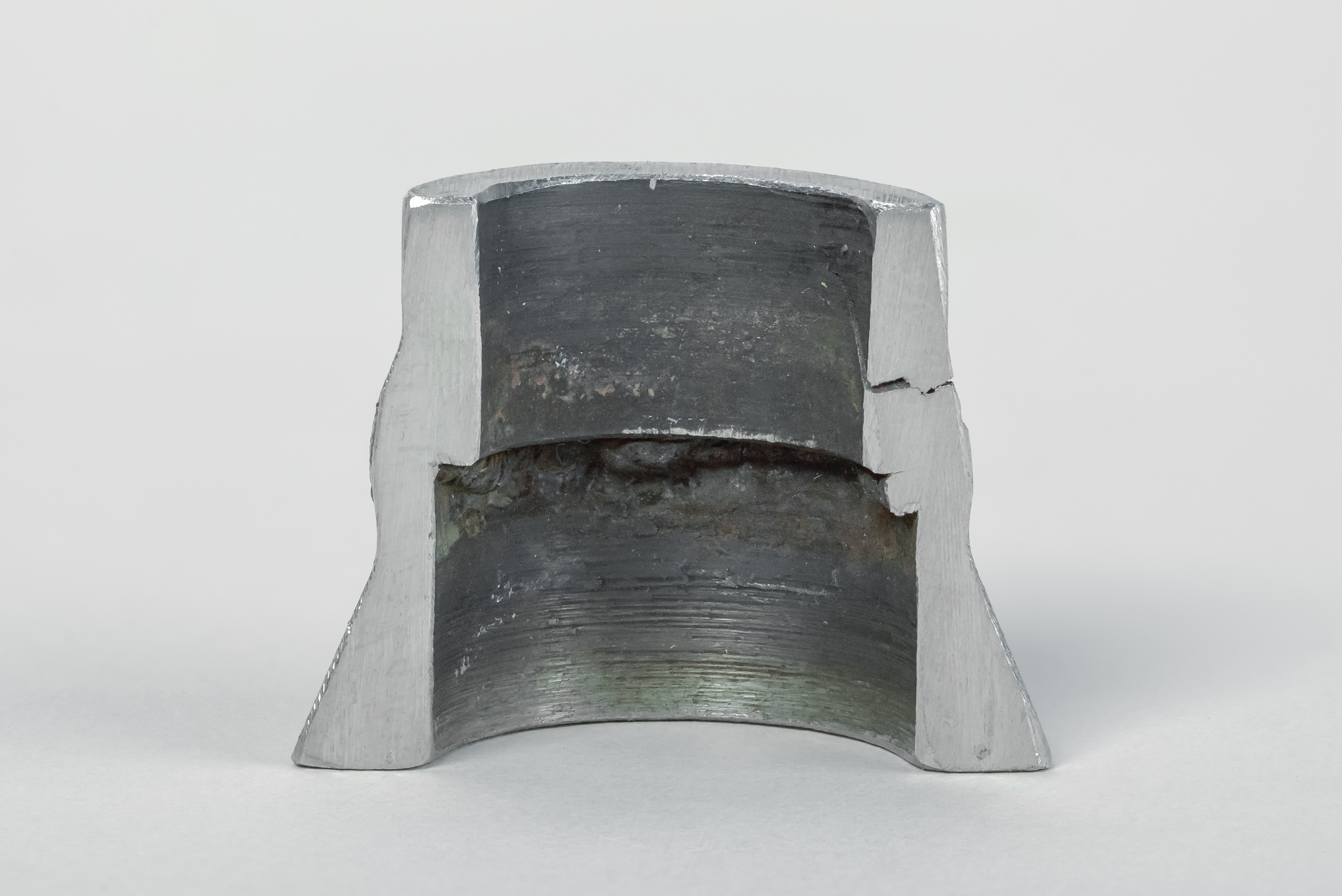
Stress-Corrosion-Cracking-Quench-Pipe-1.4541-01

Stress corrosion cracking (SCC) is the growth of a crack in a corrosive environment. It requires three conditions to take place: 1)corrosive environment 2)stress 3)susceptible material. SCC can lead to unexpected sudden and hence catastrophic failure of normally ductile metals under tensile stress. This is usually exacerbated at elevated temperature. SCC is highly chemically specific in that certain alloys are likely to undergo SCC only when exposed to a small number of chemical environments. It is common for SCC to go undetected prior to failure. SCC usually quite progresses rapidly after initial crack initiation, and is seen more often in alloys as opposed to pure metals. The corrosion engineer thus must be aware of this phenomenon.

==== Filiform Corrosion ====
Filiform corrosion may be considered as a type of crevice corrosion and is sometimes seen on metals coated with an organic coating (paint). Filiform corrosion is unusual in that it does not weaken or destroy the integrity of the metal but only affects the surface appearance.

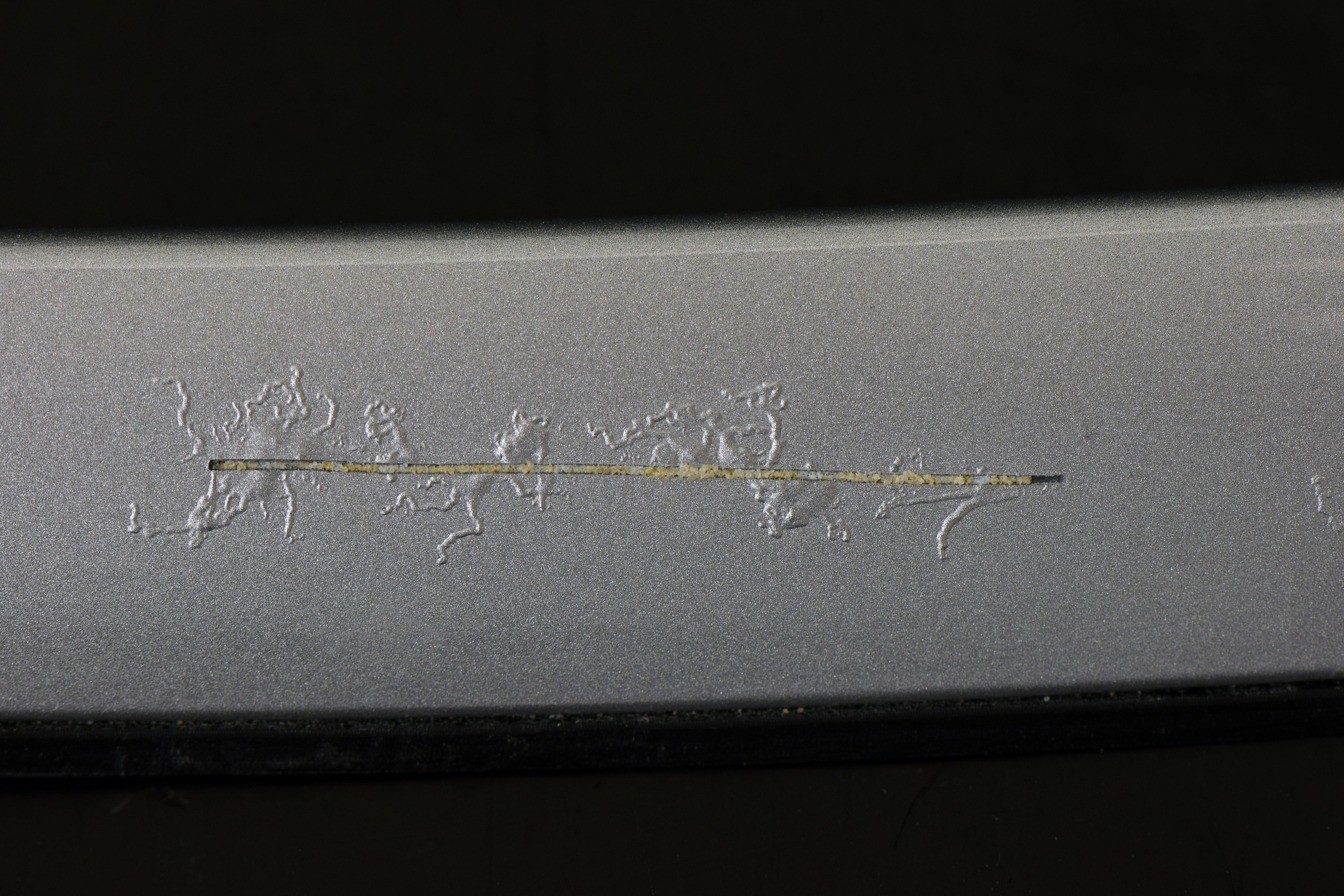
Filiform corrosion on painted aluminum

==== Corrosion fatigue ====
This form of corrosion is usually caused by a combination of corrosion and cyclic stress. Measuring and controlling this is difficult because of the many factors at play including the nature or form of the stress cycle. The stress cycles cause localized work hardening. So avoiding stress concentrators such as holes etc would be good corrosion engineering design.

==== Selective leaching ====
This form of corrosion occurs principally in metal alloys. The less noble metal of the alloy, is selectively leached from the alloy. Removal of zinc from brass is a more common example.

==== Microbial corrosion ====
Biocorrosion, biofouling and corrosion caused by living organisms are now known to have an electrochemistry foundation. Other marine creatures such as mussels, worms and even sponges have been known to degrade engineering materials.

==== Hydrogen damage ====
Hydrogen damage is caused by hydrogen atoms (as opposed to hydrogen molecules in the gaseous state), interacting with metal.

==== Erosion corrosion ====
Erosion corrosion is a form of corrosion damage usually on a metal surface caused by turbulence of a liquid or solid containing liquid and the metal surface. Aluminum can be particularly susceptible due to the fact that the aluminum oxide layer which affords corrosion protection to the underlying metal is eroded away.

==== Hydrogen embrittlement ====
This phenomenon describes damage to the metal (nearly always iron or steel) at low temperature by diffusible hydrogen. Hydrogen can embrittle a number of metals and steel is one of them. It tends to happen to harder and higher tensile steels. Hydrogen can also embrittle aluminum at high temperatures.). Titanium metal and alloys are also susceptible.

==== High temperature corrosion ====
High-temperature corrosion typically occurs in environments that have heat and chemical such as hydrocarbon fuel sources but also other chemicals enable this form of corrosion. Thus it can occur in boilers, automotive engines driven by diesel or gasoline, metal production furnaces and flare stacks from oil and gas production. High temperature oxidation of metals would also be included.

=== Internal corrosion ===
Internal corrosion is occasioned by the combined effects and severity of four modes of material deterioration, namely: general corrosion, pitting corrosion, microbial corrosion, and fluid corrosivity. The same principals of external corrosion control can be applied to internal corrosion but due to accessibility, the approaches can be different. Thus special instruments for internal corrosion control and inspection are used that are not used in external corrosion control. Video scoping of pipes and high tech smart pigs are used for internal inspections. The smart pigs can be inserted into a pipe system at one point and "caught" far down the line. The use of corrosion inhibitors, material selection studies, and internal coatings are mainly used to control corrosion in piping while anodes along with coatings are used to control corrosion in tanks. In-depth corrosion calculation are performed during material selection studies, and there are many different corrosion models and calculation methods (softwares) that are prevalent in industry. i.e ECE, Predict, De Waard, Norsok M-506 etc.

Internal corrosion challenges apply to the following amongst others: Water pipes; Gas pipes; Oil pipes and Water tank reservoirs.

== Good design to prevent corrosion situations ==
Corrosion engineering involves good design. Using a rounded edge rather than an acute edge reduces corrosion. Also not coupling by welding or other joining method, two dissimilar metals to avoid galvanic corrosion is best practice. Avoiding having a small anode (or anodic material) next to a large cathode (or cathodic material) is good practice. As an example, weld material should always be more noble than the surrounding material. Corrosion in ballast tanks on marine vessels can be an issue if good design is not undertaken. Other examples include simple design such as material thickness. In a known corrosion situation the material can just be made thicker so it will take much longer to corrode.

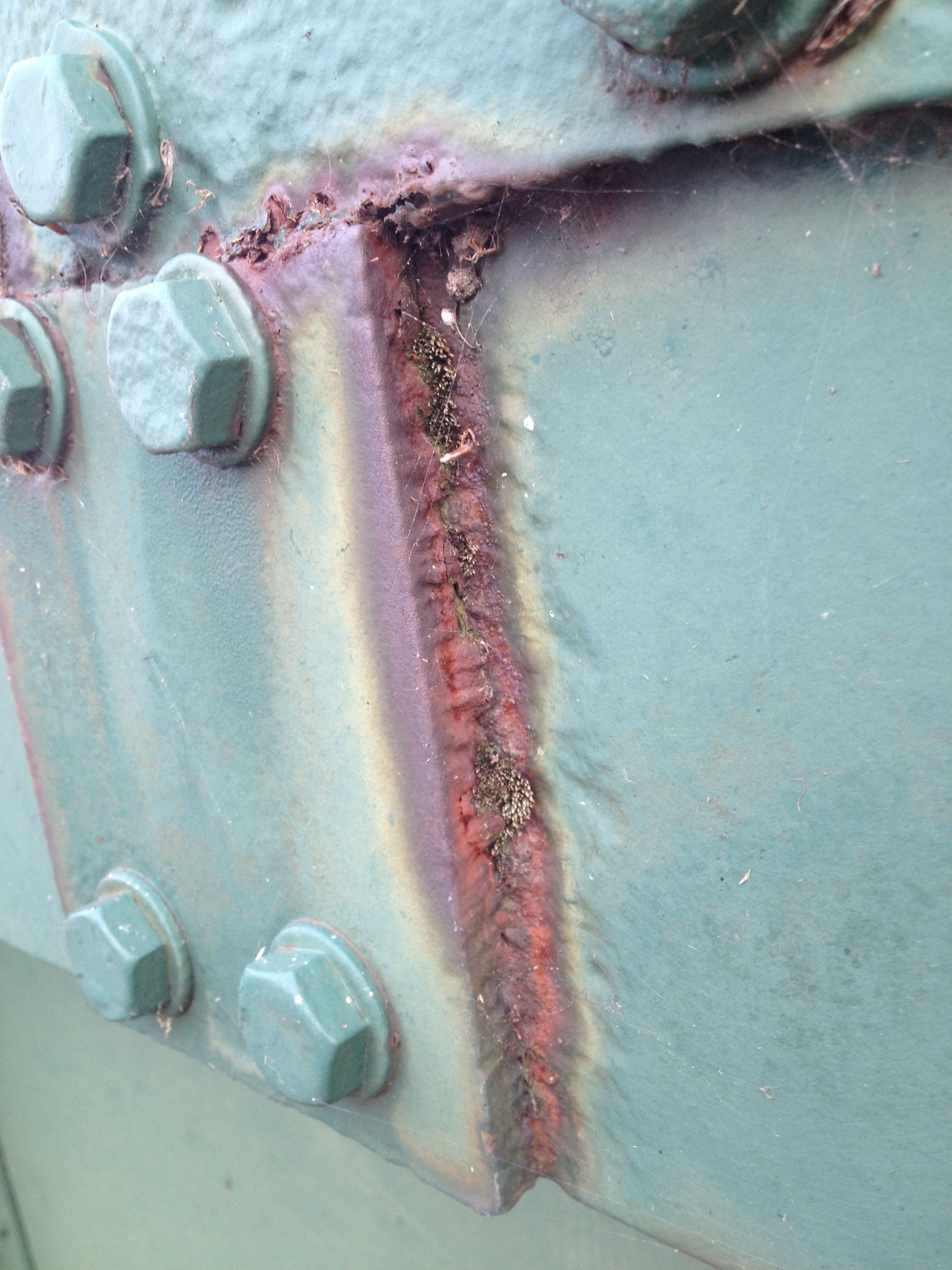
Corrosion at joint - bad design

== Material selection to prevent corrosion situations ==
Correct selection of the material by the design engineer affects the design life of a structure or pipeline which is very relevant in the Oil and Gas Industry. Sometimes stainless steel is not the correct choice and carbon steel would be better. There is a misconception that stainless steel has excellent corrosion resistance and will not corrode. This is not always the case and should not be used to handle deoxygenated solutions for example, as the stainless steel relies on oxygen to maintain passivation and is also susceptible to crevice corrosion.

Galvanizing or hot-dip galvanizing is used to coat steel with a layer of metallic zinc. Lead or antimony are often added to the molten zinc bath, and also other metals have been studied.

== Controlling the environment to prevent corrosion situations ==
One example of controlling the environment to prevent or reduce corrosion is the practice of storing aircraft in deserts. These storage places are usually called aircraft boneyards. The climate is usually arid so this and other factors make it an ideal environment.

== Use of corrosion inhibitors to prevent corrosion ==
An inhibitor is usually a material added in a small quantity to a particular environment that reduces the rate of corrosion. They may be classified a number of ways but are usually 1) Oxidizing; 2) Scavenging; 3) Vapor-phase inhibitors; Sometimes they are called Volatile corrosion inhibitor 4) Adsorption inhibitors; 5) Hydrogen-evolution retarder. Another way to classify them is chemically. As there is more concern for the environment and people are more keen to use Renewable resources, there is ongoing research to modify these materials so they may be used as corrosion inhibitors.

== Use of coatings to prevent corrosion ==
A coating or paint is usually a fluid applied covering applied to a surface in contact with a corrosive situation such as the atmosphere. The surface is usually called the substrate. In corrosion prevention applications the purpose of applying the coating is mainly functional rather than decorative. Paints and lacquers are coatings that have dual uses of protecting the substrate and being decorative, but paint on large industrial pipes as well as preventing corrosion is also used for identification e.g. red for fire-fighting control etc. Functional coatings may be applied to change the surface properties of the substrate, such as adhesion, wettability, corrosion resistance, or wear resistance. In the automotive industry, coatings are used to control corrosion but also for aesthetic reasons. Coatings are also extensively used in marine environments to control corrosion in an oceanic environment. Corrosion will eventually breakthrough a coating and so have a design life before maintenance.

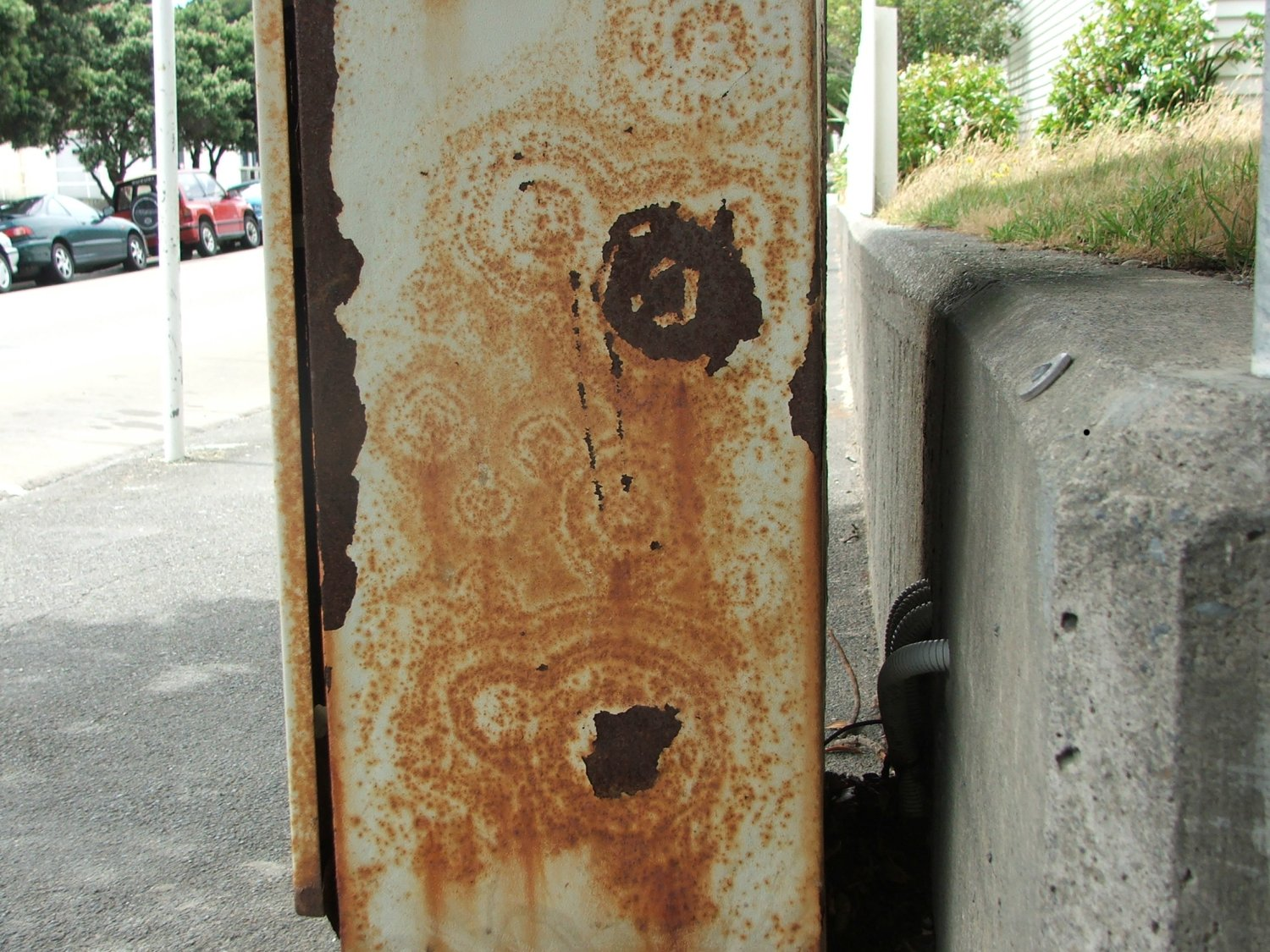
Concentric rust patterns breaking through a painted surface

== Societies ==
Corrosion societies are professional societies for corrosion engineers and scientists for the purpose of sharing research, experience and discoveries. They include:

- The Australasian Corrosion Association (ACA) was incorporated in 1958 as a not-for-profit primarily operating in Australasia.
- NACE International claimed to be the worldwide society with universally accepted standards. After various mergers, it was renamed as Association for Materials Protection and Performance. It is active in more than 130 countries and has more than 40,000 members.
- The European Federation of Corrosion (EFC) is an association of individual European country Corrosion societies joined in a larger umbrella group known as the European Federation of Corrosion. They meet at an annual congress named EUROCORR.
- The Institute of Corrosion (ICorr) is based in Northampton UK and was founded in 1959. They are members of the Science Council.

== See also ==
- Anodic protection
- Coating
- Corrosion
- Corrosion inhibitor
- Corrosion in ballast tanks
- DCVG (direct current voltage gradient)
- Electrochemistry
- Environmental stress cracking
- Fracture Mechanics
- Integrity engineering
- Metallurgical failure analysis
- National Institute of Standards and Technology
- Stainless steel
- Stress corrosion cracking
- Structural failure
- Sulfide stress cracking
