= Nick Birbilis =

Australian engineer and academic (born 1978)

- Birbilis in 2026
- Born: October 1978 (age 48); Melbourne, Victoria Australia
- Education: Monash University
- Occupation: Academic / Engineer
- Organization: Deakin University
- Known for: Corrosion Materials Science Metallurgy

Nick Birbilis is an Australian engineer and academic. He is presently the Executive Dean of the Faculty of Science, Engineering, and Built Environment, at Deakin University, where he is also a Deakin Distinguished Professor. Birbilis was previously the Deputy Dean and Interim Dean of the College of Engineering and Computer Science at the Australian National University. He is of Greek-Australian background. Birbilis works in the field of materials science and engineering, having made contributions in the area of materials design, materials durability and materials characterisation. He is a Fellow of the Electrochemical Society (US), a Fellow of NACE (US), a fellow of Engineers Australia, a Fellow of the International Society of Electrochemistry, a Fellow of ASM International (US) and a Fellow of the Royal Society of Chemistry.

== Early life and education ==
Birbilis was born in Melbourne, Australia. He attended Sandringham Secondary College, from where he gained admission to attend Monash University for a Bachelor of Engineering. He majored in materials engineering, graduating with First Class Honours. He took a particular interest in the field of corrosion, largely due to interesting interactions with the late Prof. Brian Cherry. Following graduation, Birbilis worked as a consulting engineer in Melbourne, with the company that is now AECOM, whilst also undertaking doctoral studies at Monash University. His PhD was regarding the corrosion, monitoring, and protection of concrete reinforcement. Following his PhD, Birbilis undertook postdoctoral research at the Fontana Corrosion Center at The Ohio State University, U.S., where he worked with Prof. Rudy Buchheit on the corrosion of aerospace alloys.

== Career ==
Following his post-doc at Ohio State, Birbilis commenced his academic career at Monash University in the Department of Materials Engineering, in 2006. He was promoted to senior lecturer in 2008, associate professor in 2011 and full professor in 2014, making him one of the youngest-ever engineering professors in Australia. In 2013, Birbilis was appointed as the head of the Department of Materials Engineering. He served in that role until 2018, during which he led the department's name change to the Department of Materials Science and Engineering, with a focus on student growth and diversity. Birbilis was the inaugural Woodside Innovation Chair at Monash University, where he directed the Woodside Innovation Centre in the areas of additive manufacturing, rapid prototyping, materials durability, data science, analytics and machine learning. In 2018, Birbilis moved to Canberra, Australia, to join the College of Engineering and Computer Science at the Australian National University (ANU) as Deputy Dean. He was drawn to the ANU on the basis of the ANU's plan to Reimagine the future of Engineering and Computer Science. Whilst at the ANU, Birbilis led a number of key initiatives, including the award winning redevelopment of the Birch Building, new programs in Aerospace Engineering and Environmental Systems, enhanced diversity in both staff and student profiles, along with working on a new School structure that gave rise to the nationally unique (and first) School of Cybernetics. In October 2022, Birbilis joined Deakin University as the Executive Dean of Science, Engineering and Built Environment. In this role, Birbilis is motivated to continue to make an impact in a future heavily reliant upon interdisciplinary approaches to societal and technological needs.

Throughout his career, Birbilis has continued to serve as a consultant with AECOM on projects that relate to materials durability.

Birbilis is also active in professional societies including NACE (where he was the chair of the Research Committee, and presently on numerous committees), the ACA (having served as Victorian President) and the Electrochemical Society. Birbilis was also the chair of the 2018 Gordon Research Conference on Aqueous Corrosion. Since 2010, Birbilis has been the associate editor for the journal Electrochimica Acta - which is the full length publication of the International Society of Electrochemistry. In 2017, Birbilis was named the inaugural editor-in-chief of the journal npj Materials Degradation, which is a new addition to the Nature family of journals with a specific focus on the durability of materials (of all types) and publishing a number of paper formats.

Birbilis has been awarded the ATSE Batterham Medal, and awards including the H.H. Uhlig Award and the U.R. Evans Award. He has also served as an adjunct professor at the Indian Institute of Technology Bombay. As of 2026 he had graduated over 65 PhD students.

== Contributions ==
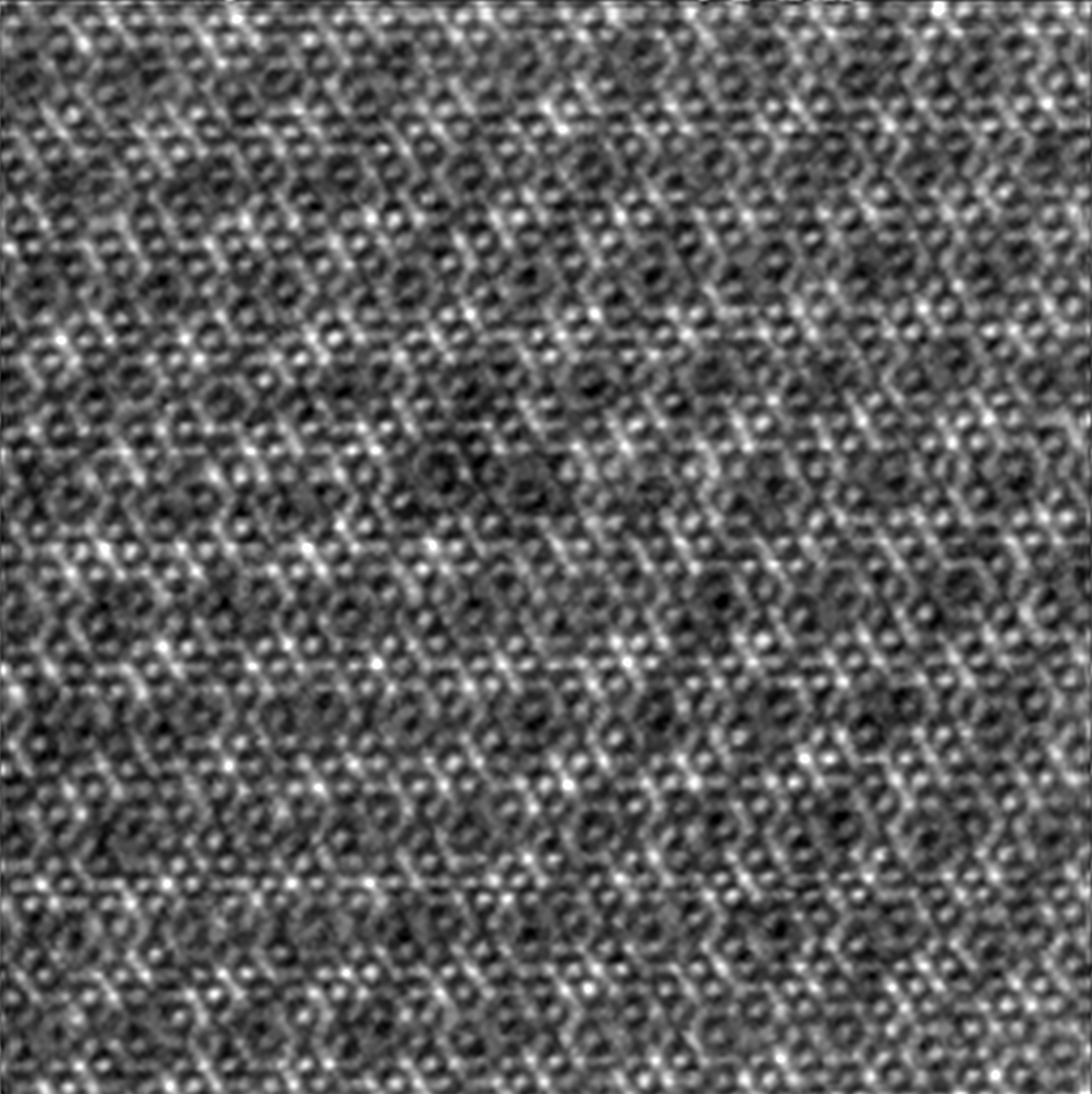
Atomic resolution Scanning-TEM micrograph of 'nu'-phase in SLM manufactured AA7075 (https://link.springer.com/article/10.1007/s11661-018-5025-1)

The work of Birbilis in the field of materials durability has been profound. Specifically, in the understanding of corrosion for engineering alloys and metallic materials. The studies he has led have provided insights into the corrosion of aluminium alloys, magnesium alloys, steels, high entropy alloys and additively manufactured alloys. Most recently he has been a pioneer in the utilisation of machine learning and A.I. in the field of materials durability and materials design.

Some of the key contributions of Birbilis include the presentation of a formalism that relates the grain size of metals to their corrosion rate.

In addition, Birbilis's group worked to define the size of microstructural features that trigger localised corrosion of engineering alloys. Such work involved the careful study of alloys structures on the nano- and atomic scale, whilst studying their metastable pitting (an automated web based tool to study metastable pitting from electrochemical data and published by Birbilis's group is available online.)

In the field of magnesium alloys, Birbilis and colleagues were reportedly the first to demonstrate magnesium alloys of reduced corrosion rate, and with colleagues at UNSW later developed a 'stainless' magnesium alloy as published in Nature Materials. Furthermore, Birbilis's group also demonstrated the ability to produce super-formable magnesium, publishing the study in Nature Communications.

In addition, his group has discovered new phases in metallic systems. One example of a new phase was the discovery of a previously unreported quasi-crystal in the aluminium alloy AA7075 - an alloy used for decades as the key structural alloy for aircraft - revealing the nanoscopic 'nu' (ν) phase following the production of the alloy using selective laser melting (metal 3D printing)

Research from Birbilis's group has also produced the web tool called 'Corrosion Detector', which employs crowd-sourced training of a machine learning model for automated detection of corrosion.
