= Corrosion Engineering, Science and Technology =

Scientific journal

- Discipline: Materials science
- Language: English
- Edited by: Mike Yongjun Tan

Publication details
- Former name: British Corrosion Journal
- History: 1965–present
- Publisher: Sage Publishing
- Frequency: 8/year
- Open access: Hybrid
- Impact factor: 1.9 (2024)

Standard abbreviations
- ISO 4: Corros. Eng. Sci. Technol.

Indexing
- CODEN: CESTBU
- ISSN: 1478-422X (print); 1743-2782 (web)

Links
- Journal homepage

Corrosion Engineering, Science and Technology is a peer-reviewed scientific journal published by Sage Publishing on behalf of the Institute of Materials, Minerals and Mining covering corrosion engineering, corrosion science, and corrosion control.

== History ==
The journal was established in 1965 as the British Corrosion Journal. It was launched as a publication of the British Joint Corrosion Group, which represented the interests of a number of professional organisations, including the Institute of Metals (later known as the Metals Society and the Institute of Materials), (Note: Other groups included the Iron and Steel Institute, the Society of Chemical Industry, and the Institute of Metal Finishing.) to promote corrosion as an independent area of expertise. In this way, it contrasted with existing journals in this field, namely Corrosion Science, which represented a more academic background.

In 1979, the Metals Society established the annual Guy Bengough Medal and Prize, which would be awarded to the best paper published in the previous two years.

In 2001, the Institute of Materials outsourced publication of 13 journals including 'the British Corrosion Journal to Maney Publishing. The next year, the institute merged into the Institute of Materials, Minerals and Mining. The journal had initially sourced the majority of its papers from the United Kingdom and the rest of the Commonwealth of Nations although it increasingly drew from more international sources over time. In 2003, the journal obtained its current title to reflect the international nature of the journal.

In 2015, Maney was acquired by Taylor & Francis. In May 2023, a publishing partnership with Sage Publishing was formed and they have published the journal since January 2024.

The journal is edited by Mike Yongjun Tan.

== Abstracting and indexing ==
The journal is abstracted and indexed in:

- Chemical Abstracts Service
- Science Citation Index Expanded
- Essential Science Indicators
- Inspec
- Scopus

According to the Journal Citation Reports, the journal has a 2024 impact factor of 1.9.
