= Branislav Hadzima =

Slovak materials scientist and academic administrator

- Born: 1976 (age 49–50); Levoča
- Known for: Elected Rector of the University of Žilina, research on corrosion of magnesium alloys
- Office: Rector of the University of Žilina
- Predecessor: prof. Ing. Ján Čelko, CSc.

Academic background
- Education: University of Žilina

Academic work
- Discipline: Materials science, Mechanical engineering
- Institutions: University of Žilina

Branislav Hadzima (born 1976 in Levoča, Slovakia) is a Slovak mechanical engineer, materials scientist, and university professor of materials engineering at the University of Žilina. His research focuses on corrosion science, surface engineering, and the electrochemical behavior of lightweight metallic materials.

Branislav Hadzima assumed office as Rector of the University of Žilina on 3 July 2026 for the 2026–2030 term.

== Early life and education ==
Branislav Hadzima was born in 1976 in Levoča, Slovakia. In 1994, he enrolled at the Faculty of Mechanical Engineering of the University of Žilina, where he specialized in materials engineering.

He completed his engineering degree (Ing.) in 1999 and subsequently entered doctoral studies. His PhD research, completed in 2003, focused on threshold states of materials and their role in fatigue and failure mechanisms. He later obtained his habilitation (Docent) in 2008 and was appointed full professor in materials engineering in 2017.

== Research ==
Hadzima's research is primarily situated in the field of corrosion science and materials engineering, with emphasis on electrochemical processes, surface treatments, and the durability of lightweight alloys such as magnesium and aluminum.

A major part of Hadzima's research examines the relationship between microstructure and corrosion behavior in ultrafine-grained (UFG) materials produced by severe plastic deformation techniques such as Equal Channel Angular Pressing (ECAP). His work demonstrated that grain refinement can both enhance and impair corrosion resistance depending on microstructural homogeneity and phase distribution.

Hadzima has contributed to the development of plasma electrolytic oxidation (PEO) coatings for magnesium alloys. His research emphasizes the role of electrolyte chemistry in improving coating performance, including reduced porosity and enhanced corrosion resistance. He also investigated laser surface treatments as pre-processing techniques to improve coating adhesion and tribological performance.

His research extends to biomedical applications, particularly biodegradable metals for orthopedic implants. He studied magnesium-based alloys and iron-based materials designed to degrade safely in physiological environments, contributing to the development of temporary implants that eliminate the need for surgical removal.

== Academic career and administration ==
Hadzima has spent his entire academic career at the University of Žilina, where he has held several academic and managerial positions.

In 2013, he co-founded the university's Research Centre (VC UNIZA), a major infrastructure project funded by the European Regional Development Fund. He served as its founding director until 2021. The center became a key hub for applied research, integrating disciplines such as materials science, transport systems, and renewable energy.

Hadzima has been actively involved in university governance. He served as Chairman of the Academic Senate of the University of Žilina for the 2023–2025 term. In this role, he oversaw legislative processes, budget approvals, and institutional strategy.

== Rector of the University of Žilina ==
On 30 March 2026, Hadzima was elected rector of the University of Žilina for the 2026–2030 term, succeeding Ján Čelko.

His appointment followed a vote by the university's electoral assembly, composed of members of the Academic Senate and Board of Directors.

He was formally appointed by President Peter Pellegrini on 20 May 2026 and assumed office on 3 July 2026.

== Professional affiliations ==
He has served as editor-in-chief of the scientific journal Communications – Scientific Letters of the University of Žilina.
