= SSPC-SP13/NACE No. 6 =

SSPC and NACE International joint standard

SSPC-SP13/NACE No. 6 Surface Preparation of Concrete is a SSPC and NACE International joint standard that covers the preparation of concrete surfaces prior to the application of protective coating or lining systems. This standard should be used by specifiers, applicators, inspectors, and other who are responsible for defining a standard degree of cleanliness, strength, profile, and dryness of prepared concrete surfaces prior to the application of a protective coating system.
