= Metallurgical failure analysis =

Metallurgical failure analysis is the process to determine the mechanism that has caused a metal component to fail. It can identify the cause of failure, providing insight into the root cause and potential solutions to prevent similar failures in the future, as well as culpability, which is important in legal cases. Resolving the source of metallurgical failures can be of financial interest to companies. The annual cost of corrosion (a common cause of metallurgical failures) in the United States was estimated by NACE International in 2012 to be $450 billion a year, a 67% increase compared to estimates for 2001. These failures can be analyzed to determine their root cause, which if corrected, would save reduce the cost of failures to companies.

Failure can be broadly divided into functional failure and expected performance failure. Functional failure occurs when a component or process fails and its entire parent system stops functioning entirely. This category includes the common idea of a component fracturing rapidly. Expected performance failures are when a component causes the system to perform below a certain performance criterion, such as life expectancy, operating limits, or shape and color. Some performance criteria are documented by the supplier, such as maximum load allowed on a tractor, while others are implied or expected by the customer, such gas consumption (miles per gallon for automobiles).

Often a combination of both environmental conditions and stress will cause failure. Metal components are designed to withstand the environment and stresses that they will be subjected to. The design of a metal component involves not only a specific elemental composition but also specific manufacturing process such as heat treatments, machining processes, etc. The huge arrays of different metals that result all have unique physical properties. Specific properties are designed into metal components to make them more robust to various environmental conditions. These differences in physical properties will exhibit unique failure modes. A metallurgical failure analysis takes into account as much of this information as possible during analysis. The ultimate goal of failure analysis is to provide a determination of the root cause and a solution to any underlying problems to prevent future failures.

== Failure investigation ==
The first step in failure analysis is investigating the failure to collect information. The sequence of steps for information gathering in a failure investigation are:

1. Collection information about the circumstances surrounding the failure and selection of specimens
2. Preliminary examination of the failed part (visual examination) and comparison with parts that have not failed
3. Macroscopic examination and analysis and photographic documentation of specimens (fracture surfaces, secondary cracks, and other surface phenomena)
4. Microscopic examination and analysis of specimens (fracture surfaces)
5. Selection and preparation of metallographic sections
6. Microscopic examination and analysis of prepared metallographic specimens
7. Nondestructive testing
8. Destructive/mechanical testing
9. Determination of failure mechanism
10. Chemical analysis (bulk, local, surface corrosion products, deposits or coatings)
11. Identify all possible root causes
12. Testing most likely possible root causes under simulated service conditions
13. Analysis of all the evidence, formulation of conclusions, and writing the report including recommendations

=== Techniques used ===
Various techniques are used in the investigative process of metallurgical failure analysis.

- Macroscopic examination: camera, stereoscope
- Microscopic examination: light microscopy, electron microscopy, x-ray microscopy, metallographic etching
- Mechanical testing: hardness testing, tensile testing, Charpy impact testing
- Chemical testing: microprobe analysis, energy dispersive spectroscopy

Non-destructive testing: Non-destructive testing is a test method that allows certain physical properties of metal to be examined without taking the samples completely out of service. NDT is generally used to detect failures in components before the component fails catastrophically.

Destructive testing: Destructive testing involves removing a metal component from service and sectioning the component for analysis. Destructive testing gives the failure analyst the ability to conduct the analysis in a laboratory setting and perform tests on the material that will ultimately destroy the component.

== Metallurgical failure modes ==
There is no standardized list of metallurgical failure modes and different metallurgists might use a different name for the same failure mode. The failure mode terms listed below are those accepted by ASTM, ASM, and/or NACE as distinct metallurgical failure mechanisms.

=== Caused by corrosion and stress ===
- Stress corrosion cracking Stress corrosion (NACE term)
- Corrosion fatigue
- Caustic cracking (ASTM term)
- Caustic embrittlement (ASM term)
- Sulfide stress cracking (ASM, NACE term)
- Stress-accelerated Corrosion (NACE term)
- Hydrogen stress cracking (ASM term)
- Hydrogen-assisted stress corrosion cracking (ASM term)

=== Caused by stress ===
- Fatigue (ASTM, ASM term)
- Mechanical overload
- Creep
- Rupture
- Cracking (NACE term)
- Embrittlement

=== Caused by corrosion ===
- Erosion corrosion
- Pitting corrosion Oxygen pitting
- Hydrogen embrittlement
- Hydrogen-induced cracking (ASM term)
- Corrosion embrittlement (ASM term)
- Hydrogen disintegration (NACE term)
- Hydrogen-assisted cracking (ASM term)
- Hydrogen blistering
- Corrosion

== Potential root causes ==
Potential root causes of metallurgical failures are vast, spanning the lifecycle of component from design to manufacturing to usage. The most common reasons for failures can be classified into the following categories:

=== Service or operation conditions ===
Failures due to service or operation conditions includes using a component outside of its intended conditions, such as an impact force or a high load. It can also include failures due to unexpected conditions in usage, such as an unexpected contact point that causes wear and abrasion or an unexpected humidity level or chemical presence that causes corrosion. These factors result in the component failing at an earlier time than expected.

=== Improper maintenance ===
Improper maintenance would cause potential sources of fracture to go untreated and lead to premature failure of a component in the future. The reason for improper maintenance could be either intentional, such as skipping a yearly maintenance to avoid the cost, or unintentional, such as using the wrong engine oil.

=== Improper testing or inspection ===
Testing and/or inspection are typically included in component manufacturing lines to verify the product meets some set of standards to ensure the desired performance in the field. Improper testing or inspection would circumvent these quality checks and could allow a part with a defect that would normally disqualify the component from field use to be sold to a customer, potentially leading to a failure.

=== Fabrication or manufacturing errors ===
Manufacturing or fabrication errors occur during the processing of the material or component. For metal parts, casting defects are common, such as cold shut, hot tears or slag inclusions. It can also be surface treatment problems, processing parameters such as ramming a sand mold or wrong temperature during hardening.

=== Design errors ===
Design errors arise when the desired use case was not properly accounted for, leading to an ineffective design, such as the stress state in service or potential corrosive agents in the service environment. Design errors often include dimensioning and materials selection, but it can also be the complete design.

== Use of computational methods for failure analysis ==
Computational methods have been increasing in popularity as a method to test possible root because they do not need to sacrifice a component to prove a root cause. Common cases where computational methods are used are for failures due to erosion, failures of components under complex stress states, and for predictive analyses. Computational fluid dynamics is used to determine the flow pattern and shear stresses on a component that had failed due to erosive wear. Finite element analysis is used to model components under complex stress states. Finite element analysis as well as phase field models can be used for predicting crack propagation and failure, which are then used to prevent failure by influencing component design.

== See also ==
- Forensic engineering
- Corrosion engineering
- Failure analysis
- Fracture
- Fracture mechanics
