= Corrosion in ballast tanks =

Corrosion in Ballast Tanks is the deterioration process where the surface of a ballast tank progresses from microblistering, to loss of tank coating, and finally to cracking of the tank steel itself.

“Effective corrosion control in segregated water ballast spaces is probably the single most important feature, next to the integrity of the initial design, in determining the ship’s effective life span and structural reliability,” said Alan Gavin, Germanischer Lloyd's Principal surveyor.

Throughout the years the merchant fleet has become increasingly aware of the importance of avoiding corrosion in ballast tanks.

== Factors influencing corrosion in ballast tanks ==
Epoxy and modified epoxy are standard coatings used to provide protective barriers to corrosion in ballast tanks. Exposed, unprotected steel will corrode much more rapidly than steel covered with this protective layer. Many ships also use sacrificial anodes or an impressed current for additional protection. Empty ballast tanks will corrode faster than areas fully immersed due to the thin - and electo conducting - moisture film covering them.

The main factors influencing the rate of corrosion are diffusion, temperature, Conductivity, type of ions, pH, and electrochemical corrosion potential.

== Regions of a ballast tank ==
Ballast tanks do not corrode uniformly throughout the tank. Each region behaves distinctively, according to it electrochemical loading. The differences can especially be seen in empty ballast tanks. The upper sections usually corrode but the lower sections will blister.

A ballast tank has three distinct sections: 1) upper, 2) mid or "boottop" area and, 3) the "double bottom" or lower wing sections. The upper regions are constantly affected by weather. This area experiences a high degree of thermal cycling and mechanical damage through vibration. This area tends to undergo anodic oxidation more rapidly than other sections and will weaken more rapidly. This ullage or headspace area contains more oxygen and thus speeds atmospheric corrosion, as evidenced by the appearance of rust scales.

In the midsection corrodes more slowly than upper or the bottom sections of the tank.

Double bottoms are prone to cathodic blistering. Temperatures in this area are much lower due to the cooling of the sea. If this extremely cathodic region is placed close to an anodic source (e.g. a corroding ballast pipe), cathodic blistering may occur especially where the epoxy coating is relatively new. Mud retained in ballast water can lead to microbial corrosion.

== Marine regulations ==
Many maritime accidents have been caused by corrosion, and this has led to stringent regulations concerning protective coatings for ballast tanks. The Coating Performance Standard for Ballast Tank Coatings (PSPC), became effective in 2008. It specifies how protective coatings should be applied during vessel construction with the intention of giving a coating a 15-year service life. Additional regulations, such as those established by The International Convention for the Control and Management of Ships Ballast Water & Sediments (SBWS) sought to avoid introducing invasive species throughout the world through ship's ballast tanks. The methods used to avoid having these invasive species surviving in ballast tanks however greatly increased the rate of corrosion. Therefore ongoing research attempts to find water treatment systems that kill invasive species, while not having a destructive effect on the ballast tank coatings. As double-hulled tankers were introduced it meant that there was more ballast tank area had to be coated and therefore a greater capital investment for ship owners. With the onset of the OPA 90 and later the amendments to MARPOL annex 1, single hull tankers (without alternative method) have basically phased out.

Modern double hull tankers, with their fully "segregated ballast tanks" propose another problem. Empty tanks act as insulation from the cold sea and allow the warm cargo areas to retain their heat longer. Corrosion rates increase with differences in temperature. Consequently, the cargo side of the ballast tank corrodes more quickly than it did with single hull tankers.

== See also ==
- Corrosion engineering
