= Metallurgy =

Field of science that studies the physical and chemical behavior of metals

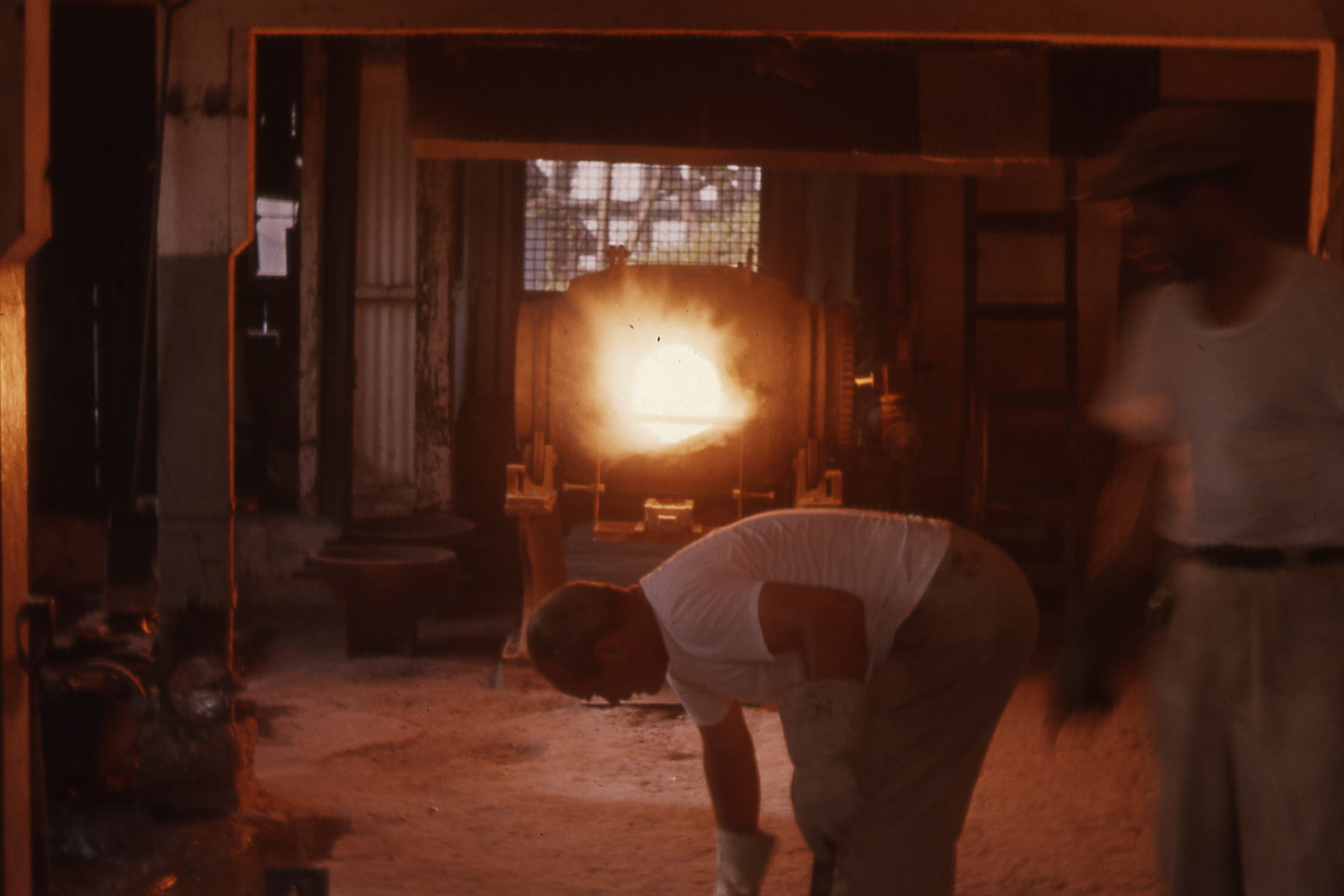
Gold smelting workers in Siuna, Nicaragua c. 1960

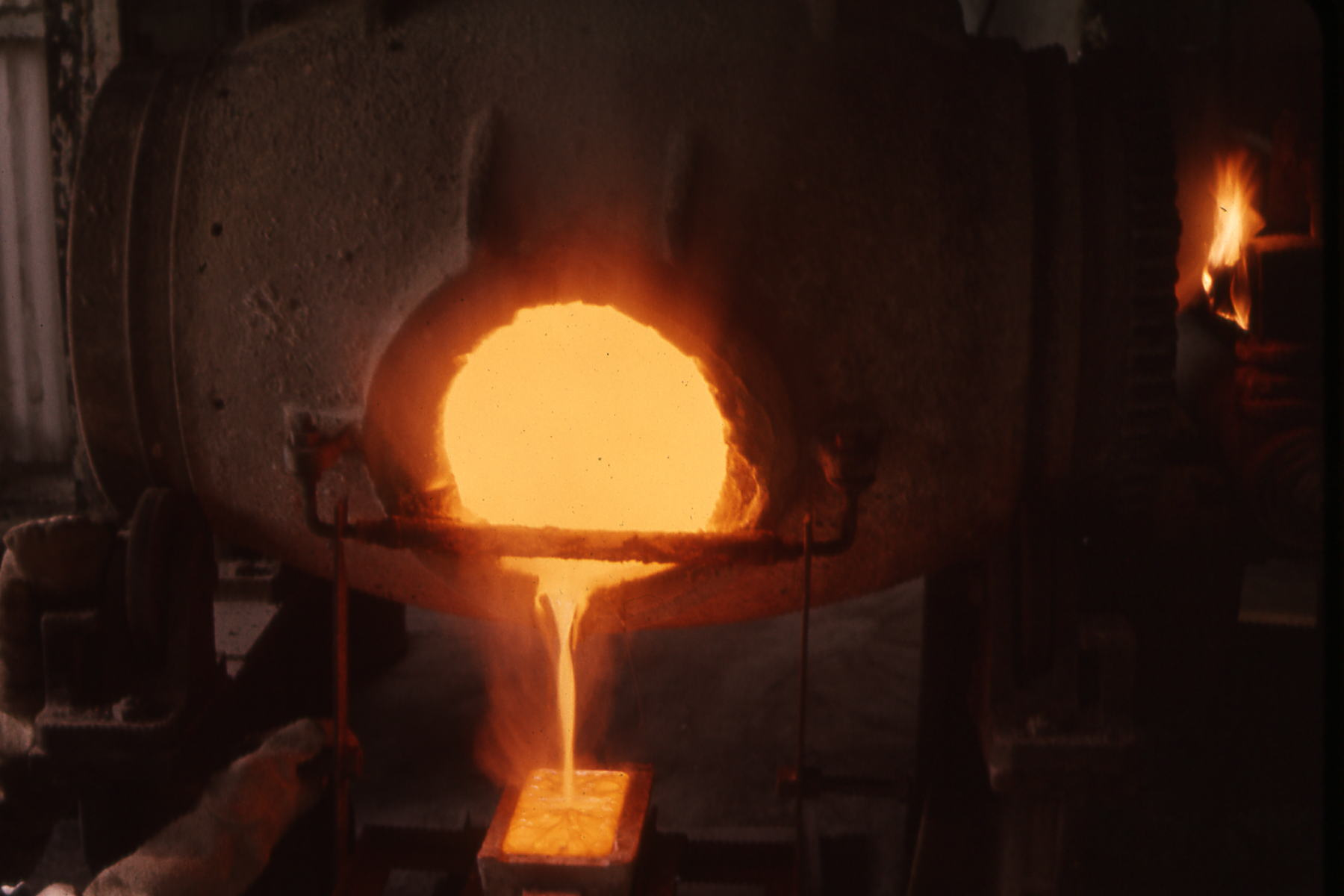
Casting, the process of pouring molten metal into a mold

Metallurgy is a domain of materials science and engineering that studies the physical and chemical behavior of metallic elements, their inter-metallic compounds, and their mixtures, which are known as alloys.

Metallurgy encompasses both the science and the technology of metals, including their production and the engineering of metal components used in products for both consumers and manufacturers. Metallurgy is distinct from the craft of metalworking by providing it with a scientific foundation, much as medical science supports the practice of medicine. A specialist practitioner of metallurgy is known as a metallurgist.

A metallurgist or metallurgical engineer is a scientist or engineer who studies the physical and chemical properties of metals and their alloys to design, developing process and improve them for industrial use.

The science of metallurgy is further subdivided into two broad categories: chemical metallurgy and physical metallurgy. Chemical metallurgy is chiefly concerned with the reduction and oxidation of metals, and the chemical performance of metals. Subjects of study in chemical metallurgy include mineral processing, the extraction of metals, thermodynamics, electrochemistry, and chemical degradation (corrosion). In contrast, physical metallurgy focuses on the mechanical properties of metals, the physical properties of metals, and the physical performance of metals. Topics studied in physical metallurgy include crystallography, material characterization, mechanical metallurgy, phase transformations, and failure mechanisms.

Historically, metallurgy has predominantly focused on the production of metals. Metal production begins with the processing of ores to extract the metal, and includes the mixture of metals to make alloys. Metal alloys are often a blend of two or more metallic elements. However, non-metallic elements are often added to alloys in order to achieve properties suitable for an application. The study of metal production is subdivided into ferrous metallurgy (also known as black metallurgy) and non-ferrous metallurgy, also known as colored metallurgy.

Ferrous metallurgy involves processes and alloys based on iron, while non-ferrous metallurgy involves processes and alloys based on other metals. The production of ferrous metals accounts for 95% of world metal production.

Modern metallurgists work in both emerging and traditional areas as part of an interdisciplinary team alongside material scientists and other engineers. Some traditional areas include mineral processing, metal production, heat treatment, failure analysis, and the joining of metals (including welding, brazing, and soldering). Emerging areas for metallurgists include nanotechnology, superconductors, composites, biomedical materials, electronic materials (semiconductors) and surface engineering.

== Etymology and pronunciation ==
Metallurgy derives from the Ancient Greek μεταλλουργός, metallourgós, "worker in metal", from μέταλλον, métallon, "mine, metal" + ἔργον, érgon, "work" The word was originally an alchemist's term for the extraction of metals from minerals, the ending -urgy signifying a process, especially manufacturing; it was discussed in this sense in the 1797 Encyclopædia Britannica.

In the late 19th century, metallurgy's definition was extended to the more general scientific study of metals, alloys, and related processes. In English, the /mɛˈtælərdʒi/ pronunciation is the more common one in the United Kingdom, while /ˈmɛtəlɝdʒi/ pronunciation is the more common one in the United States and is the first-listed variant in various American dictionaries, including Merriam-Webster Collegiate and American Heritage.

== History ==
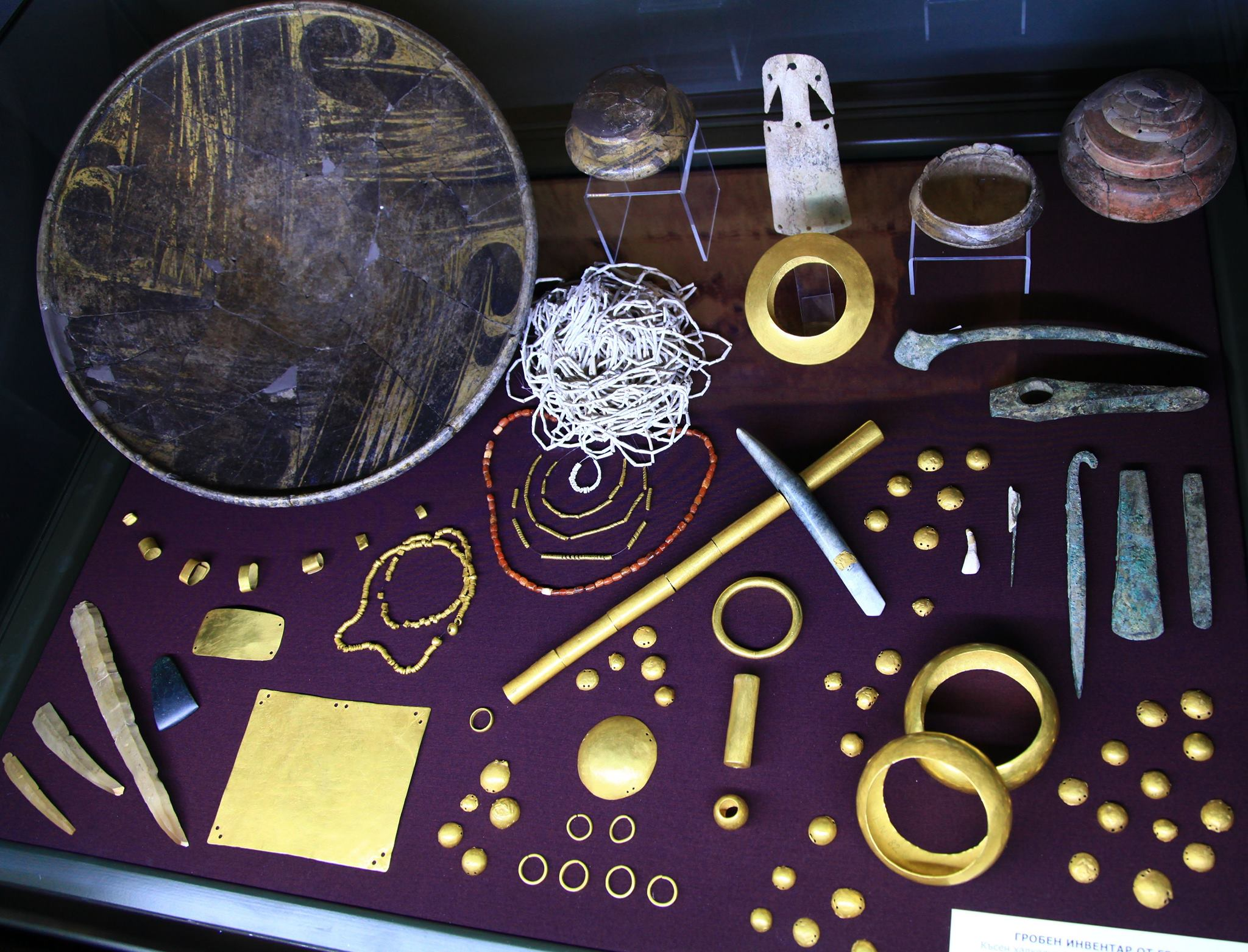
Artefacts from the Varna Necropolis in present-day Bulgaria

The mining areas of the ancient Middle East with arsenic (in brown), copper (in red), tin (in grey), iron (in reddish brown), gold (in yellow), silver (in white), lead (in black), arsenic bronze (in yellow), and tin bronze (in grey)

The earliest metal employed by humans appears to be gold, which can be found "native". Small amounts of natural gold, dating to the late Paleolithic period, 40,000 BCE, have been found in Spanish caves. Silver, copper, tin and meteoric iron can also be found in native form, allowing a limited amount of metalworking in early cultures. Early cold metallurgy, using native copper that was not smelted from ore has been documented at sites in Anatolia and at the site of Tell Maghzaliyah in Iraq, dating from the 7th~6th millennia BCE.

The earliest archaeological support of smelting (hot metallurgy) in Eurasia is found in the Balkans and Carpathian Mountains, as evidenced by findings of objects made by metal casting and smelting dated to around 6,200 ~ 5,000 BCE, with the invention of copper metallurgy. Certain metals, such as tin, lead, and copper can be recovered from their ores by simply heating the rocks in a comparatively moderate-temperature fire or blast furnace in a process known as smelting. The first evidence of copper smelting, dating from the 6th millennium BCE, has been found at archaeological sites in Majdanpek, Jarmovac, and Pločnik, in present-day Serbia. The site of Pločnik has produced a smelted copper axe dating from 5,500 BCE, belonging to the Vinča culture. The Balkans and adjacent Carpathian region were the location of major Chalcolithic cultures including Vinča, Varna, Karanovo, Gumelnița and Hamangia, which are often grouped together under the name of 'Old Europe'. With the Carpatho-Balkan region described as the 'earliest metallurgical province in Eurasia', its scale and technical quality of metal production in the 6th~5th millennia BCE totally overshadowed that of any other contemporary production centre. (Note: The scale and technical quality of the Carpathian-Balkan copper industry totally overshadows that of any other contemporary production centre. This, together with the late sixth-millennium date for its beginning, gives strong support to the suggestion that the art of copper smelting was first perfected in the Balkans. The region can also claim to be the first to produce gold, beginning in the mid-fifth millennium, five hundred years or more before the earliest gold objects appear in the Near East. — Cunliffe (2015), p. 105) (Note: The general area of the Carpatho-Balkan Metallurgical Province (CBMP) equaled approximately 1.5 million sq. km spread from the Danubian basin in the Western flank to the Mid and Lower Volga basin in the Eastern flank of this province. The most characteristic features of the CBMP are (1) casting and hammering of various heavy tools and weapons made from chemically pure copper; (2) a big number of gold decorations and ornaments. Metallurgical revolution and CBMP formation emerged independently from centers of the Proto-Metal area [in the Middle East] where in the 5th millennium BCE there continued a limited production of primitive handmade copper goods. — Chernykh (2014))

The earliest documented use of lead (possibly native or smelted) in the Near East dates from the 6th millennium BCE, is from the late Neolithic settlements of Yarim Tepe and Arpachiyah in Iraq. The artifacts suggest that lead smelting may have predated copper smelting. Metallurgy of lead has also been found in the Balkans during the same period.

Copper smelting is documented at sites in Anatolia and at the site of Tal-i Iblis in southeastern Iran from c. 5,000 BCE.

Copper smelting is first documented in the Delta region of northern Egypt in c. 4,000 BCE, associated with the Maadi culture. This represents the earliest evidence for smelting in Africa. (Note: Egypt and adjacent regions closely mimic the metallurgical trajectories of the nearby Middle East. Egyptian metallurgy started with the working of copper around 4,000 BCE. The earliest evidence for metallurgy in Africa comes from the Nile Delta, in Egypt, and is associated with the Maadi culture dating between 4,000 ~ 3,200 BCE. — Chirikure (2015), pp. 17, 19)

The Varna Necropolis, Bulgaria, is a burial site located in the western industrial zone of Varna, approximately 4 km from the city centre, internationally considered one of the key archaeological sites in world prehistory. The oldest gold treasure in the world, dating from 4,600 BC – 4,200 BCE, was discovered at Varna. The gold piece dating from 4,500 BCE, found in 2019 in Durankulak, near Varna is another important example. Other signs of early metals are found from the 3rd millennium BCE in Palmela, Portugal, Los Millares, Spain, and Stonehenge, United Kingdom. The precise beginnings, however, have not been clearly ascertained and new discoveries are both continuous and ongoing.

In approximately 1,900 BCE, ancient iron smelting sites existed in Tamil Nadu.

In the Near East, about 3,500 BCE, it was discovered that the superior metal bronze could be made by combining copper and tin. This represented a major technological shift known as the Bronze Age.

The extraction of iron from its ore into a workable metal is much more difficult than for copper or tin. The process appears to have been invented by the Hittites in about 1,200 BCE, beginning the Iron Age. The ability to extract and work iron was a key factor in the success of the Philistines.

Historical developments in ferrous metallurgy can be found in a wide variety of past cultures and civilizations. This includes the ancient and medieval kingdoms and empires of the Middle East and Near East, ancient Iran, ancient Egypt, ancient Nubia, and Anatolia in present-day Turkey, Ancient Nok, Carthage, the Celts, Greeks and Romans of ancient Europe, medieval Europe, ancient and medieval China, ancient and medieval India, ancient and medieval Japan, amongst others.

Wootz process was developed and practiced in the Indian subcontinent as early as 300 BCE—although certainly by 200 BCE high-quality steel was being produced in southern India, by what Europeans would later call the crucible technique. Golconda steel, also called Wootz steel is an ultra-high-carbon steel, with a natural inclusion of carbide-forming vanadium (~0.005%), resulting in the formation of nanomaterials in its microstructure and characterised by exhibiting properties such as superplasticity and high impact hardness. Archaeological and Tamil language literary evidence suggests that this manufacturing process was already in existence in South India well before the common era, with wootz steel exported from the Chera dynasty and called Seric Iron in Rome, and later known as Damascus steel in Europe. Reproduction research undertaken by Prof. J.D Verhoeven and Al Pendray identified the role of impurities within the local ore, in carbide formation, and repeated thermal cycling of blades, in the pattern creation, and reproduced Wootz steel blades with patterns microscopically and visually identical to ancient blade patterns.

A 16th century book by Georg Agricola, De re metallica, describes the highly developed and complex processes of mining metal ores, metal extraction, and metallurgy of the time. Agricola has been described as the "father of metallurgy".

== Extraction ==
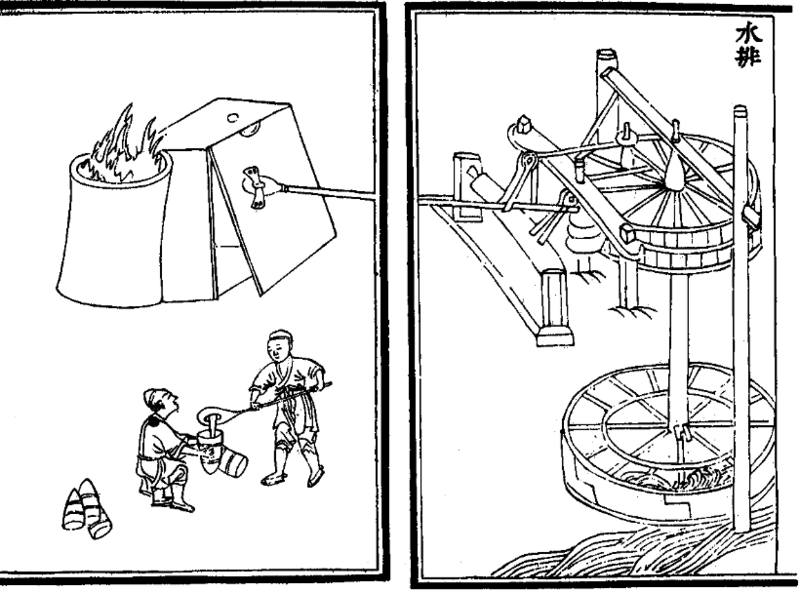
An illustration of a furnace bellows operated by waterwheels during the Yuan Dynasty in China

Extractive metallurgy is the practice of removing valuable metals from an ore and refining the extracted raw metals into a purer form. In order to convert a metal oxide or sulphide to a purer metal, the ore must be reduced physically, chemically, or electrolytically. Extractive metallurgists are interested in three primary streams: feed, concentrate (metal oxide/sulphide) and tailings (waste).

After mining, large pieces of the ore feed are broken through crushing or grinding in order to obtain particles small enough, where each particle is either mostly valuable or mostly waste. Concentrating the particles of value in a form supporting separation enables the desired metal to be removed from waste products.

Mining may not be necessary, if the ore body and physical environment are conducive to leaching. Leaching dissolves minerals in an ore body and results in an enriched solution. The solution is collected and processed to extract valuable metals. Ore bodies often contain more than one valuable metal.

Tailings of a previous process may be used as a feed in another process to extract a secondary product from the original ore. Additionally, a concentrate may contain more than one valuable metal. That concentrate would then be processed to separate the valuable metals into individual constituents.

== Metal and its alloys ==
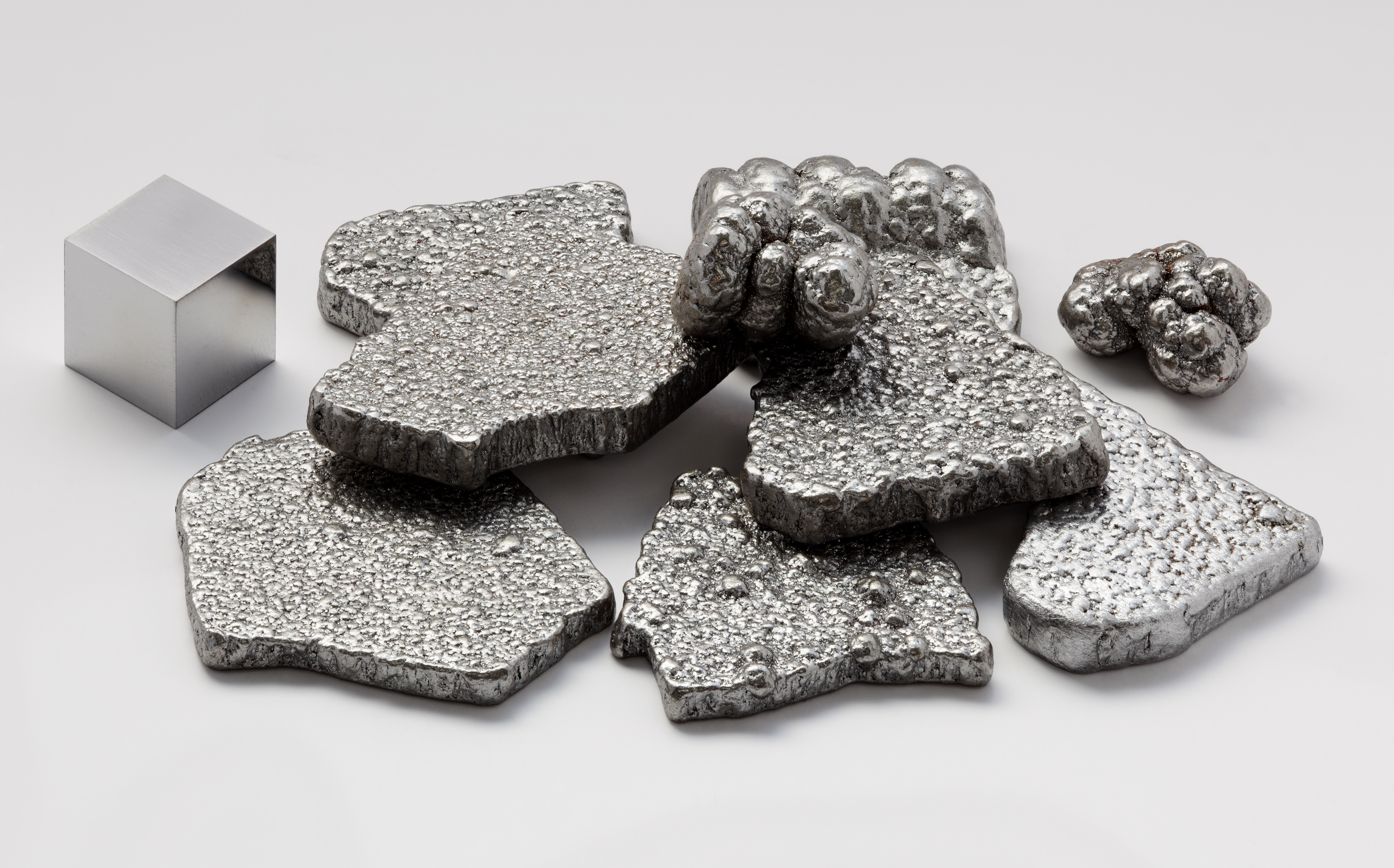
Iron, the most common metal used in metallurgy, is shown in different forms, including cubes, chips, and nuggets

Much effort has been placed on understanding the iron–carbon alloy system, which includes steels and cast irons. Plain carbon steels (those that contain essentially only carbon as an alloying element) are used in low-cost, high-strength applications, where neither weight nor corrosion are a major concern. Cast irons, including ductile iron, are also part of the iron-carbon system. Iron-Manganese-Chromium alloys (Hadfield-type steels) are also used in non-magnetic applications such as directional drilling.

Other engineering metals include aluminium, chromium, copper, magnesium, nickel, titanium, zinc, and silicon. These metals are most often used as alloys with the noted exception of silicon, which is not a metal. Other forms include:

- Stainless steel, particularly Austenitic stainless steels, galvanized steel, nickel alloys, titanium alloys, or occasionally copper alloys are used where resistance to corrosion is important.
- Aluminium alloys and magnesium alloys are commonly used when a lightweight strong part is required such as in automotive and aerospace applications.
- Copper-nickel alloys (such as Monel) are used in highly corrosive environments and for non-magnetic applications.
- Nickel-based superalloys like Inconel are used in high-temperature applications such as gas turbines, turbochargers, pressure vessels, and heat exchangers.
- For extremely high temperatures, single crystal alloys are used to minimize creep. In modern electronics, high purity single crystal silicon is essential for metal-oxide-silicon transistors (MOS) and integrated circuits.

== Production ==
In production engineering, metallurgy is concerned with the production of metallic components for use in consumer or engineering products. This involves production of alloys, shaping, heat treatment and surface treatment of product. The metallurgist's task is to achieve balance between material properties, such as cost, weight, strength, toughness, hardness, corrosion, fatigue resistance and performance in temperature extremes. To achieve this goal, the operating environment must be carefully considered.

Hardness testing (using scales such as Rockwell, Vickers, and Brinell) is a common practice for characterizing a metal's elasticity and plasticity In a saltwater environment, most ferrous metals and some non-ferrous alloys corrode quickly. Metals exposed to cold or cryogenic conditions may undergo a ductile to brittle transition and lose their toughness, becoming more brittle and prone to cracking. Metals under continual cyclic loading can suffer from metal fatigue. Metals under constant stress at elevated temperatures can creep.

=== Metalworking processes ===
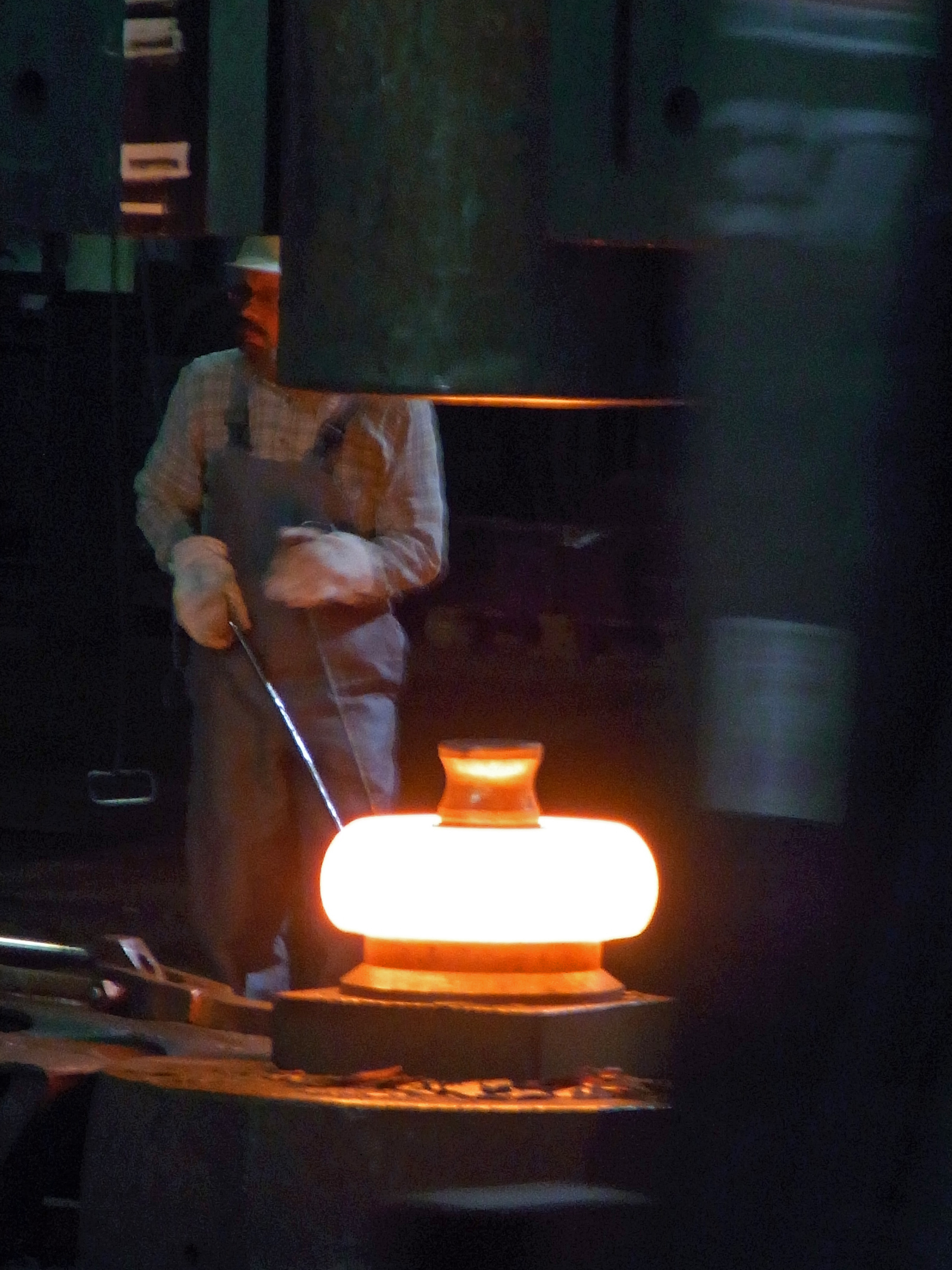
An open-die drop forging with two dies of an ingot, which is then further processed into a wheel

- Casting – molten metal is poured into a shaped mold. Variants of casting include sand casting; investment casting, also called the lost wax process; die casting; centrifugal casting, both vertical and horizontal; and continuous castings. Each of these forms has advantages for certain metals and applications considering factors like magnetism and corrosion.
- Forging – a red-hot billet is hammered into shape.
- Rolling – a billet is passed through successively narrower rollers to create a sheet.
- Extrusion – a hot and malleable metal is forced under pressure through a die, which shapes it before it cools.
- Machining – lathes, milling machines and drills cut the cold metal to shape.
- Sintering – a powdered metal is heated in a non-oxidizing environment after being compressed into a die.
- Fabrication – sheets of metal are cut with guillotines or gas cutters and bent and welded into structural shape.
- Laser cladding – metallic powder is blown through a movable laser beam (e.g. mounted on a NC 5-axis machine). The resulting melted metal reaches a substrate to form a melt pool. By moving the laser head, it is possible to stack the tracks and build up a three-dimensional piece.
- 3D printing – Sintering or melting amorphous powder metal in a 3D space to make any object to shape.

Cold-working processes, in which the product's shape is altered by rolling, fabrication or other processes, while the product is cold, can increase the strength of the product by a process called work hardening. Work hardening creates microscopic defects in the metal, which resist further changes of shape.

=== Heat treatment ===
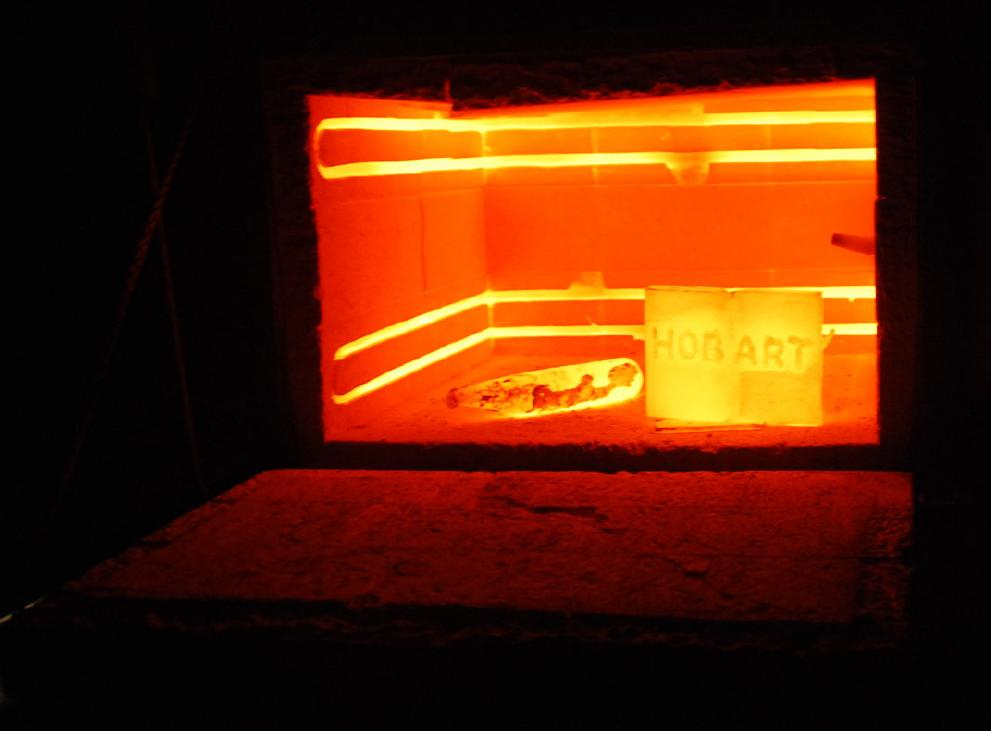
A heat treating furnace at 1,800 °F (980 °C)

Metals can be heat-treated to alter the properties of strength, ductility, toughness, hardness and resistance to corrosion. Common heat treatment processes include annealing, precipitation strengthening, quenching, and tempering:

- Annealing process softens the metal by heating it and then allowing it to cool very slowly, which gets rid of stresses in the metal and makes the grain structure large and soft-edged so that, when the metal is hit or stressed it dents or perhaps bends, rather than breaking; it is also easier to sand, grind, or cut annealed metal.
- Quenching is the process of cooling metal very quickly after heating, thus "freezing" the metal's molecules in the very hard martensite form, which makes the metal harder.
- Tempering relieves stresses in the metal that were caused by the hardening process; tempering makes the metal less hard while making it better able to sustain impacts without breaking.

Often, mechanical and thermal treatments are combined in what are known as thermo-mechanical treatments for better properties and more efficient processing of materials. These processes are common to high-alloy special steels, superalloys and titanium alloys.

=== Plating ===
A simplified diagram of electroplating copper on a metal

Electroplating is a chemical surface-treatment technique. It involves bonding a thin layer of another metal such as gold, silver, chromium or zinc to the surface of the product. This is done by selecting the coating material electrolyte solution, which is the material that is going to coat the workpiece (gold, silver, zinc). There needs to be two electrodes of different materials: one the same material as the coating material and one that is receiving the coating material. Two electrodes are electrically charged and the coating material is stuck to the work piece. It is used to reduce corrosion as well as to improve the product's aesthetic appearance. It is also used to make inexpensive metals look like the more expensive ones (gold, silver).

=== Shot peening ===
Shot peening is a cold working process used to finish metal parts. In the process of shot peening, small round shot is blasted against the surface of the part to be finished. This process is used to prolong the product life of the part, prevent stress corrosion failures, and also prevent fatigue. The shot leaves small dimples on the surface like a peen hammer does, which cause compression stress under the dimple. As the shot media strikes the material over and over, it forms many overlapping dimples throughout the piece being treated. The compression stress in the surface of the material strengthens the part and makes it more resistant to fatigue failure, stress failures, corrosion failure, and cracking.

=== Thermal spraying ===
Thermal spraying techniques are another popular finishing option, and often have better high temperature properties than electroplated coatings. Thermal spraying, also known as a spray welding process, is an industrial coating process that consists of a heat source (flame or other) and a coating material; the coating can be in a powder or wire form, either of which is melted and then sprayed at a high velocity onto the surface of the material being treated. The spray treating process is known by many different names such as HVOF (high velocity oxygen fuel), plasma spray, flame spray, arc spray and metalizing.

=== Electroless deposition ===
Electroless deposition (ED) or electroless plating is defined as the autocatalytic process, through which metals and metal alloys are deposited onto nonconductive surfaces. These nonconductive surfaces include plastics, ceramics, glass, etc., which can then become decorative, anti-corrosive, and conductive, depending on the method of deposition and the designed use. Electroless deposition is a chemical processes that create metal coatings on various materials by autocatalytic chemical reduction of metal cations in a liquid bath.

== Characterization ==
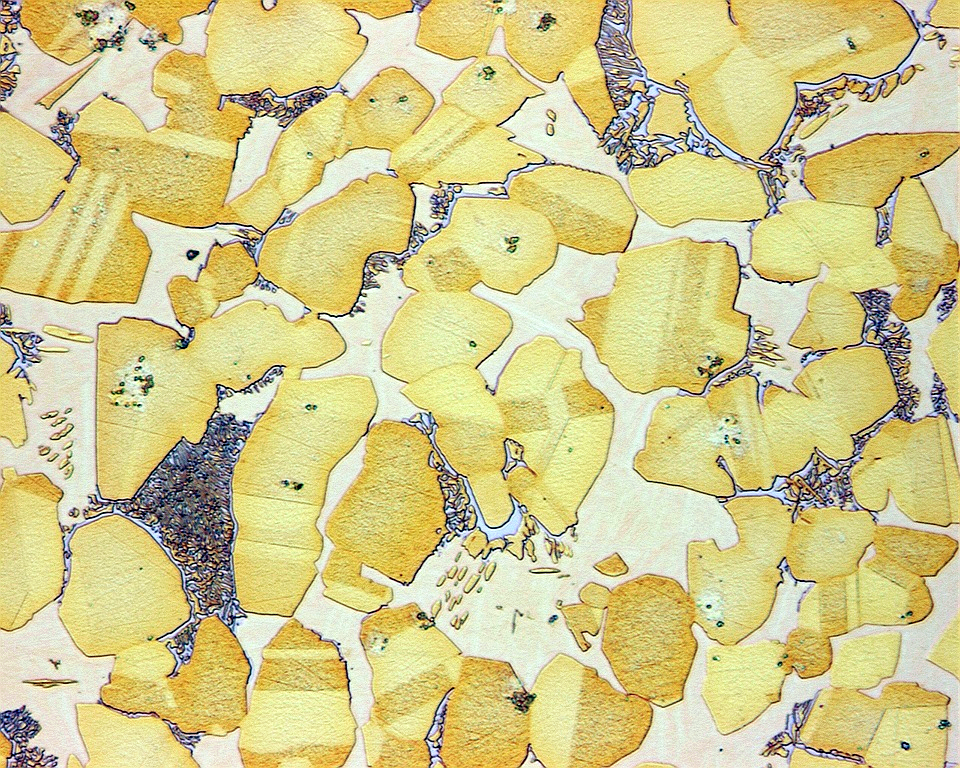
Metallography allows the metallurgist to study the microstructure of metals.

Metallurgists study the microscopic and macroscopic structure of metals using metallography, a technique invented by Henry Clifton Sorby.

In metallography, an alloy of interest is ground flat and polished to a mirror finish. The sample can then be etched to reveal the microstructure and macrostructure of the metal. The sample is then examined in an optical or electron microscope, and the image contrast provides details on the composition, mechanical properties, and processing history.

Crystallography, often using diffraction of X-rays or electrons, is another valuable tool available to the modern metallurgist. Crystallography allows identification of unknown materials and reveals the crystal structure of the sample. Quantitative crystallography can be used to calculate the amount of phases present as well as the degree of strain to which a sample has been subjected.

Current advanced characterization techniques, which are used frequently in this field are: Scanning electron microscopy (SEM), transmission electron microscopy (TEM), electron backscatter diffraction (EBSD) and atom-probe tomography (APT).

== See also ==
- Adrien Chenot
- Archaeometallurgy
- Blacksmith
- CALPHAD
- Carbonyl metallurgy
- Cupellation
- Experimental archaeometallurgy
- Forging
- Goldbeating
- Gold phosphine complex
- Metallurgical failure analysis
- Metalworking
- Mineral industry
- Pyrometallurgy
- Welding
