= Fusion bonded epoxy coating =

Coating used to protect steel from corrosion

Fusion bonded epoxy coating, also known as fusion-bond epoxy powder coating and commonly referred to as FBE coating, is an epoxy-based powder coating that is widely used to protect steel pipe used in pipeline construction from corrosion. It is also commonly used to protect reinforcing bars (though being phased out as of 2005) and on a wide variety of piping connections, valves etc. FBE coatings are thermoset polymer coatings. They come under the category of protective coatings in paints and coating nomenclature. The name fusion-bond epoxy is due to resigning cross-link and the application method, which is different from a conventional paint. In 2020 the market size was quoted at 12 billion dollars.

The resin and hardener components in the dry powder FBE stock remain unreacted at normal storage conditions. At typical coating application temperatures, usually in the range of 180 to 250 °C (356 to 482 °F), the contents of the powder melt and transform to a liquid form. The liquid FBE film wets and flows onto the steel surface on which it is applied, and soon becomes a solid coating by chemical cross-linking, assisted by heat. This process is known as "fusion bonding". The chemical cross-linking reaction taking place in this case is irreversible. Once the curing takes place, the coating cannot be returned to its original form by any means. Application of further heating will not "melt" the coating and thus it is known as a "thermoset" coating.

== History ==
Since their introduction as a protective coating in early 1960s, FBE coating formulations have gone through vast improvements and developments. Today, various types of FBE coatings, tailor-made to meet various requirements, are available. FBEs are available as stand-alone coatings and as a part of multi-layer coatings.

=== Chemistry of FBE coatings ===
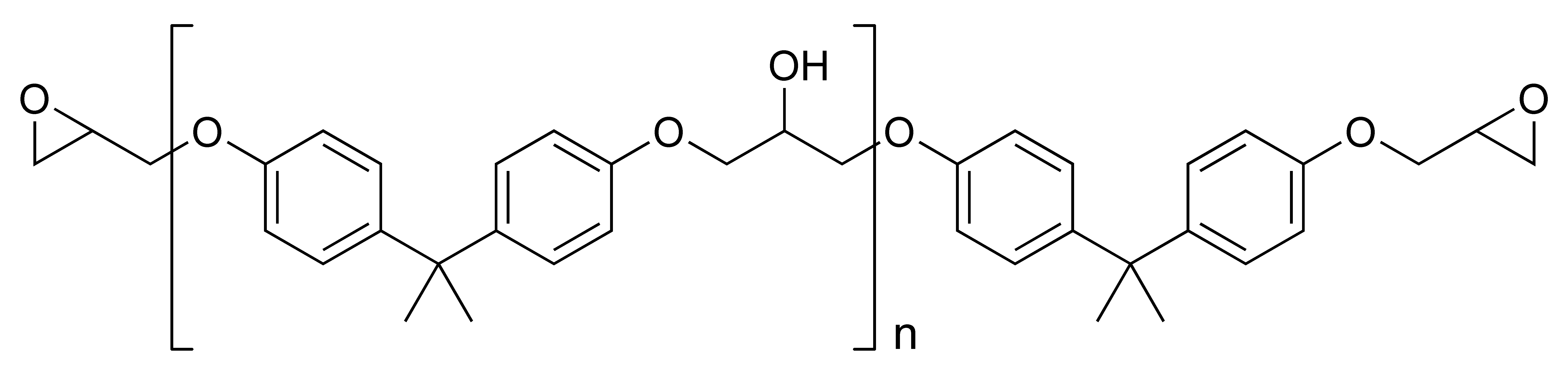
Structure of unmodified Bis phenol A type epoxy prepolymer. n denotes the number of polymerized sub-units and is in the range from 0 to about 25.

Essential components of a powder coating are:

1. Resin
2. Hardener or curing agent
3. Fillers and extenders
4. Colour pigments

The resin and hardener part together is known as the "Binder". As the name indicates, in Fusion bonded epoxy coatings the resin part is an "epoxy" type resin. "Epoxy" or "Oxirane" structure contains a three membered cyclic ring — one oxygen atom connected to two carbon atoms – in the resin molecule. This part is the most reactive group in the epoxy resins. Most commonly used FBE resins are derivatives of bisphenol A and epichlorohydrin. However, other types of resins (for example bisphenol F type) are also commonly used in FBE formulations to achieve various properties, combinations or additions. Resins are also available in various molecular lengths, to provide unique properties to the final coating.

The second most important part of FBE coatings is the curing agent or hardener. Curing agents react either with the epoxy ring or with the hydroxyl groups, along the epoxy molecular chain. Various types of curing agents, used in FBE manufacture, include dicyandiamide, aromatic amines, aliphatic diamines and organic acid anhydrides. The selected curing agent determines the nature of the final FBE product – its cross linking density, chemical resistance, brittleness, flexibility etc. The ratio of epoxy resins and curing agents in a formulation is determined by their relative equivalent weights.

In addition to these two major components, FBE coatings include fillers, pigments, extenders and various additives, to provide desired properties. These components control characteristics such as permeability, hardness, colour, thickness, gouge resistance, etc. All of these components are normally dry solids, even though small quantities of liquid additives may be used in some FBE formulations. If used, these liquid components are sprayed into the formulation mix during pre-blending in the manufacturing process.

The standard for FBE coating of pipelines is ISO 21809 Part 2.

=== FBE powder manufacturing process ===
Essential parts of a powder coating manufacturing plant are:

1. weighting station
2. pre-blending station
3. an extruder
4. a classifier or grinding unit

The components of the FBE formulation are weighed and pre-blended in high-speed mixers. The mix is then transferred to a high-shear extruder. FBE extruders incorporate a single or dual screw setup, rotating within a fixed clamshell barrel. A temperature range from 50 °C to 100 °C is used within the extruder barrel. This setup compresses the FBE blend, while heating and melting it to a semi-liquid form. During this process, the ingredients of the molten mix are dispersed thoroughly. Because of the fast operation of the extruder and relatively low temperature within the barrel, the epoxy and hardener components will not undergo a significant chemical reaction. The molten extrudate then passes between cold-rollers and becomes a solid, brittle sheet. It then moves to a "Kibbler", which chops it into smaller chips. These chips are ground, using high speed grinders (classifiers) to a particle size of less than 150 micrometers (standard specifications requires 100% pass through in 250 micrometer sieves and maximum 3% retains in 150 micrometer sieve). The final product is packaged in closed containers, with particular care given to avoid moisture contamination. Normal storage temperatures of FBE powder coatings are below 25 °C (77 °F) in air-conditioned warehouses.

=== FBE coating application process ===
Regardless of the shape and type of steel surface to be coated, the FBE powder coating application has three essential stages:

1. the steel surface is thoroughly cleaned
2. the cleaned metal part is heated to the recommended FBE powder application temperature
3. the application and curing stage

The advantage of pipe and rebar is that their round shape allows continuous linear application over the exterior surface, while the parts are moved in a conveyor through the powder application booth, ensuring high throughput. On fittings, etc., the coating is applied by manual spray guns. Another method of application is "fluid-dip" process, in which the heated components are dipped in a fluidized powder bed (see below).

==== Surface preparation—blast cleaning ====
Blast cleaning is the most commonly used method for preparation of steel surfaces. This effectively removes rust, scale, slats, etc., from the surface and produces an industrial grade cleaning and a rough surface finish. The roughness of the steel achieved after blasting is referred to as profile, which is measured in micrometers or mils. Commonly used to profile ranges for FBE coatings are 37 to 100 micrometers (1.5 to 4 mils). Profile increases the effective surface area of the steel. The cleanliness achieved is assessed to ISO 8501-1 grades: these originated from a set of photographic slides in a Swedish standard (SIS) showing exemplars of the common terminology of white-metal, near white-metal, etc. Typically, SA 2½ is used for pipelines (equivalent to NACE N°2).

It is important to remove grease or oil contamination prior to blast cleaning. Solvent cleaning, burn-off, etc., are commonly used for this purpose. In the blast cleaning process, compressed air (90 to 110 psi/610 to 760 kPa) is used to force an abrasive onto the surface to be cleaned. Aluminum oxide, steel grit, steel shot, garnet, coal slag, etc., are the frequently used abrasives. Another method of blast cleaning is centrifugal blast cleaning, which is especially used in cleaning the exterior of pipe. In this method, abrasive is thrown to the rotating pipe body, using a specially designed wheel, which is rotated at high speed, while the abrasive is fed from the centre of the wheel.

==== Heating and FBE powder application ====
Heating can be achieved by using several methods, but the most commonly used ones are 'induction heating' or 'oven heating'. The steel part is passed through a high frequency alternating current magnetic field, which heats the metal part to the required FBE coating application temperature. Typical application temperature for a stand-alone FBE is 225 to 245 °C (437 to 473 °F). When used as a primer in a multi-layer polyolefin system, application temperature may be dropped based on FBE manufacturer's recommendations, in order to meet the "inter-coat adhesion" parameters. Special grade FBE coatings which can be applied at temperatures as low as 175 °C (347 °F) has been developed recently by certain FBE powder manufacturers. Other methods of heating are 'oven heating', 'infra-red heating', etc. The FBE powder is placed on a "fluidization bed". In a fluidization bed, the powder particles are suspended in a stream of air, in which the powder will "behave" like a fluid. Once the air supply is turned off, the powder will remain in its original form. The fluidized powder is sprayed onto the hot substrate using suitable spray guns. An electrostatic spray gun incorporates an ionizer electrode on it, which gives the powder particles a positive electric charge. The steel to be coated is "grounded" through the conveyor. The charged powder particles uniformly wraps around the substrate, and melts into a liquid form. Internal surfaces of pipes are coated using spraying lances, which travel from one end to the other end of the heated pipe at a uniform speed, while the pipe is being rotated in its longitudinal axis.

Standard coating thickness range of stand-alone FBE coatings is between 250 and 500 micrometers, even though lower or higher thickness ranges might be specified, depending on service conditions. The molten powder 'flows' into the profile and bonds with the steel. The molten powder will become a solid coating, when the 'gel time' is over, which usually occurs within few seconds after coating application. The resin part of coating will undergo cross-linking, which is known as "curing" under the hot condition. Complete curing is achieved either by the residual heat on the steel, or by the help of additional heating sources. Depending on the FBE coating system, full cure can be achieved in less than one minute to few minutes in case of long cure FBE's, which are used for internal pipe coating applications.

Rebars are coated in a similar manner as coating application, on the exterior of pipes. For FBE coating application on the interior of pipe surface, a lance is used. The lance enters into the pre-heated pipe, and starts spraying the powder from the opposite end, while the pipe is being rotated on its axis and the lance pulls out in a pre-determined speed.

On fittings such as Tee's, elbows, bends, etc., powder can be sprayed using hand-held spray guns. Small sized fittings can also be coated by dipping in a fluidized bed of powder, after heating the steel to the required powder application temperature. After field welding of the pipe ends, FBE can be applied on the weld area as well.

Advantages of FBE application over conventional liquid coating application are:

- Ease of application
- Less waste of material
- Rapid application
- Cure schedules, which means faster production rates

== Failures ==
There are a number of potential failure modes for Fusion bonded epoxy. One of these failure modes is by ultraviolet degradation.

== Manufacturers ==
As of 2021, the world's leading FBE manufacturers were Sherwin-Williams (Valspar), SolEpoxy (former Henkel/Dexter), KCC Corporation, Jotun Powder Coatings, 3M, Axalta Coating Systems, Akzo Nobel, BASF, and Rohm & Haas.

== See also ==
- Cathodic protection – Corrosion prevention technique
- DCVG – Technique for assessing corrosion protection
