= Corrosion Science =

- Discipline: Materials science, corrosion engineering
- Language: English
- Edited by: J.M.C. Mol, O.R. Mattos

Publication details
- History: 1961–present
- Publisher: Elsevier
- Frequency: 18/year
- Impact factor: 7.205 (2020)

Standard abbreviations
- ISO 4: Corros. Sci.

Indexing
- CODEN: CRRSAA
- ISSN: 0010-938X (print); 1879-0496 (web)

Links
- Journal homepage

Corrosion Science is a peer-reviewed scientific journal published by Elsevier in 16 issues per year. Established in 1961, it covers a wide range of topics in the study of pure/applied corrosion and corrosion engineering, including but not limited to oxidation, biochemical corrosion, stress corrosion cracking, and corrosion control methods, as well as surface science and engineering. The editors-in-chief are J.M.C. Mol (Delft University of Technology) and O.R. Mattos (Federal University of Rio de Janeiro).

== Abstracting and indexing ==
The journal is abstracted and indexed in:

- Chemical Abstracts
- Current Contents/Engineering, Computing & Technology
- Inspec
- Materials Science Citation Index
- Scopus

According to the Journal Citation Reports, the journal has a 2020 impact factor of 7.205.
