= Robert E. Pierre =

American journalist

Robert E. Pierre (born 1968 in Franklin, Louisiana) is a longtime reporter and editor at The Washington Post. Pierre has written articles on adult incarceration, juvenile justice and social justice, and he was one of 18 writer-contributors to an award-winning series of articles for The Washington Post, later republished in an anthology as Being a Black Man: At the Corner of Progress and Peril. He and fellow Post writer Jon Jeter are co-authors of A Day Late and a Dollar Short: High Hopes and Deferred Dreams in Obama's "Post-Racial" America.
