= University of Žilina =

Public university in Žilina, Slovakia

- Žilinská univerzita v Žiline
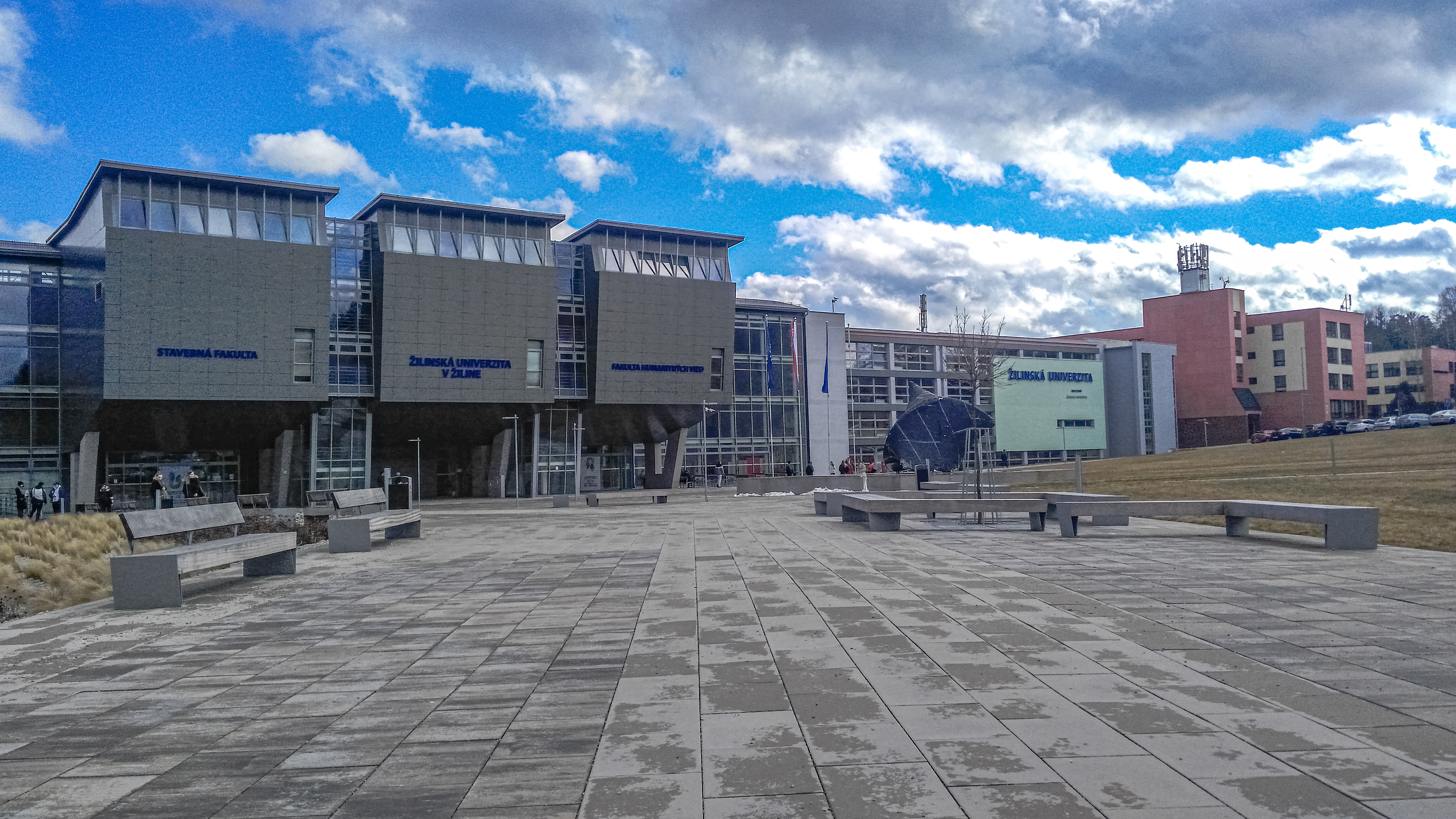
- Main building of the University of Žilina
- Type: Public
- Established: 1953
- Rector: Ján Čelko
- Location: (Slovakia) Žilina, Žilina Region, Slovakia; 49°13′22″N 18°44′24″E
- Website: www.uniza.sk

University rankings

Regional – Overall
- QS Emerging Europe and Central Asia: 168 (2022)

The University of Žilina was established on 1 October 1953 as the College of Railways in Prague. In 1959, the institution changed its name to the University of Transport and moved to Žilina. As a result of the increasing role of communications within the curriculum and research orientation of the university, the name was amended to the University of Transport and Communications in 1980.

It was renamed again to the University of Žilina pursuant to the law passed by the Slovak National Council on 20 November 1996.

The University of Žilina is the only university located in the northwest region of the Slovak Republic. It provides education at all three levels of higher education both in full-time and part-time forms (Bachelor's degree, Engineer/Master's degree and Doctoral degree). All the university's faculties provide a supplementary course of pedagogical studies for students and graduates.

Over the last 57 years, more than 52,000 students have graduated from the university; 1662 of them have been awarded the Ph.D. degree.

The university has established contacts with many universities abroad. Professors and research workers at the university participate in international educational and research projects. These include the European Union projects TEMPUS, COPERNICUS, COST, LLP/ERASMUS, Leonardo da Vinci, than CEEPUS, National Scholarship Programme, DAAD. The academic staff are involved in cooperation within the EU's 6th and 7th Framework programmes.

In March 2024, the University announced that they would be closing the Faculty of Humanities due to financial pressure, affecting up to 500 students.

== Faculties ==
- Faculty of Civil Engineering
- Faculty of Electrical Engineering and Information Technology
- Faculty of Management Science & Informatics
- Faculty of Mechanical Engineering
- Faculty of Operation and Economics of Transport and Communications
- Faculty of Security Engineering
- Faculty of Humanities (liquidated in 2025, except for the Institute of Mediamatics and Cultural Heritage

== Institutes and Centers ==
- Institute of Forensic Engineering
- Institute of Information and Communication Technologies
- Institute of Foreign Languages
- Institute of Physical Education
- CETRA Centre of Transport Research
- Institute of Continuing Education
- Institute of Competitiveness and Innovations
- Institute of High Mountain Biology
- Aviation Training and Educational Centre
- Centre for further Education of Teachers
