= Australasian Corrosion Association =

The Australasian Corrosion Association (ACA) is a non-profit membership association, headquartered in the state of Victoria, Australia and active in the Australasian region (mainly Australia and New Zealand), which disseminates information on corrosion and its prevention or control, by providing training, seminars, conferences, publications and other activities.

The ACA has branches and committees in main centers around Australia and New Zealand.

The ACA has strategic partnerships with the Association for Materials Protection and Performance offering these organizations' training courses in Australasia and Southeast Asia.

The Association proactively promotes corrosion awareness in Australia and New Zealand, and holds annual conferences on the topic.
