= Association for Materials Protection and Performance =

American materials science organization

AMPP: The Association for Materials Protection and Performance
- Predecessor: NACE, SSPC
- Founded: 2021
- Type: Professional Organization
- Purpose: Corrosion Engineering, Protective Coatings
- Location: Houston, Texas, Pittsburgh, Pennsylvania
- Region served: Worldwide
- Method: Standards, Training, Professional Certification, Contractor Accreditation, Conferences, Publications
- Members: 40,000+
- Key people: Alan Thomas, Chief Executive Officer
- Subsidiaries: MPI: Master Painters Institute
- Employees: 200+
- Website: http://www.ampp.org

The Association for Materials Protection and Performance (AMPP), is an American professional association focused on the protection of assets and performance of materials. AMPP was created when NACE International, formerly the National Association of Corrosion Engineers, and the Society for Protective Coatings (SSPC), formerly the Steel Structures Painting Council, merged in 2021. AMPP is active in more than 130 countries and has more than 40,000 members. AMPP is headquartered in the U.S. with offices in Houston, Texas and Pittsburgh, Pennsylvania. Additional offices are located in the UK, China, Malaysia, Brazil, and Saudi Arabia with a training center in Dubai.

== Standards ==
Both the legacy NACE and SSPC organizations were ANSI-accredited standards developers, which AMPP plans to continue. The merged standards program includes 25 standing standards committees that develop technical standards for industries including cathodic protection, coatings, defense, highways and bridges, rail, maritime, oil and gas, power and utilities, research and testing, tanks and pipelines, and water and wastewater.

== Professional training and certifications ==
AMPP offers individual training and certification programs. Many are merged programs that originated as competing programs under the former NACE and SSPC organizations. Other programs are still being administered under the legacy NACE or SSPC frameworks until the merger is complete.

Individual Training and Certification Programs
Category	Programs
Coatings Inspector Program (CIP)	Basic Coatings Inspector; Certified Coatings Inspector; Senior Certified Coatings Inspector
Coatings Applicator Specialist Program (CAS)	Basic Coatings Applicator; Certified Applicator Specialist; SSPC C7 Abrasive Blasting; SSPC C12 Spray Application; SSPC C14 Marine Plural Component
Cathodic Protection	CP1 Cathodic Protection Tester; CP2 Cathodic Protection Technician; CP2 Cathodic Protection Technician - Maritime; CP3 Cathodic Protection Technologist; CP4 Cathodic Protection Specialist
Pipeline	Internal Corrosion Technologist; Pipeline Corrosion Integrity Management (PCIM) Technician; Pipeline Corrosion Integrity Management (PCIM) Technologist; Senior Internal Corrision Technologist
General Corrosion	Refining Corrosion Technologist; Corrosion Technician; Corrosion Technologist; Offshore Corrosion Assessment Training (O-CAT) Technician; Senior Corrosion Technologist
General Coatings	Protective Coating Technician; Shipboard Corrosion Assessment Training (S-CAT) Technician
Speciality Certifications	MR0175 Certified User Carbon Steel (CS) Certification; MR0175 Certified User Corrosion Resistant Alloy (CRA) Certification; Corrosion Specialist; Protective Coating Specialist
Micro-Credentials	Corrosion Foundations; Coatings Foundations for Amusement Parks

== Contractor accreditation ==
AMPP administers accreditation programs for contractors working in the protective coatings and linings industries. "QP" stands for "Qualification Procedure", a reference to the technical standard that underlies each program.

- QP 1, Field Application to Complex Industrial and Marine Structures
- QP 2, Field Removal of Hazardous Coatings
- QP 3, Shop Painting (QP 3 is a joint standard also used by AISC for their sophisticated paint endorsement.)
- QP 5, Coating and Lining Inspection Companies
- QP 6, Metallizing
- QP 7, Painting Contractor Introductory Program
- QP 8, Installation of Polymer Coatings and Surfacings on Concrete and Other Cementitious Surfaces
- QP 9, Commercial Painting and Coating Contractors
- QN 1, Nuclear Coating Supplement
- QS 1, Advanced Quality Management System (ISO 9001-compliant)
