= Galvanic =

Galvanic (after Luigi Galvani) may refer to:

- Galvanic anode
- Galvanic bath
- Galvanic cell
- Galvanic corrosion
- Galvanic current
- Galvanic isolation
- Galvanic potential
- Galvanic series
- Galvanic skin response
- Galvanic vestibular stimulation
- Galvanism
- Galvanization
- Operation Galvanic, World War II attack which included the Battle of Tarawa

== See also ==
- List of forms of electricity named after scientists
