= Galvanize (disambiguation) =

To galvanize a metal object is to subject it to galvanization.

Galvanize may also refer to:

- "Galvanize" (song), by the Chemical Brothers
- Galvanized (album), a 2013 album by The Urge
- Galvanize (software company), Vancouver based software company

== See also ==
- Galvanized Yankee, American Civil War prisoners recruited by their respective captors
- Galvanism, muscular responses to electricity
- Galvanic (disambiguation)
