= Ufer =

Ufer is a surname. Notable people with the surname include:

- Bob Ufer (1920–1981), American track and field athlete and radio broadcaster
- Nils Ufer (1939–1993), Danish journalist and editor
- Walter Ufer (1876–1936), American painter

== See also ==
- Ufer ground
