= Rooster Fighter =

Japanese manga series

- First tankōbon volume cover, featuring Keiji

ニワトリ・ファイター (Niwatori Faitā)
- Genre: Action; Comedy; Parody
- Manga
- Written by: Shū Sakuratani
- Published by: Hero's Inc.
- English publisher: NA: Viz Media
- Magazine: Comiplex
- Original run: December 18, 2020 – present
- Volumes: 13
- Anime television series
- Directed by: Daisuke Suzuki
- Produced by: Joseph Chou
- Written by: Hiroshi Seko
- Music by: Tetsuya Takahashi
- Studio: Sanzigen (animation); Viz Media Hero's (production)
- Licensed by: Viz Media; SA/SEA: Medialink
- Original network: Tokyo MX, Cartoon Network Japan, BS NTV
- English network: US: Adult Swim (Toonami)
- Original run: March 15, 2026 – May 31, 2026 (Note: The anime series was released internationally approximately three weeks ahead of Japan. As such, the original run shown reflects this.)
- Episodes: 12
- icon

Rooster Fighter (Japanese: ニワトリ・ファイター, Hepburn: Niwatori Faitā) is a Japanese web manga series written and illustrated by Shū Sakuratani. It has been serialized on Hero's Inc.'s Comiplex manga website since December 2020. An anime television series adaptation produced by Sanzigen and Viz Media Hero's was released internationally from March to May 2026 before airing in Japan from April to June of the same year.

== Plot ==
Three years ago, mutant demons began appearing in Japan. While some are harmless or helpful towards humans, others are troublesome. Created from humans suffering from extreme emotional distress or unresolved trauma, these mutant demons began to wreak havoc as they began to evolve to be more intelligent and dangerous.

A lone rooster named Keiji wanders around various cities of Japan while defeating mutant demons he encounters. His ultimate goal is to find and kill the mutant dubbed "The White Demon" who killed his sister, Sara, to avenge her death.

== Characters ==
=== Main characters ===
Keiji (ケイジ)
Voiced by: Kenta Miyake (Japanese); Patrick Seitz (English)
A self-described "migratory bird" who vows to defeat the demon that killed his sister. He wanders around Japan and has a policy to never stay longer than necessary. Keiji has a strict code of conduct that he follows regarding respect and appreciation. Despite despising children or any youngsters that he deemed disrespectful or annoying, he has a soft spot for some of them, like Piyoko. His abilities include a powerful Cock-a-doodle-doo that induces resonance and great aim when throwing items with his beak.
Elizabeth (エリザベス, Erizabesu)
Voiced by: Mariko Honda (Japanese); Luci Christian (English)
Adopted into a wealthy family shortly after her birth, Elizabeth is a hen who lived a luxurious yet dissatisfying life when she witnessed a demon wreak havoc on her city and nearly kill her and her family. It was Keiji who rescued them, and she immediately fell in love with him, only to be abandoned right after their short affair. She ended up resenting Keiji for abandoning her and initially trained herself to get revenge against him; however, as she witnessed more mutant demons kill off her loved ones after Keiji's departure, she began training to defeat them for the next six months. After reuniting with Keiji, she decides to join his efforts in fighting against the White Demon. Elizabeth fights with a lightning staff and is shown to be tech-savvy.
Piyoko (ピヨコ)
Voiced by: Shiori Izawa (Japanese); Kimoy Lee (English)
Raised by a yakuza to initially be sold with other chicks, Piyoko became a beloved pet instead before witnessing her owner turn into a mutant demon. Witnessing Keiji defeat and save her owner, she decides to follow him on his journey to defeat the White Demon, and Keiji reluctantly lets her join him after she helped nurse him back to health. She is attached to him, believing that she will marry him once she is older, and was given the name Piyoko by him after asking for a name. She has the word "Duty" (仁義, Jingi) written on her back after asking her former owner to give her a tattoo similar to his. For reasons unknown, Piyoko does not age, as she remains in her chick form after travelling with Keiji and Elizabeth for months.
Morio (モリオ)
Voiced by: Mitsuaki Kanuka (Japanese); Roger Rose (English)
A friendly demon who was manifested by a middle-aged man who was diagnosed with terminal stomach cancer, but was abandoned when his human host learned of his misdiagnosis. After constantly being attacked by locals, Morio shrank to human size and has lived his life as a hermit when he meets and befriends Keiji.
Keisuke (ケイスケ)
Voiced by: Tomohiro Ōno (Japanese); Robbie Daymond (English)
Keiji's younger, crested half-brother who matches him in strength. He joins Keiji on his quest in order to rescue their father after he is captured by demons.

=== Other characters ===
One-Eyed Silver (片目の銀, Katame no Gin)
A one-eyed sea turtle with a personal vendetta against birds after witnessing a flock of gulls eat his siblings after hatching; he is initially hostile towards Keiji. However, he helps him defeat a demon at sea after realizing that Keiji was not like the seagulls he despised. He lets Keiji off to go avenge his sister but makes him promise that they will have a proper battle once he returns.
Zena (ゼナ)
An elderly toucan taken from his home in Brazil and now overseeing the Southern Birds exhibit in the zoo, he took Keiji into the exhibit after finding him unconscious in the rain. He was a beloved member of the community and protected his bird family from a demon attack before succumbing to his injuries. Keiji took one of his feathers, hoping to return it to Zena's sisters one day.
Sara (サラ)
Voiced by: Hikaru Tono (Japanese); Erin Yvette (English)
Sara is the sister of Keiji. It is Sara's death that led Keiji to avenge her; however, Keiji noted that the bird used by the White Demon resembles her.
Gakuma (嶽磨) / White Demon (白鬼獣, Hakkijū)
A white-skinned and four-horned demon. The mutant is responsible for killing Keiji's sister, Sara. Known as the "White Demon", he is a giant that also has a fire-like bird that it uses to burn what it wants. He also has a circular mark on its neck, which Keiji uses to identify it. He is later revealed to be the leader of all demons, and to have the human form of a young man named Gakuma.
Kugone (クゴネ)
Voiced by: Yūko Kaida (Japanese); Anjali Kunapaneni (English)
Gakuma's right-hand woman who is creating demons all over Japan on his orders.
Yuji (裕二, Yūji)
Voiced by: Jun Kasama (Japanese); Alejandro Saab (English)
Hikari (ヒカリ)
Voiced by: Natsumi Fujiwara (Japanese); Zeno Robinson (English)
Keizan (ケイザン)
Voiced by: Akio Otsuka (Japanese); Kirk Thornton (English)
Keiji, Keisuke and Sara's father.

== Media ==
=== Manga ===
Written and illustrated by Shū Sakuratani, Rooster Fighter started on Hero's Inc.'s Comiplex manga website on December 18, 2020. The series' first tankōbon volume was released on May 1, 2021. As of November 5, 2026, 13 volumes have been released.

The manga is licensed in North America by Viz Media, with the first volume released on August 16, 2022.

==== Volumes ====
No.	Original release date	Original ISBN	English release date	English ISBN
1	May 1, 2021	978-4-86468-801-7	August 16, 2022	978-1-9747-2984-5
1. "The Bird Who Fights Demons" (獣聚鳥散, Yūshūchōsan); 2. "Death From a Bird" (雲散鳥没, Unsanchōbotsu); 3. "The Homesick Bird" (越鳥南枝, Enchōnanshin); 4. "The Bird and the Sea Turtle" (窮鳥入懐, Kyūchōnyūkai); 5. "A Bird Leaves the Nest" (四鳥別離, Shichōbetsuri)
2	October 5, 2021	978-4-86468-835-2	November 15, 2022	978-1-9747-3388-0
6. "As Thin as a Bird" (鵠面鳥形, Kokumenchōkei); 7. "The Caged Bird" (籠鳥檻猿, Rōchōkanen); 8. "Birds in Spring" (鳥語花香, Chōgōkakō); 9. "Bird Breath, Bird Vision" (禽息鳥視, Kinsokuchōshi); 10. "The Wounded Bird" (傷弓之鳥, Shōkyūnotori)
3	March 4, 2022	978-4-86468-872-7	February 21, 2023	978-1-9747-3651-5
11. "To Hunt a Bird" (鳥尽弓蔵, Chōjinkyūzō); 12. "Big Bird in a Small Pond" (池魚籠鳥, Chigyorōchō); 13. "Nature's Songbird" (花鳥諷詠, Kachōfūei); 14. "Brave as a Bird" (鳥革翬飛, Chōkakukihi); 15. "The Mountain Bird's Song" (落花啼鳥, Rakkateichō)
4	August 5, 2022	978-4-86468-119-3	August 15, 2023	978-1-9747-3891-5
16. "A Rooster Among Cranes" (群鶏一鶴, Gunkeinoikkaku); 17. "One-Trick Rooster" (鶏鳴狗盗, Keimeikutō); 18. "Scaredy-Bird" (鶏犬不寧, Keikenfunei); 19. "Deadbeat Rooster" (家鶏野鶩, Kakeiyaboku); 20. "My Only Bird" (鶏皮鶴髪, Keihikakuhatu)
5	January 26, 2023	978-4-86468-146-9	December 19, 2023	978-1-9747-4112-0
21. "More Than One Way to Skin a Bird" (割鶏牛刀, Katsukeigyūtō); 22. "Long Live the Hen" (牝鶏牡鳴, Hinkeibomei); 23. "Behind Every Rooster" (鶏鳴之助, Keimeinojyō); 24. "Birds of a Feather Fight Together" (鶏尸牛従, Keishigyōsyō)
6	August 29, 2023	978-4-86468-193-3	June 18, 2024	978-1-9747-4687-3
25. "The View from the Bird Cage" (甕裡醯鶏, Ourikeikei); 26. "The Unfinished Bird" (陶犬瓦鶏, Toukengakei); 27. "To Back a Bird into a Corner" (禽困覆車, Kinkonfukusha); 28. "The Egg Doesn't Fall Far from the Three" (良禽択木, Ryoukintakuboku)
7	January 29, 2024	978-4-86468-229-9	February 18, 2025	978-1-9747-5226-3
29. "What Birds, Beasts, and Trees Share" (禽獣草木, Kinjūsōmoku); 30. "The Beast in Bird's Clothing" (衣冠禽獣, Ikankinjū); 31. "Stay Golden, Pony Bird" (竜駒鳳雛, Tatsukomahōsū); 32. "The Bird's Hidden Potential" (麟子鳳雛, Linkohōsū)
8	August 5, 2024	978-4-86468-274-9	August 19, 2025	978-1-9747-5553-0
33. "Beak Like a Dragon" (麟角鳳嘴, Rinkakuhōsu); 34. "Not Runt in the Flock" (河東三鳳, Kawatōsanpō); 35. "Clutching Chick, Hidden Dragon" (伏竜鳳雛, Fukuryūhōchū); 36. "Grace Under Phoenix Fire" (景星鳳凰, Keiseihōō)
9	January 6, 2025	978-4-86805-028-5	January 20, 2026	978-1-9747-6102-9
37. "The Rooster of Good News" (鳳凰銜書, Hōōkansho); 38. "Feather in the Quiver" (羽翼已成, Uiyokuissei); 39. "Lost in Migration" (鴻雁哀鳴, Kōganainmei); 40. "The Tortoise and the Leopard" (曳尾塗中, Eibitochū); 41. "It's Hard for One Wing to Flap Alone" (孤掌難鳴, Koshōnanmei)
10	July 4, 2025	978-4-86805-083-4	July 21, 2026	978-1-9747-1681-4
42. "Little Feather, Big Wings" (羽翮飛肉, Ugehiniku); 43. "Like Wings on a Tiger" (為虎傅翼, Ikofuyoku); 44. "Keep Your Beak to the Grindstone" (射石飲羽, Shasekiin'u); 45. "The Bird's Lament" (哀鳴啾啾, Aimeshūshū); 46. "Ten Thousand Wings Above the Clouds" (万里鵬翼, Banrihōyoku); 47. "Waiting for the Right Feather" (戢鱗潜翼, Shūrinsenyoku)
11	January 5, 2026	978-4-86805-146-6	February 16, 2027	978-1-9747-6918-6
48. "Under a Father's Wing" (翼覆嫗煦, Tsubasafukuku); 49. "Unhatched Potential" (臥竜鳳雛, Garyōhōsū); 50. "The Quill Is as Mighty as the Sword" (干戚羽旄, Kansekiubou); 51. "Your Reputation Precedes Your Beak" (鶴鳴九皐, Tsurumeikyūsō); 52. "One Harp, One Crane" (一琴一鶴, Ikkonikkaku)
12	April 3, 2026	978-4-86805-174-9	—	—
53. "The Longing Neck of the Crane" (延頸鶴望, Enkeikakumochi); 54. "Crane Over the Country" (懿公喜鶴, Ikōkikitsuru); 55. "Two Wings of the Same Bird" (蛇蚹蜩翼, Jazokuchōyoku); 56. "Can't Hide Your Beak Forever" (蔵頭露尾, Zōtōrotei); 57. "Another Pair of Wings" (傅虎為翼, Fukoiwotsubasa); 58. "How Many Feathers to Sink a Ship?" (積羽沈舟, Sekiuchinshū)
13	November 5, 2026	978-4-86805-241-8	—	—
59. "Honest to Feather" (尾生之信, Bisei no Shin); 60. "Seven Beaks, Eight Tongues" (七嘴八舌, Shichishi wa Chize); 61. "From Head to Tail" (徹頭徹尾, Tettō Tetsubi); 62. "Free from the Shell" (啐啄同時, Sotta Kudōji); 63. "Grand Ambitions" (図南鵬翼, Tonan no Hōyoku)

=== Anime ===
In July 2024 at San Diego Comic-Con, it was announced that the manga would receive an anime television series adaptation in collaboration with Hero's Inc. The series was produced and licensed outside of Asia by Viz Media under the collaborative label Viz Media Hero's, while Sanzigen handled the animation. Sola Entertainment contributed as an associate producer (with the company's CEO, Joseph Chou, serving as its representative). It was directed by Daisuke Suzuki, with Hiroshi Seko handling series composition and music composed by Tetsuya Takahashi. The 12-episode series premiered English dubbed in the United States on Adult Swim's Toonami programming block from March 15 to May 31, 2026, before streaming the same day on Hulu (in the United States) and Disney+ (internationally) shortly after each linear broadcast. The streaming release includes the Japanese subtitled version. It also premiered in Japan on Tokyo MX, Cartoon Network Japan and BS NTV approximately three weeks later from April 6 to June 22, 2026. The opening theme song is "What's a Hero?", performed by Daruma Rollin', while the ending theme song is "We're Loose Stars", performed by Tetsuya Takahashi. Medialink licensed the series in the Asia-Pacific for streaming on Ani-One Asia's YouTube channel and Crunchyroll.

==== Episodes ====
No.	Title	Directed by (Note: Production staff information is taken from the ending credits of each episode.)	Storyboarded by	Animation directed by	English air date (Note: Adult Swim listed the series premiere as airing on March 14 at 24:00, which is effectively March 15 at midnight EDT/PDT.)	Japanese air date (Note: Tokyo MX and Cartoon Network Japan list the series premiere as airing on April 5 at 24:00, which is effectively April 6 at midnight JST.)
1	"A Rooster Among Cranes"; Transliteration: "Gunkeinoikkaku" (Japanese: 群鶏一鶴)	Hajime Yamanokuchi	Daisuke Suzuki	Yusuke Takada, Takuya Chanohara, Joseph Shin, Hasu Nakatani & Yūki Mishima	March 15, 2026	April 6, 2026
A rooster is shown rescuing a boy from a three-headed maternal demon before confronting it head-on. One year earlier, a wandering rooster named Keiji goes off into a suburb shortly after an incident in which his sister, Sara, was eaten by a demon. While fleeing from two boys who planned on feeding him to a cat, Keiji takes refuge at an old man's home. During his stay with the old man, a demon is manifested by a desperate car salesman, and it begins throwing vehicles around a busy street. When the demon is about to kill one of the boys and the old man, Keiji intervenes and battles it. Keiji manages to kill it with his Kokekokko audible attack, which causes the demon's head to explode. After discovering the demon does not bear the tattoo of the one who killed his sister, Keiji helps the old man and the two boys clean up around the neighborhood before leaving the suburb to continue his quest for revenge. Elsewhere, a transvestite demon terrorizes a city before he is defeated by a mysterious hen armed with a conductive ground rod baton.
2	"The Caged Bird"; Transliteration: "Rōchōkanen" (Japanese: 籠鳥檻猿)	Takumi Miyata	Shōko Hayashi	Aki Maeda, Hasu Nakatani & Yūki Mishima	March 22, 2026	April 13, 2026
In Tsurukame, a human named Yasuo Oda attempts to make a living selling chicks. One of them is bullied by the other chicks, but becomes closely attached to Oda. Already owing money to the yakuza, Oda discovers he has an additional debt of 10 million yen after being tricked by a friend into signing a debt transfer contract. The rage stemming from his childhood memories of his mother abandoning him unleashes a demon that begins wreaking havoc on the town. Keiji arrives to confront the demon, but the chick pleads with him not to harm Oda. Despite this, Keiji kills the demon by using Kokekokko. Keiji and the chick discover that Oda is still alive, having been freed from despair in his heart. The chick decides to pursue Keiji after Oda urges her to follow her own path. Later, Keiji eliminates a slug demon but is severely wounded after saving the chick from a surviving piece of the demon. The chick drags Keiji into a back alley and nurses him back to health. A recuperated Keiji allows the chick to tag along for saving him. Suddenly, the duo is ambushed by a hen named Elizabeth, who intends on killing Keiji.
3	"The Parable of the Three Birds"; Transliteration: "Sanchōshumō" (Japanese: 三鳥出網)	Motomu Endo	Daisuke Suzuki & Motomu Endo	Yusuke Takada, Hasu Nakatani, Yūki Mishima & Joseph Shin	March 29, 2026	April 20, 2026
Elizabeth chases down Keiji with her baton, furious that he does not remember her. She reminds Keiji that six months ago, he saved her and the wealthy family that adopted her from a demon before having a one-night stand with her that same night and immediately abandoning her. Feeling a sense of betrayal over it, Elizabeth vowed vengeance on the rooster. During their present-day scuffle, Keiji manages to defuse the situation by kissing Elizabeth before all three birds are forced to retreat into a forest to evade a human police officer. While in the forest, Elizabeth shares information with Keiji regarding the demon who devoured Sara. After watching Elizabeth's cell phone video of the demon spouting out a phoenix-like weapon resembling his sister, Keiji erupts into a fit of rage before asking the two other birds to give him time alone. The next day, the trio of chickens visits an unoccupied hot springs to bathe in. As the trio recoups, Keiji bestows the chick with the name Piyoko and begins to question whether the demon from the video is the same one he is hunting down. As Keiji and Elizabeth converse away from Piyoko, the chick is nabbed by a cat.
4	"Homing in on Desire"; Transliteration: "Kinsokuchōshi" (Japanese: 禽息鳥視)	Daiki Uchida	Shōko Hayashi	Yusuke Takada, Aki Maeda, Hasu Nakatani & Yūki Mishima	April 5, 2026	April 27, 2026
Keiji and Elizabeth pursue the cat that has taken Piyoko, only to discover she is attempting to feed her hungry litter after their owner became obsessed with digging holes. The cat explains that the entire village has fallen into this same strange behavior, while the children have been locked away in a shed. With assistance from the animals, the children escape and reveal that a demon has possessed the adults, forcing them to endlessly dig for something. Though Keiji initially refuses to get involved, he changes his mind when Elizabeth promises to mate with him if he helps defeat the demon. The next morning, one of the children, Sei, confronts the demon, which turns out to be his father, consumed by greed and the desire to find buried treasure. Sei pleads with him to stop, but he refuses, allowing the demon to take control and wreak havoc. Keiji and Elizabeth arrive, managing to defeat the demon without killing Sei's father. Keiji quickly realizes Elizabeth deceived him and lashes out, nearly harming Sei's father before stopping out of pity for his son. Attempting to smooth things over, Keiji charms Elizabeth, but she sees through this and kicks him in the pelvis.
5	"The Motley Flock Scatters"; Transliteration: "Jūshūchōsan" (Japanese: 獣聚鳥散)	Hajime Yamanokuchi	Kenta Sasaki & Kayoko Ezoe	Yusuke Takada, Aki Maeda, Hasu Nakatani & Yūki Mishima	April 12, 2026	May 4, 2026
After going viral from a man catching footage of their last battle, the trio of chickens is forced to evade capture by humans. Elizabeth suggests they lay low, but this idea irritates Keiji as he likes to go wherever, whenever he pleases. Thus, Keiji decides to abandon Elizabeth and Piyoko. While wandering around the local town, Keiji encounters a human-sized demon named Morio inside a casino. Although initially reluctant around the demon, Keiji discovers that Morio is good-willed. The two spend the rest of the day together on the outskirts of town before Keiji departs that evening. Later that night, Elizabeth and Piyoko encounter a young girl outside during a thunderstorm. Worried about their well-being, the girl brings the chickens into her house, where she and her sickly grandfather reside. In the early morning hours, the town's river begins to breach its banks, forcing everyone near the river to seek higher ground. During their retreat, the grandfather's wheelchair gets stuck in a crack. The girl and the pair of chickens manage to successfully pry the wheelchair out and up onto a slope just before floodwaters reach them. Meanwhile, Morio senses that the town's dam is on the verge of collapsing.
6	"Built like a Brick Coop"; Transliteration: "Chōkakukihi" (Japanese: 鳥革翬飛)	Takumi Miyata & Hajime Yamanokuchi	Kenta Sasaki & Kayoko Ezoe	Yūki Mishima & Yusuke Takada	April 19, 2026	May 11, 2026
Elizabeth and Piyoko discover via the humans that the dam is about to fail and to travel to it. Meanwhile, Morio also makes his way towards the dam. When Morio arrives, he attempts to slow down its collapse by using his big demon form to plug up the cracks. Elizabeth and Piyoko arrive shortly thereafter, being tailed by the man who captured the viral footage of them. While livestreaming Morio, the man accidentally falls over the edge of the dam before being rescued by Keiji, who just arrived. Keiji commends Morio for his heroic actions. However, the dam gives way and drags Morio down into its rushing floodwaters. Keiji races down the river and attempts to block the flood with boulders. When that fails, he rushes downstream again and discovers a pinnacle he can use to completely block it off. Using Super Kokekokko, Keiji rips through the base of the pinnacle and makes it fall into the river. Despite it briefly getting lodged in an angled position, Keiji manages to bring it down into the basin. The trio of chickens discovers Morio survived as they depart the town. After they leave, a humanoid female entity approaches Morio and seemingly kills him.
7	"Crowing over a Feather"; Transliteration: "Taizanmeidō" (Japanese: 大山鳴動)	Motomu Endo	Shōko Hayashi	Aki Maeda, Takuya Chanohara & Yūki Mishima	April 26, 2026	May 18, 2026
Keiji is approached by two cock pigeons who ask him to join them on a triple date with hen pigeons. He accepts the invitation, and during the date, Keiji grows irritable when the hens find no attractive qualities in chickens. Frustrated that none of his attempts to win them over work, Keiji disrupts the date and prepares to leave, telling the hens he does not care what they think. This gets the hens to finally find him attractive, until a jealous Elizabeth rats him out as a man-whore and all the pigeons fly away. Some time later, the trio shares a fish meal together. After trying out his portion, Keiji becomes greedy and takes Piyoko's serving when she tells him she is not hungry. Piyoko begins to develop an inferiority complex once she realizes she cannot actually fight demons like Keiji and Elizabeth, attempting to compensate by rescuing a lizard from being bullied by other lizards. This backfires on her when the boss lizard turns into a demon and chases her. After being saved by Keiji and Elizabeth, Piyoko grows more depressed. Suddenly, the trio is approached by a mysterious rooster, who addresses Keiji as his older brother before collapsing.
8	"Not All Feathers Hold A Song"; Transliteration: "Gakeitōken" (Japanese: 瓦鶏陶犬)	Hajime Yamanokuchi	Kenta Sasaki & Kayoko Ezoe	Yusuke Takada, Yūki Mishima & Aki Maeda	May 3, 2026	May 25, 2026
The rooster has his wounds treated by Elizabeth and later awakens, blushing upon seeing her. Elizabeth notices this and attempts to tease him before they are interrupted by Keiji. The rooster reveals himself as Keisuke, Keiji's younger half-brother, a Silkie raised by Keiji's father, Keizan. Keisuke informs Keiji that Keizan was captured and is being held hostage in Akamori City by human-like entities known as devils. Keisuke also reveals that he and Keiji are descendants of the Goshikidori family of chickens, gifted with martial arts abilities so that they may defeat demons. Keisuke asks Keiji to fight alongside him to rescue Keizan. Keiji, however, refuses, explaining that their father abandoned him and his biological mother. Keizan's decision resulted in Keiji's mother's death due to heartbreak, but not before she successfully incubated his younger sister, Sarah. Keisuke brawls with Keiji after he repeatedly slanders Keizan. During their fight, Keisuke effortlessly overpowers Keiji and defeats him. Overnight, as Keiji attempts to humble himself, Elizabeth discovers via her phone that Morio is causing destruction in Akamori City, prompting Keiji and crew to depart immediately. Once there, they disable an active rampaging octopus demon. A lower devil spots them and notifies the upper echelon.
9	"Gone to the Birds"; Transliteration: "Jūteichōseki" (Japanese: 獣蹄鳥跡)	Daiki Uchida	Shōko Hayashi	Yusuke Takada, Yūki Mishima & Joseph Shin	May 10, 2026	June 1, 2026
A parasite escapes from the octopus demon's head and is killed by Keiji. Having regained control, the octopus demon explains that the devils have been going around injecting parasites into demons to personally control them. Elizabeth tells the other chickens to go on ahead without her. Keiji, Piyoko, and Keisuke arrive at the warehouse, where they are greeted by two devils named Hikari and Yuji. After a heated confrontation, the trio of birds is attacked by parasite-controlled demons on Hikari's command. Elizabeth arrives and incapacitates the active demons with an electroshock weapon she requested from her foster father. Hikari activates even stronger demons, one of which is Morio. After unsuccessful attempts to get Morio to regain control, Piyoko instructs Keiji to help her get into his body so she can eliminate the parasite with a nail. With assistance from the octopus demon, Piyoko enters Morio's nostril and wiggles her way into his brain, where the parasite is hiding. After a few unsuccessful attempts from its front, Piyoko attacks the parasite from the back before getting critically stabbed through her torso by one of its tentacles. After Piyoko loses consciousness, a mysterious symbol suddenly appears on her chest and reawakening eyes.
10	"To Back a Bird into a Corner"; Transliteration: "Kinkonfukusha" (Japanese: 禽困覆車)	Motomu Endo	Kenta Sasaki & Kayoko Ezoe	Yūki Mishima, Aki Maeda & Yusuke Takada	May 17, 2026	June 8, 2026
Inside Piyoko's subconscious, the chick begins to suspect she has died. A pair of eyes with the same symbols appear, deducing she does not remember him. The mysterious apparition takes control over Piyoko's body and begins tormenting the parasite. Back outside Morio's body, the rest of the chickens take on Yuji, who has assumed his true form, to launch a barrage of missiles from his weaponized arm at the trio. Yuji quickly runs out of ammo, giving Keiji and Keisuke a chance to strike him. However, Yuji's armor protects him from both of their assaults. After reloading, Yuji launches target-seeking missiles at the chickens, making them run around constantly to evade them. Keiji runs back towards Yuji while using Kokekokko as the missile follows, hitting them both and seemingly killing Keiji. However, it is revealed that Keiji hid inside the weapon's barrel and has thrown deformed metal into it, causing Yuji's entire arm to explode. Keisuke sees an opportunity and kills Yuji as he writhes in pain. Hikari steps in to take on Keisuke as Elizabeth and a severely injured Keiji watch. Despite significantly surpassing his own body's limits to directly strike Hikari, Keisuke fails to even wound the devil.
11	"It Takes Two Wings to Fly"; Transliteration: "Koshōnanmei" (Japanese: 孤掌難鳴)	Hajime Yamanokuchi	Shōko Hayashi, Kenta Sasaki & Kayoko Ezoe	Yusuke Takada & Yūki Mishima	May 24, 2026	June 15, 2026
Hikari begins to dominate in the fight against Keisuke and is about to kill him when Keiji steps back in to stop him. Around the same time, Morio regains control over his body and attempts to combat the devil but quickly gets knocked unconscious. Keisuke questions why Keiji would continue to fight someone he knows he has no chance of beating. Keisuke suddenly realizes that what he himself was missing is perseverance, and overcomes his doubts to awaken his true power as Keiji reaches his physical limits. Before the rematch, a renewed Keisuke instructs Elizabeth to go find Keizan inside the warehouse. The rooster begins turning the tables on Hikari and seemingly kills him. However, the devil regenerates into his true form. Meanwhile, Elizabeth chases after the lower devil who has run off with Keizan. Back near the warehouse, Hikari begins attacking Keisuke with multiple bladed tentacles. While giving the rooster a challenging round of hits to evade, Morio regains consciousness and manages to immobilize the devil. Hikari quickly regains mobility by seemingly killing Morio with his tentacles. Having just witnessed his friend die right in front of him, an enraged Keiji begins to awaken a dormant power from within.
12	"What the Birds, Beasts, and Trees Share"; Transliteration: "Kinjūsōmoku" (Japanese: 禽獣草木)	Motomu Endo & Daisuke Suzuki	Kenta Sasaki & Kayoko Ezoe	Yūki Mishima & Aki Maeda	May 31, 2026	June 22, 2026
Elizabeth successfully rescues Keizan. Back near the warehouse in his awakened state, Keiji maxes out his Kokekokko on the sphere in Hikari's chest, destroying it and incapacitating the devil. Elizabeth returns with an unconscious Keizan. Piyoko eagerly greets Keiji, but the rooster regrettably informs her that Morio is dead. As the chick cries on Morio's head, it is revealed that the demon survived his injuries, deducing that his strong will to survive kept him from dying. As the chickens find relief in his survival, Hikari gets back up. To their astonishment, the devil transforms back into his human form and thanks them before losing consciousness. The group decides to take Hikari with them, and they all fall asleep in a nearby forest. Once they awaken, Hikari reveals that a devil above him named Kugone brainwashed him after he turned into a demon, convincing him that she was his real mother as she transformed him into a devil. He also reveals that another devil exists above her named Gakuma. Keiji discovers this is the white demon he has been after all this time. The chickens and demons depart later that evening, with Keiji determined to track down Gakuma and rescue Sara.

== Reception ==
Since its premiere, Rooster Fighter has been popular abroad, especially in Spanish-speaking countries such as Mexico, Spain, and Argentina, with the manga receiving translation publication offers from more than 12 countries and regions.

Reviewing the first eight volumes of the series, Bolts of Anime News Network found the story predictable and that it does not do anything new, but praised the art and fight choreography, commenting that the series treats itself very seriously in the best way.

In 2026, the anime series was nominated at the 6th Astra TV Awards in the Best Anime Series category, while Patrick Seitz was nominated for Best Lead Voice-Over Performance for his English dub role as Keiji.
