= Anodic protection =

Chemical technique

Anodic protection (AP) otherwise referred to as Anodic Control is a technique to control the corrosion of a metal surface by making it the anode of an electrochemical cell and controlling the electrode potential in a zone where the metal is passive.

Anodic protection is used to protect metals that exhibit passivation in environments whereby the current density in the freely corroding state is significantly higher than the current density in the passive state over a wide range of potentials.

Anodic protection is used for carbon steel storage tanks containing extreme pH environments including concentrated sulfuric acid and 50 percent caustic soda where cathodic protection is not suitable due to very high current requirements.

In anodic protection potentiostat is used to maintain a metal at constant potential with respect to reference electrode. Out of three terminals of the potentiostat one is connected to tank to be protected, another to an auxiliary cathode (platinum) and the third to reference electrode. Thus, a potentiostat maintains a constant potential between tank and reference electrode.

An anodic protection system includes an external power supply connected to auxiliary cathodes and controlled by a feedback signal from one or more reference electrodes. Careful design and control is required when using anodic protection for several reasons, including excessive current when passivation is lost or unstable, leading to possible accelerated corrosion.

== See also ==
- Cathodic protection
- Corrosion engineering
- Sacrificial metal
- Wetting voltage
