= Cathodic modification =

Cathodic modification within chemistry is the retardation of anodic reaction as the result of an increase in the ability of an alloy to be passivated by the introduction of an active cathode into the alloy e.g. the alloying of stainless steel and titanium with platinum group metals ^{(1)}. This is one way in which corrosion resistant alloys can be produced and the resistance of alloy against electrochemical attack increased.

== See also ==
- Cathodic protection
