= Galvanic corrosion =

Electrochemical process

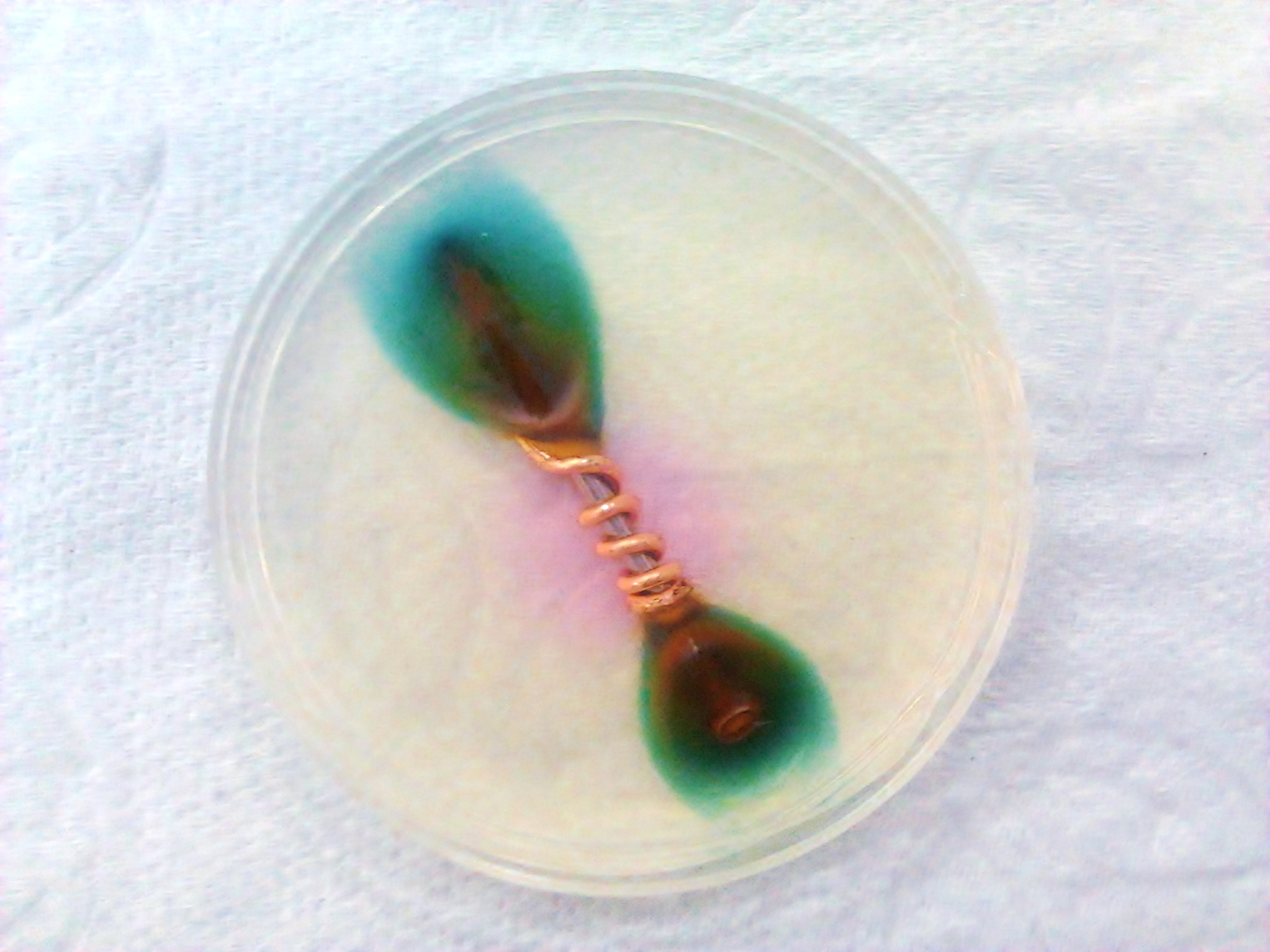
Corrosion of an iron nail wrapped in bright copper wire, showing cathodic protection of copper; a ferroxyl indicator solution shows colored chemical indications of two types of ions diffusing through a moist agar medium.

Galvanic corrosion (also called bimetallic corrosion or dissimilar metal corrosion) is an electrochemical process in which one metal corrodes when it is in electrical contact with another, different metal, and both are in the presence of an electrolyte. A similar galvanic reaction is exploited in single-use battery cells to generate a useful electrical voltage to power portable devices. This phenomenon is named after Italian physician Luigi Galvani (1737–1798).

A similar type of corrosion caused by the presence of an external electric current is called electrolytic corrosion.

== Overview ==
Dissimilar metals and alloys have different electrode potentials, and when two or more come into contact in an electrolyte, one metal (that is more reactive) acts as anode and the other (that is less reactive) as cathode. The electropotential difference between the reactions at the two electrodes is the driving force for an accelerated attack on the anode metal, which dissolves into the electrolyte. This leads to the metal at the anode corroding more quickly than it otherwise would and corrosion at the cathode being inhibited. The presence of an electrolyte and an electrical conducting path between the metals is essential for galvanic corrosion to occur. The electrolyte provides a means for ion migration whereby ions move to prevent charge build-up that would otherwise stop the reaction. If the electrolyte contains only metal ions that are not easily reduced (such as Na^{+}, Ca^{2+}, K^{+}, Mg^{2+}, or Zn^{2+}), the cathode reaction is the reduction of dissolved H^{+} to H_{2} or O_{2} to OH^{−}.

In some cases, this type of reaction is intentionally encouraged. For example, low-cost household batteries typically contain carbon-zinc cells. As part of a closed circuit (the electron pathway), the zinc within the cell will corrode preferentially (the ion pathway) as an essential part of the battery producing electricity. Another example is the cathodic protection of buried or submerged structures as well as hot water storage tanks. In this case, sacrificial anodes work as part of a galvanic couple, promoting corrosion of the anode, while protecting the cathode metal.

In other cases, such as mixed metals in piping (for example, copper, cast iron and other cast metals), galvanic corrosion will contribute to accelerated corrosion of parts of the system. Corrosion inhibitors such as sodium nitrite or sodium molybdate can be injected into these systems to reduce the galvanic potential. However, the application of these corrosion inhibitors must be monitored closely. If the application of corrosion inhibitors increases the conductivity of the water within the system, the galvanic corrosion potential can be greatly increased.

Acidity or alkalinity (pH) is also a major consideration with regard to closed loop bimetallic circulating systems. Should the pH and corrosion inhibition doses be incorrect, galvanic corrosion will be accelerated. In most HVAC systems, the use of sacrificial anodes and cathodes is not an option, as they would need to be applied within the plumbing of the system and, over time, would corrode and release particles that could cause potential mechanical damage to circulating pumps, heat exchangers, etc.

== Examples ==
A common example of galvanic corrosion occurs in galvanized iron, a sheet of iron or steel covered with a zinc coating. Even when the protective zinc coating is broken, the underlying steel is not attacked. Instead, the zinc is corroded because it is less "noble". Only after it has been consumed can rusting of the base metal occur. By contrast, with a conventional tin can, the opposite of a protective effect occurs: because the tin is more noble than the underlying steel, when the tin coating is broken, the steel beneath is immediately attacked preferentially.

=== Statue of Liberty ===
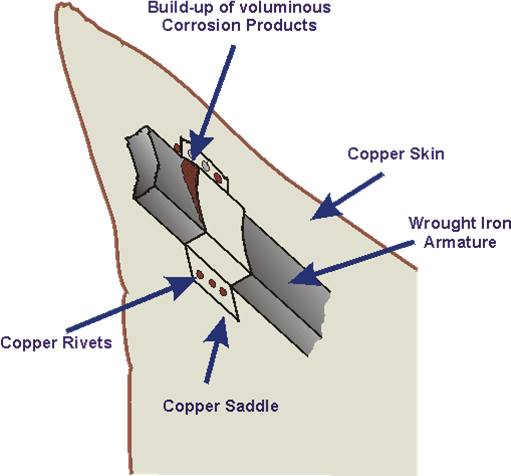
Galvanic corrosion in the Statue of Liberty

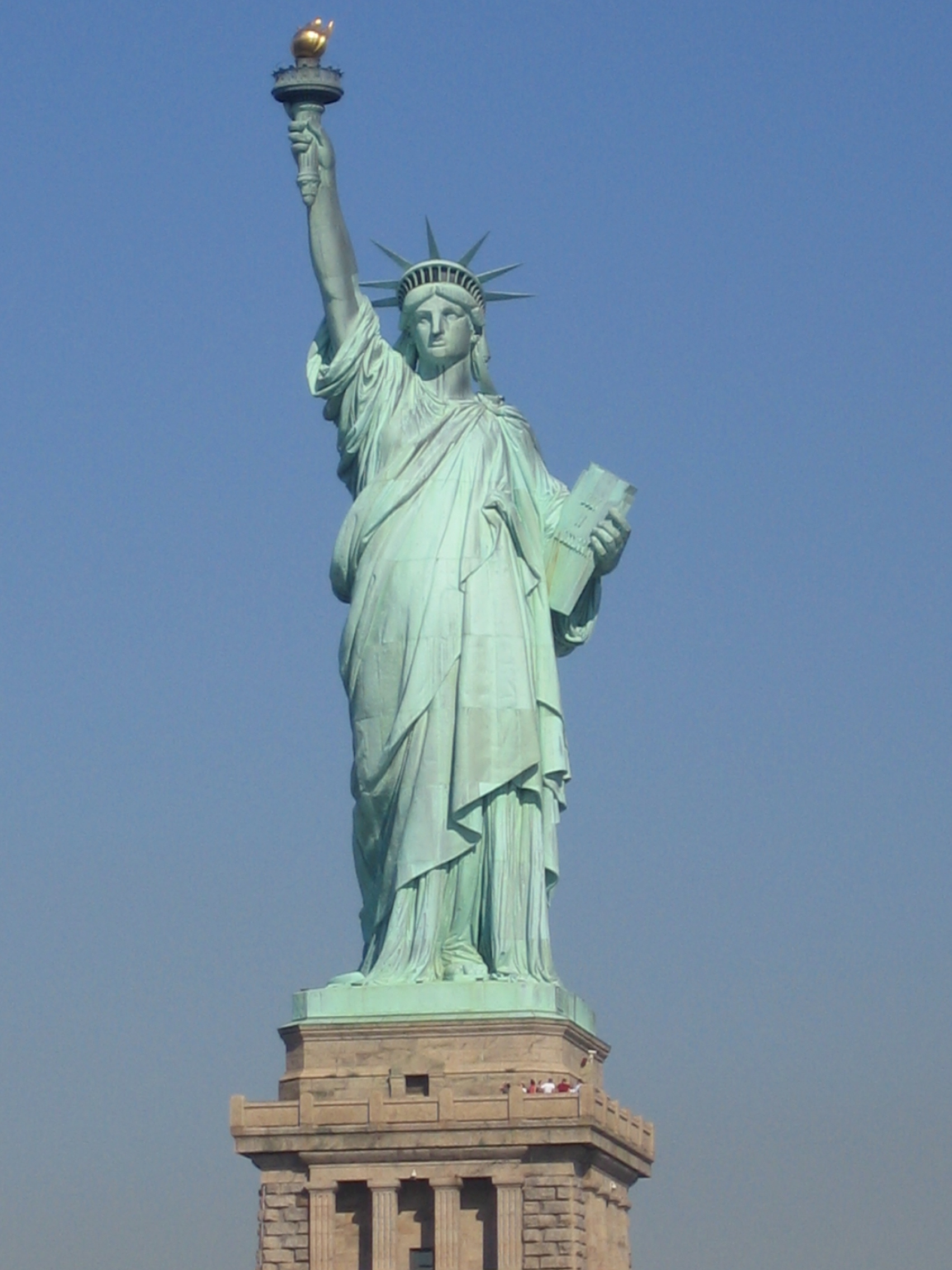
Regular maintenance checks discovered that the Statue of Liberty suffered from galvanic corrosion.

A spectacular example of galvanic corrosion occurred in the Statue of Liberty when regular maintenance checks in the 1980s revealed that corrosion had taken place between the outer copper skin and the wrought iron support structure. Although the problem had been anticipated when the structure was built by Gustave Eiffel to Frédéric Bartholdi's design in the 1880s, the insulation layer of shellac between the two metals had failed over time and resulted in rusting of the iron supports. An extensive renovation was carried out with replacement of the original insulation with PTFE. The structure was far from unsafe owing to the large number of unaffected connections, but it was regarded as a precautionary measure to preserve a national symbol of the United States.

=== Royal Navy and HMS Alarm ===
In 1681, Samuel Pepys (then serving as Admiralty Secretary) agreed to the removal of lead sheathing from English Royal Navy vessels to prevent the mysterious disintegration of their rudder-irons and bolt-heads, though he confessed himself baffled as to the reason the lead caused the corrosion.

The problem recurred when vessels were sheathed in copper to reduce marine weed accumulation and protect against shipworm. In an experiment, the Royal Navy in 1761 had tried fitting the hull of the frigate HMS Alarm with 12-ounce copper plating. Upon her return from a voyage to the West Indies, it was found that although the copper remained in fine condition and had indeed deterred shipworm, it had also become detached from the wooden hull in many places because the iron nails used during its installation "were found dissolved into a kind of rusty Paste". To the surprise of the inspection teams, however, some of the iron nails were virtually undamaged. Closer inspection revealed that water-resistant brown paper trapped under the nail head had inadvertently protected some of the nails: "Where this covering was perfect, the Iron was preserved from Injury". The copper sheathing had been delivered to the dockyard wrapped in the paper which was not always removed before the sheets were nailed to the hull. The conclusion therefore reported to the Admiralty in 1763 was that iron should not be allowed direct contact with copper in sea water.

=== US Navy littoral combat ship Independence ===
Serious galvanic corrosion has been reported on the latest US Navy attack littoral combat vessel the USS Independence caused by steel water jet propulsion systems attached to an aluminium hull. Without electrical isolation between the steel and aluminium, the aluminium hull acts as an anode to the stainless steel, resulting in aggressive galvanic corrosion.

=== Corroding lighting fixtures ===
The unexpected fall in 2011 of a heavy light fixture from the ceiling of the Big Dig vehicular tunnel in Boston revealed that corrosion had weakened its support. Improper use of aluminium in contact with stainless steel had caused rapid corrosion in the presence of salt water. The electrochemical potential difference between stainless steel and aluminium is in the range of 0.5 to 1.0 V, depending on the exact alloys involved, and can cause considerable corrosion within months under unfavorable conditions. Thousands of failing lights would have to be replaced, at an estimated cost of $54 million.

=== Lasagna cell ===
A "lasagna cell" is accidentally produced when salty moist food such as lasagna or sauerkraut is stored in a steel baking pan and is covered with aluminium foil. After a few hours the foil develops small holes where it touches the lasagna, and the food surface becomes covered with small spots composed of corroded aluminium. In this example, the salty food (lasagna) is the electrolyte, the aluminium foil is the anode, and the steel pan is the cathode. If the aluminium foil touches the electrolyte only in small areas, the galvanic corrosion is concentrated, and corrosion can occur fairly rapidly. If the aluminium foil was not used with a dissimilar metal container, the reaction was probably a chemical one. It is possible for heavy concentrations of salt, vinegar or some other acidic compounds to cause the foil to disintegrate. The product of either of these reactions is an aluminium salt. It does not harm the food, but any deposit may impart an undesired flavor and color.

=== Electrolytic cleaning ===
The common technique of cleaning silverware by immersion in a hot electrolytic bath with a piece of aluminium is an example of galvanic corrosion. Aluminium foil is preferred because of its much greater surface area than that of ingots, although if the foil has a "non-stick" face, this must be removed with steel wool first. The electrolytic bath is usually composed of water and sodium bicarbonate, i.e., household baking soda.

Silver darkens and corrodes in the presence of airborne sulfur molecules, and the copper in sterling silver corrodes under a variety of conditions. These layers of corrosion can be largely removed through the electrochemical reduction of silver sulfide molecules: the presence of aluminium (which is less noble than either silver or copper) in the bath of sodium bicarbonate strips the sulfur atoms off the silver sulfide and transfers them onto and thereby corrodes the piece of aluminium (a much more reactive metal), leaving elemental silver behind. No silver is lost in the process.

== Prevention ==
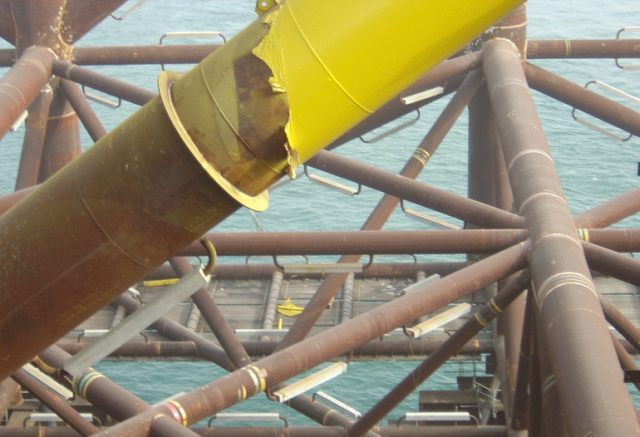
Aluminium anodes mounted on a steel-jacketed structure

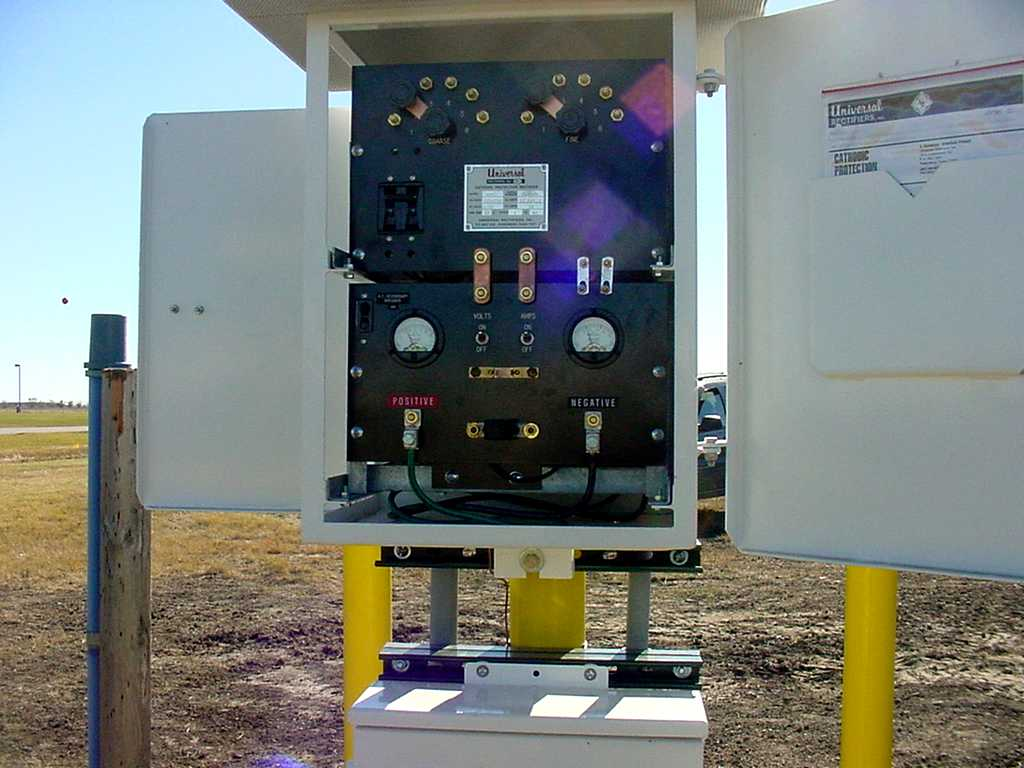
Electrical panel for a cathodic protection system

There are several ways of reducing and preventing this form of corrosion:

- Electrically insulate the two metals from each other. If they are not in electrical contact, no galvanic coupling will occur. This can be achieved by using non-conductive materials between metals of different electropotential. Piping can be isolated with a spool of pipe made of plastic materials, or made of metal material internally coated or lined. It is important that the spool be a sufficient length to be effective. For reasons of safety, this should not be attempted where an electrical earthing system uses the pipework for its ground or has equipotential bonding.
- Metal boats connected to a shore line electrical power feed will normally have to have the hull connected to earth for safety reasons. However the end of that earth connection is likely to be a copper rod buried within the marina, resulting in a steel-copper "battery" of about 0.5 V. Additionally, the hull of each boat is connected to the hull of all other boats, resulting in further "batteries" between propellers (which may be made of bronze) and steel hulls, which may cause corrosion of the expensive propellers. For such cases, the use of a galvanic isolator is essential, typically two semiconductor diodes in series, in parallel with two diodes conducting in the opposite direction (antiparallel). This device is inserted in the protective earth connection between the hull and the shoreline protective conductor. This prevents any current in the protective conductor while the applied voltage is less than 1.4 V (i.e. 0.7 V per diode), but allows a full current in the case of an electrical fault. There will still be a very minor leakage of current through the diodes, which may result in slightly faster corrosion than normal.
- Ensure there is no contact with an electrolyte. This can be done by using water-repellent compounds such as greases, or by coating the metals with an impermeable protective layer, such as a suitable paint, varnish, or plastic. If it is not possible to coat both, the coating should be applied to the more noble, the material with higher potential. This is advisable because if the coating is applied only on the more active material, in case of damage to the coating there will be a large cathode area and a very small anode area, and for the exposed anodic area the corrosion rate will be correspondingly high.
- Using antioxidant paste is beneficial for preventing corrosion between copper and aluminium electrical connections. The paste consists of a lower nobility metal than aluminium or copper.
- Choose metals that have similar electropotentials. The more closely matched the individual potentials, the smaller the potential difference and hence the smaller the galvanic current. Using the same metal for all construction is the easiest way of matching potentials.
- Electroplating or other plating can also help. This tends to use more noble metals that resist corrosion better. Chrome, nickel, silver and gold can all be used. Galvanizing with zinc protects the steel base metal by sacrificial anodic action.
- Cathodic protection uses one or more sacrificial anodes made of a metal which is more active than the protected metal. Alloys of metals commonly used for sacrificial anodes include zinc, magnesium, and aluminium. This approach is commonplace in water heaters and many buried or immersed metallic structures.
- Cathodic protection can also be applied by connecting a direct current (DC) electrical power supply to oppose the corrosive galvanic current. (See Cathodic protection § Impressed current cathodic protection (ICCP).)

== Galvanic series ==
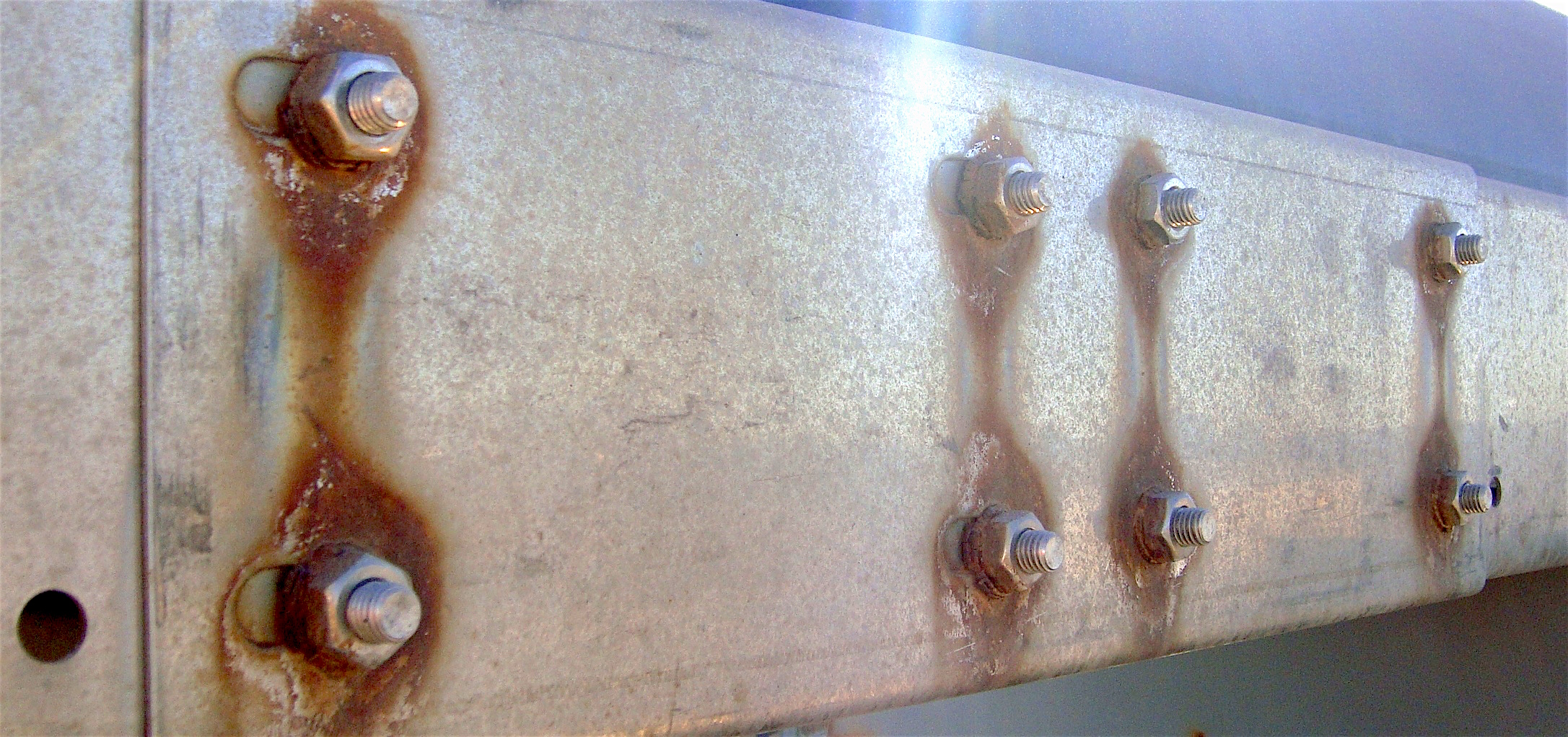
Galvanized mild steel cable ladder with corrosion around stainless steel bolts

All metals can be classified into a galvanic series representing the electrical potential they develop in a given electrolyte against a standard reference electrode. The relative position of two metals on such a series gives a good indication of which metal is more likely to corrode more quickly. However, other factors such as water aeration and flow rate can influence the rate of the process markedly.

== Anodic index ==
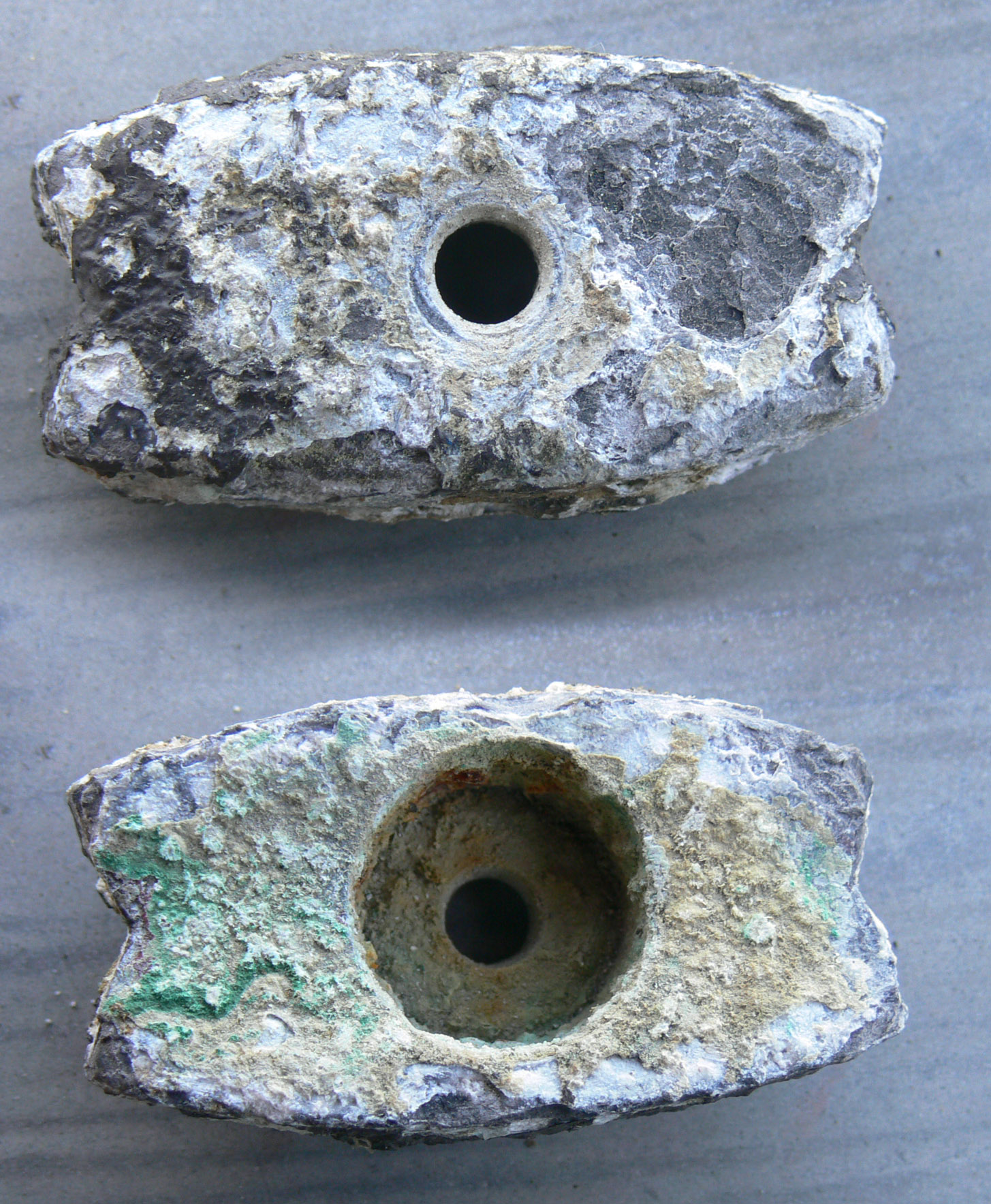
Sacrificial anodes to protect a boat

The compatibility of two different metals may be predicted by consideration of their anodic index. This parameter is a measure of the electrochemical voltage that will be developed between the metal and gold. To find the relative voltage of a pair of metals it is only required to subtract their anodic indices.

To reduce galvanic corrosion for metals stored in normal environments such as storage in warehouses or non-temperature and humidity controlled environments, there should not be more than 0.25 V difference in the anodic index of the two metals in contact. For controlled environments in which temperature and humidity are controlled, 0.50 V can be tolerated. For harsh environments such as outdoors, high humidity, and salty environments, there should be not more than 0.15 V difference in the anodic index. For example: gold and silver have a difference of 0.15 V, therefore the two metals will not experience significant corrosion even in a harsh environment.

When design considerations require that dissimilar metals come in contact, the difference in anodic index is often managed by finishes and plating. The finishing and plating selected allow the dissimilar materials to be in contact, while protecting the more base materials from corrosion by the more noble. It will always be the metal with the most negative anodic index which will ultimately suffer from corrosion when galvanic incompatibility is in play. This is why sterling silver and stainless steel tableware should never be placed together in a dishwasher at the same time, as the steel items will likely experience corrosion by the end of the cycle (soap and water having served as the chemical electrolyte, and heat having accelerated the process).

Anodic index
Metal	Index (V)
Most cathodic	
Gold, solid and plated; gold-platinum alloy	−0.00
Rhodium-plated on silver-plated copper	−0.05
Silver, solid or plated; monel metal; high nickel-copper alloys	−0.15
Nickel, solid or plated; titanium and its alloys; monel	−0.30
Copper, solid or plated; low brasses or bronzes; silver solder; German silvery high copper-nickel alloys; nickel-chromium alloys	−0.35
Brass and bronzes	−0.40
High brasses and bronzes	−0.45
18%-chromium-type corrosion-resistant steels	−0.50
Chromium plated; tin plated; 12%-chromium-type corrosion-resistant steels	−0.60
Tin-plate; tin-lead solder	−0.65
Lead, solid or plated; high lead alloys	−0.70
2000 series wrought aluminium	−0.75
Iron, wrought, gray, or malleable; low alloy and plain carbon steels	−0.85
Aluminium, wrought alloys other than 2000 series aluminium, cast alloys of the silicon type	−0.90
Aluminium, cast alloys (other than silicon type); cadmium, plated and chromate	−0.95
Hot-dip-zinc plate; galvanized steel	−1.20
Zinc, wrought; zinc-base die-casting alloys; zinc plated	−1.25
Magnesium and magnesium-base alloys; cast or wrought	−1.75
Beryllium	−1.85
Most anodic	

== Electrolytic corrosion ==
The term "electrolytic corrosion" is most frequently used to indicate corrosion caused by electric current applied to the metal from external sources. The mechanism of this corrosion is essentially the same as for the galvanic corrosion.

== See also ==
- Corrosion
- Galvanic anode
- Galvanic isolation in electrical/electronic circuits
- Galvanic series
- Galvanization
- Pourbaix diagram – Plot of thermodynamically stable phases of an aqueous electrochemical system

== Sources ==
- McCollum, B.; Logan, K.H. (1913). Electrolytic Corrosion of Iron in Soils. Technologic papers of the Bureau of Standards. U.S. Government Printing Office.
