= Sacrificial metal =

Metal used as a Galvanic anode in cathodic protection

A sacrificial metal is a metal used as a sacrificial anode in cathodic protection that corrodes to prevent a primary metal from corrosion or rusting. It may also be used for galvanization.

== Equation ==
When two metals touch each other and water is present, electrolysis occurs. One well known example is the reaction between zinc (Zn) and iron (Fe). Zinc atoms will lose electrons in preference to the iron as they are more electropositive and therefore zinc is oxidized and corrodes.

Zn(s)→Zn^{2+}(aq) +2e (oxidation)

== Capacity derivation from 1st Principles ==
The capacity of a sacrificial metal may be calculated from first principle as follows:

- 1 kg Al = 1000/27 moles Al
- 1 kg Al = 3 × 1000/27 moles of electrons
- 1 kg Al = 3 × 1000/27 × 96494 coulombs of charge (by Faraday principles)
- = 10.72 × 10^{6} Amp.seconds of charge per Kg Al (1 Coulomb = 1 Amp.Second)
- = 10.72 × 10^{6}/3600 = 2978 Amp.Hours per Kg

By similar calculations Zinc and Magnesium have a capacity of 825 and 2206 Amp.Hours per Kg respectively.

== Uses ==
Sacrificial metals are widely used to prevent other metals from corroding: for example in galvanised steel. Many steel objects are coated with a layer of zinc, which is more electronegative than iron, and thus oxidises in preference to the iron, preventing the iron from rusting. Similarly, sacrificial bars of a metal such as aluminium or aluminium alloys can be attached to an oil rig or to the hull of a ship to prevent it from rusting and breaking down. Magnesium may similarly be used on dry land for installations such as pipelines and oil refineries, where its high driving voltage is better for overcoming the resistance of soils found on dry land.

== See also ==
- Metal in electrochemical series
- Corrosion engineering
