= Galvanic anode =

Main component of cathodic protection

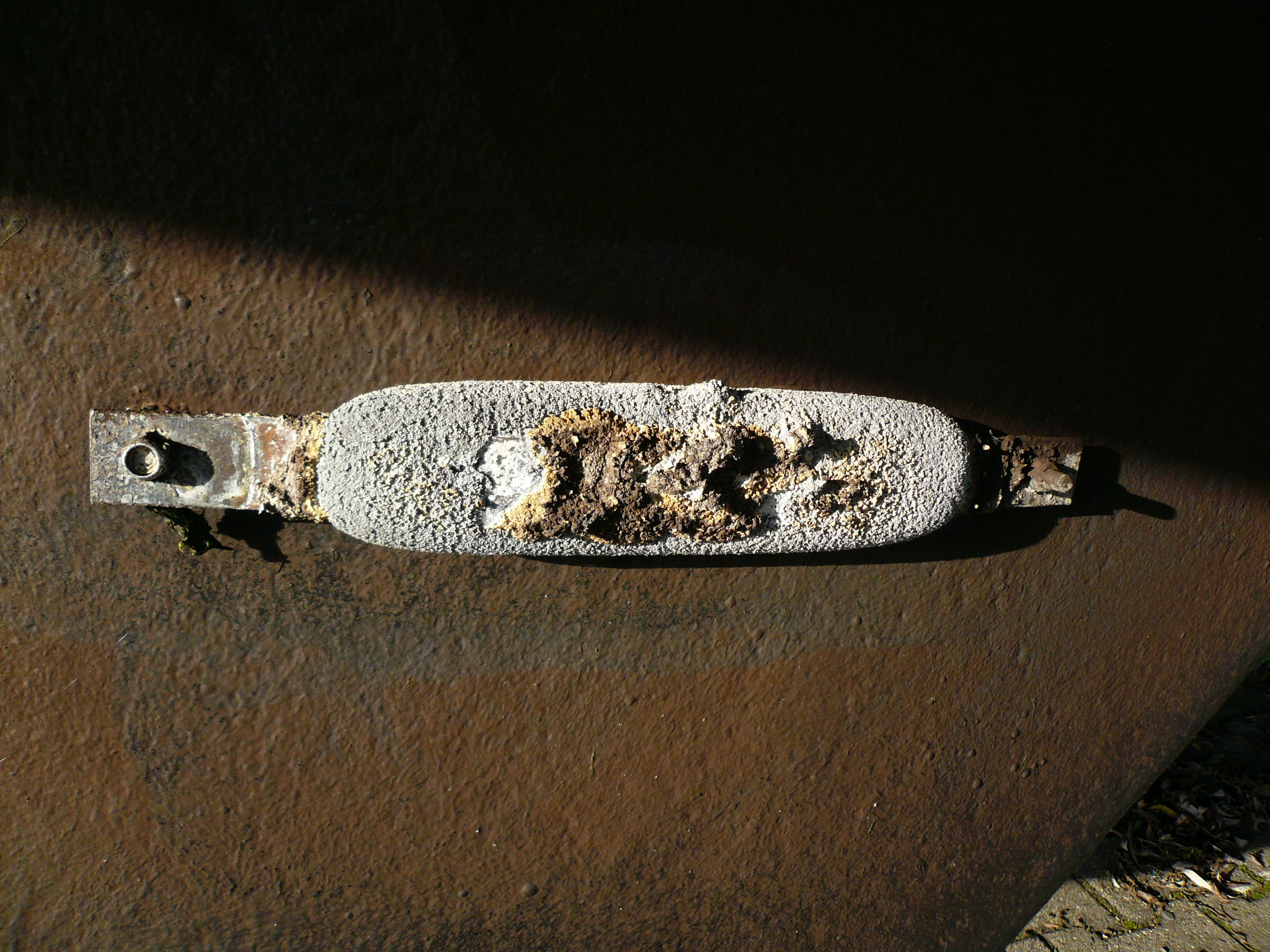
Detailed view of a galvanic anode on the hull of a ship

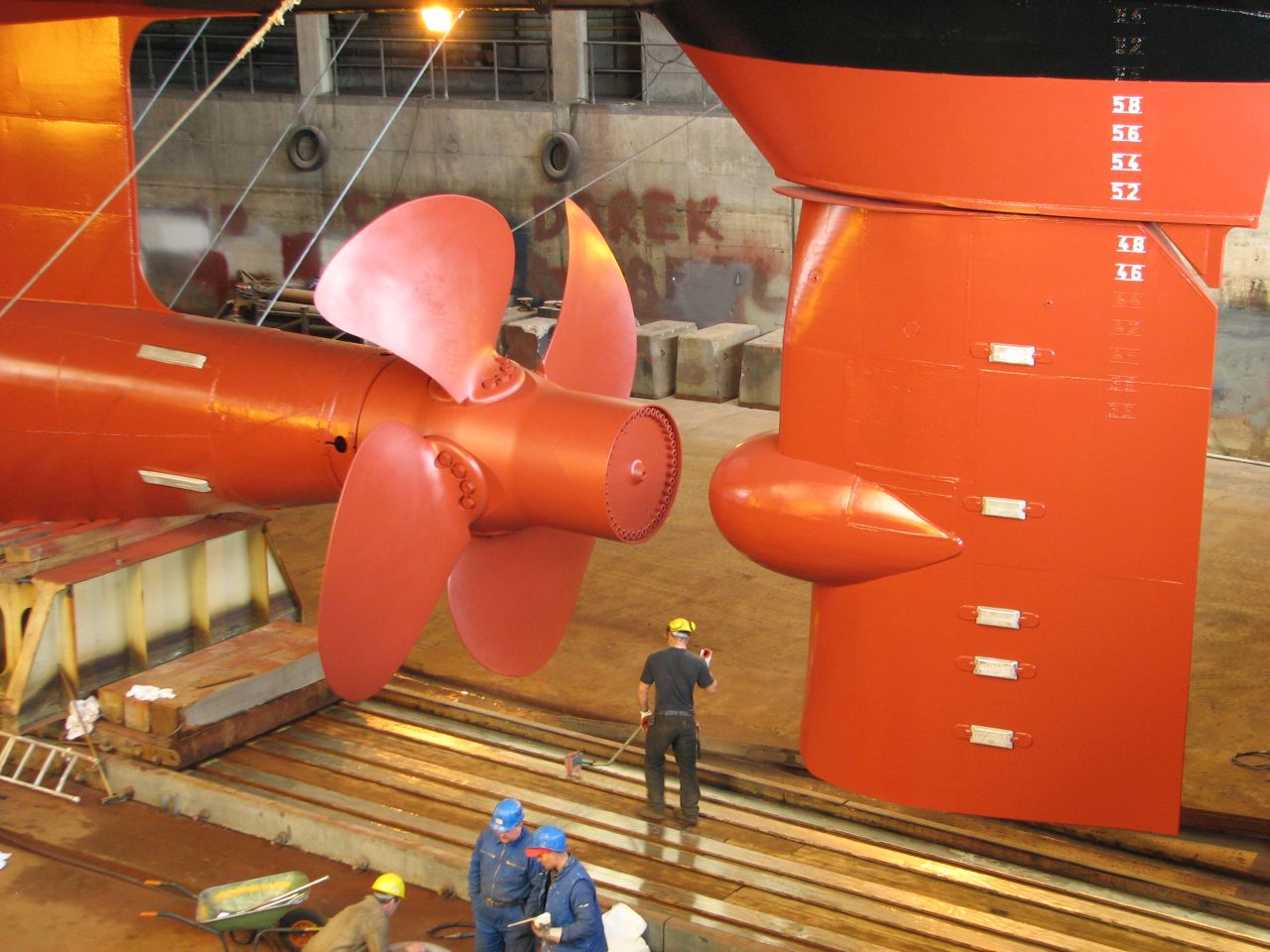
The bright rectangular objects on these ship components are galvanic anodes.

A galvanic anode, or sacrificial anode, is the main component of a galvanic cathodic protection system used to protect buried or submerged metal structures from corrosion.

They are made from a metal alloy with a more "active" voltage (more negative reduction potential / more positive oxidation potential) than the metal of the structure. The difference in potential between the two metals means that the galvanic anode corrodes, in effect being "sacrificed" in order to protect the structure.

== Theory ==
In brief, corrosion is a chemical reaction occurring by an electrochemical mechanism (a redox reaction). During corrosion of iron or steel there are two reactions, oxidation (equation 1), where electrons leave the metal (and the metal dissolves, i.e. actual loss of metal results) and reduction, where the electrons are used to convert oxygen and water to hydroxide ions (equation 2):

$\ce{Fe -> Fe^2+(aq) + 2e-}$	1

$\ce{O2 + 2 H2O + 4e- -> 4 OH- (aq)}$	2

In most environments, the hydroxide ions and ferrous ions combine to form ferrous hydroxide, which eventually becomes the familiar brown rust:

$\ce{Fe^2+(aq) + 2OH- (aq) -> Fe(OH)2(s)}$	3

As corrosion takes place, oxidation and reduction reactions occur and electrochemical cells are formed on the surface of the metal so that some areas will become anodic (oxidation) and some cathodic (reduction). Electrons flow from the anodic areas into the electrolyte as the metal corrodes. Conversely, as electrons flow from the electrolyte to the cathodic areas, the rate of corrosion is reduced. (The flow of electrons is in the opposite direction of the flow of electric current.)

Corrosion can occur in several forms, but in its simplest form it proceeds like this: As the metal continues to corrode, the local potentials on the surface of the metal will change and the anodic and cathodic areas will change and move. As a result, in ferrous metals, a general covering of rust is formed over the whole surface, which will eventually consume all the metal.

Prevention of corrosion by cathodic protection (CP) works by introducing another metal (the galvanic anode) with a much more anodic surface, so that all the current will flow from the introduced anode and the metal to be protected becomes cathodic in comparison to the anode. Oxidation reactions on the main metal surface remain possible, but release less energy, take more activation energy, or both, and so are drastically disfavored, the free electrons much more likely to take the 'easy' path through the galvanic anode. This effectively stops the oxidation on the protected structural surface by transferring it to the anode, which will be sacrificed over time. This takes advantage of the relatively low stability of magnesium, aluminum or zinc metals; they dissolve instead of iron because their bonding is weaker compared to iron, which is bonded strongly via its partially filled d-orbitals.

For this protection to work there must be an electron pathway between the anode and the metal to be protected (e.g., a wire or direct contact) and an ion pathway between both the oxidizing agent (e.g., oxygen and water or moist soil) and the anode, and the oxidizing agent and the metal to be protected, thus forming a closed circuit; therefore simply bolting a piece of active metal such as zinc to a less active metal, such as mild steel, in air (a poor ionic conductor) will not furnish any protection.

== Anode materials ==
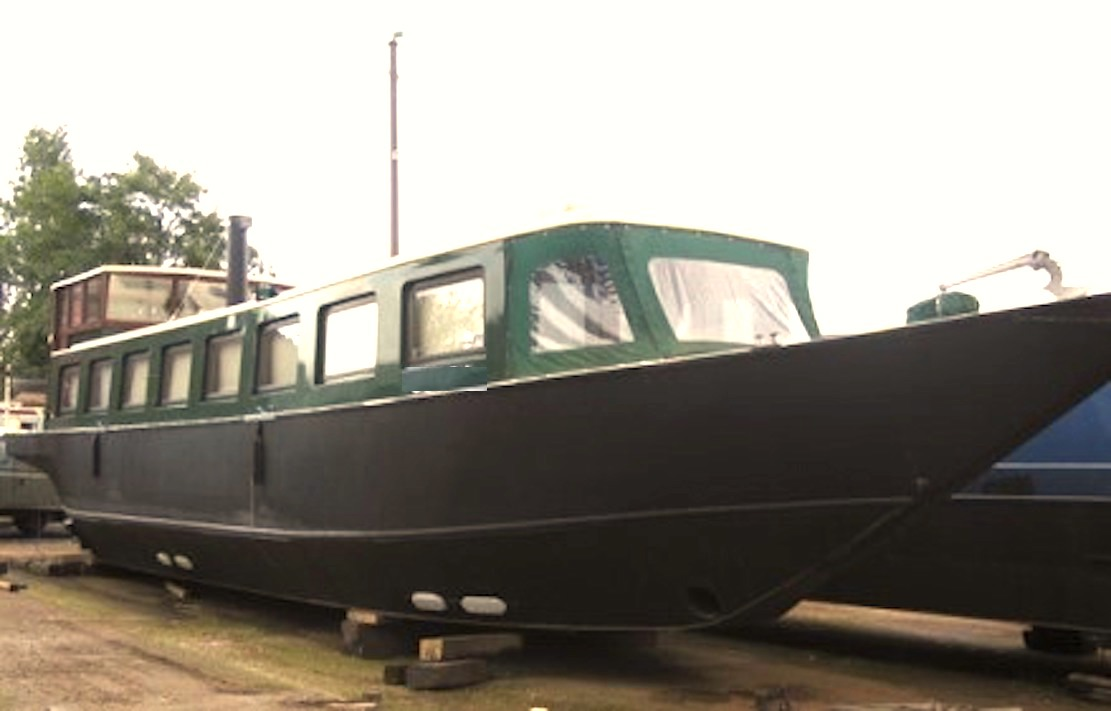
A steel wide-beam canal barge, showing a newly blacked hull and new magnesium anodes.

There are three main metals used as galvanic anodes: magnesium, aluminum and zinc. They are all available as blocks, rods, plates or extruded ribbon. Each material has advantages and disadvantages.

Magnesium has the most negative electropotential of the three (see galvanic series) and is more suitable for areas where the electrolyte (soil or water) resistivity is higher. This is usually on-shore pipelines and other buried structures, although it is also used on boats in fresh water and in water heaters. In some cases, the negative potential of magnesium can be a disadvantage: if the potential of the protected metal becomes too negative, reduction of water or solvated protons may evolve hydrogen atoms on the cathode surface, for instance according to

$\ce{2 H2O + 2e- -> 2H + 2OH- (aq)}$	4

leading to hydrogen embrittlement or to disbonding of the coating. Where this is a concern, zinc anodes may be used. An aluminum-zinc-tin alloy called KA90 is commonly used in marine and water heater applications.

Zinc and aluminium are generally used in salt water, where the resistivity is generally lower and magnesium dissolves relatively quickly by reaction with water under hydrogen evolution (self-corrosion). Typical uses are for the hulls of ships and boats, offshore pipelines and production platforms, in salt-water-cooled marine engines, on small boat propellers and rudders, and for the internal surface of storage tanks.

Zinc is considered a reliable material, but is not suitable for use at higher temperatures, as it tends to passivate (the oxide layer formed shields from further oxidation); if this happens, current may cease to flow and the anode stops working. Zinc has a relatively low driving voltage, which means in higher-resistivity soils or water it may not be able to provide sufficient current. However, in some circumstances — where there is a risk of hydrogen embrittlement, for example — this lower voltage is advantageous, as overprotection is avoided.

Aluminium anodes have several advantages, such as a lighter weight, and much higher capacity than zinc. However, their electrochemical behavior is not considered as reliable as zinc, and greater care must be taken in how they are used. Aluminium anodes will passivate where chloride concentration is below 1,446 parts per million.

One disadvantage of aluminium is that if it strikes a rusty surface, a large thermite spark may be generated, so its use is restricted in tanks where there may be explosive atmospheres and there is a risk of the anode falling.

Since the operation of a galvanic anode relies on the difference in electropotential between the anode and the cathode, practically any metal can be used to protect some other, providing there is a sufficient difference in potential. For example, iron anodes can be used to protect copper.

== Design considerations ==
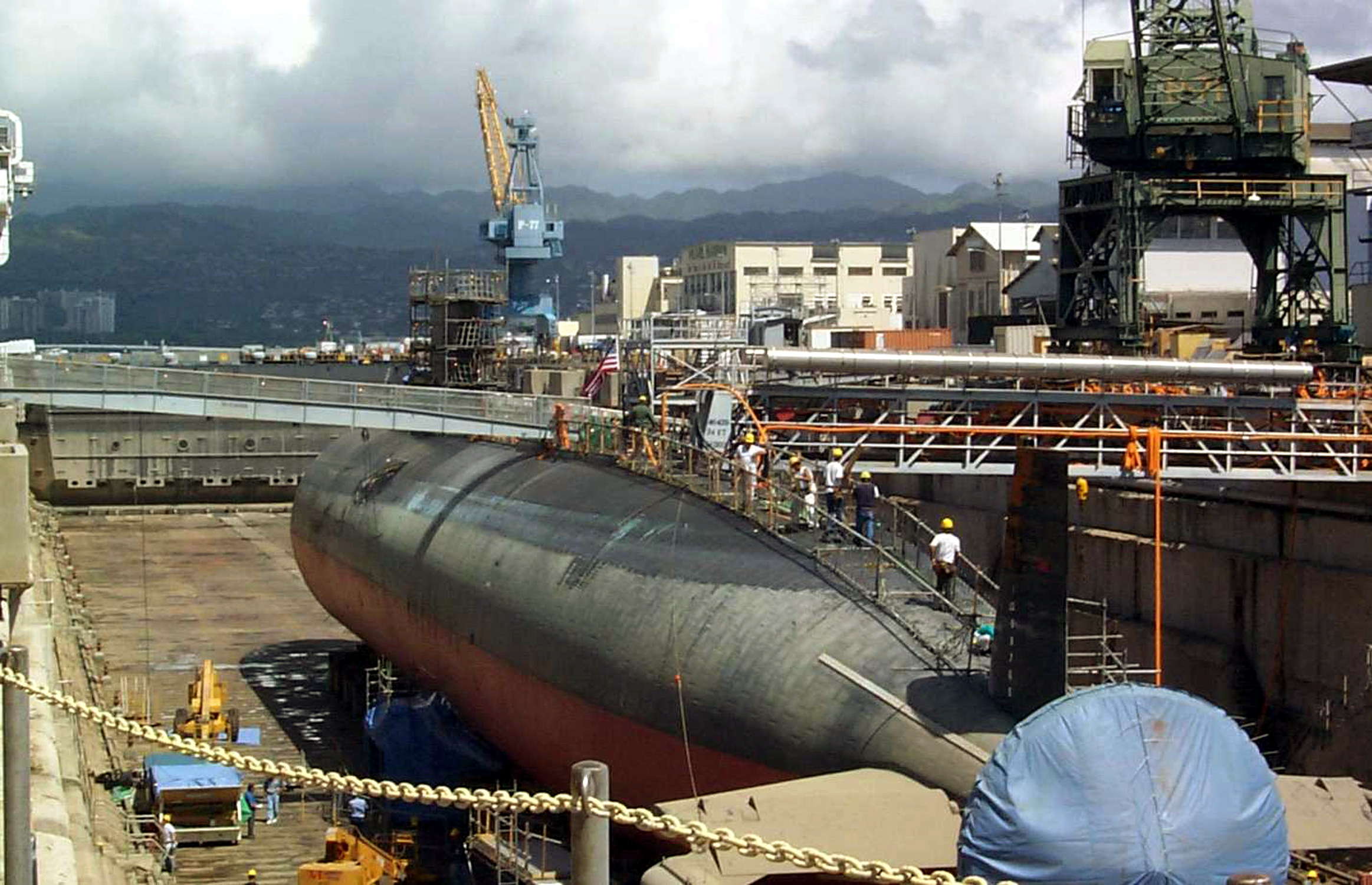
Galvanic anode on a submarine. It is the light stripe on the casing near the tailplanes.

The design of a galvanic anode CP system should consider many factors, including the type of structure, the resistivity of the electrolyte (soil or water) it will operate in, the type of coating and the service life.

The primary calculation is how much anode material will be required to protect the structure for the required time. Too little material may provide protection for a while, but need to be replaced regularly. Too much material would provide protection at an unnecessary cost. The mass in kg is given by equation (5).

Mass = (Current Required × Design Life × 8760) ÷ (Utilisation Factor × Anode Capacity)	5

- The design life is in years (1 year = 8760 hours).
- The utilisation factor (UF) of the anode is a constant value, depending on the shape of the anode and how it is attached, which signifies how much of the anode can be consumed before it ceases to be effective. A value of 0.8 indicates that 80% of the anode can be consumed, before it should be replaced. A long slender stand off anode (installed on legs to keep the anode away from the structure) has a UF value of 0.9, whereas the UF of a short, flush mounted anode is 0.8.
- Anode capacity is an indication of how much material is consumed as current flows over time. The value for zinc in seawater is 780 Ah/kg but aluminium is 2000 Ah/kg, which reflects the lower atomic mass of aluminium and means that, in theory, aluminium can produce much more current per weight than zinc before being depleted and this is one of the factors to consider when choosing a particular material.

The amount of current required corresponds directly to the surface area of the metal exposed to the soil or water, so the application of a coating drastically reduces the mass of anode material required. The better the coating, the less anode material is needed.

Once the required mass of material is known, the particular type of anode is chosen. Differently shaped anodes will have a different resistance to earth, which governs how much current can be produced, so the resistance of the anode is calculated to ensure that sufficient current will be available. If the resistance of the anode is too high, either a differently shaped or sized anode is chosen, or a greater quantity of anodes must be used.

The arrangement of the anodes is then planned so as to provide an even distribution of current over the whole structure. For example, if a particular design shows that a pipeline 10 kilometres (6.2 mi) long needs 10 anodes, then approximately one anode per kilometre would be more effective than putting all 10 anodes at one end or in the centre.

== Advantages and disadvantages ==
=== Advantages ===
- No external power sources required.
- Relatively easy to install.
- Lower voltages and current mean that risk of causing stray current interference on other structures is low.
- Require less frequent monitoring than impressed current CP systems.
- Relatively low risk of overprotection.
- Once installed, testing the system components is relatively simple for trained personnel.

=== Disadvantages ===
- Current capacity limited by anode mass and self consumption at low current density.
- Lower driving voltage means the anodes may not work in high-resistivity environments.
- Often requires that the protected structure be electrically isolated from other structures and ground.
- Anodes are heavy and will increase water resistance on moving structures or pipe interiors.
- Where D.C. power is available, electrical energy can be obtained more cheaply than by galvanic anodes.
- Where large arrays are used, wiring is needed due to high current flow and need to keep resistance losses low.
- Anodes must be carefully placed to avoid interfering with water flow into the propeller.
- To retain effectiveness, the anodes must be inspected and/or replaced as part of normal maintenance.

== Cost effectiveness ==
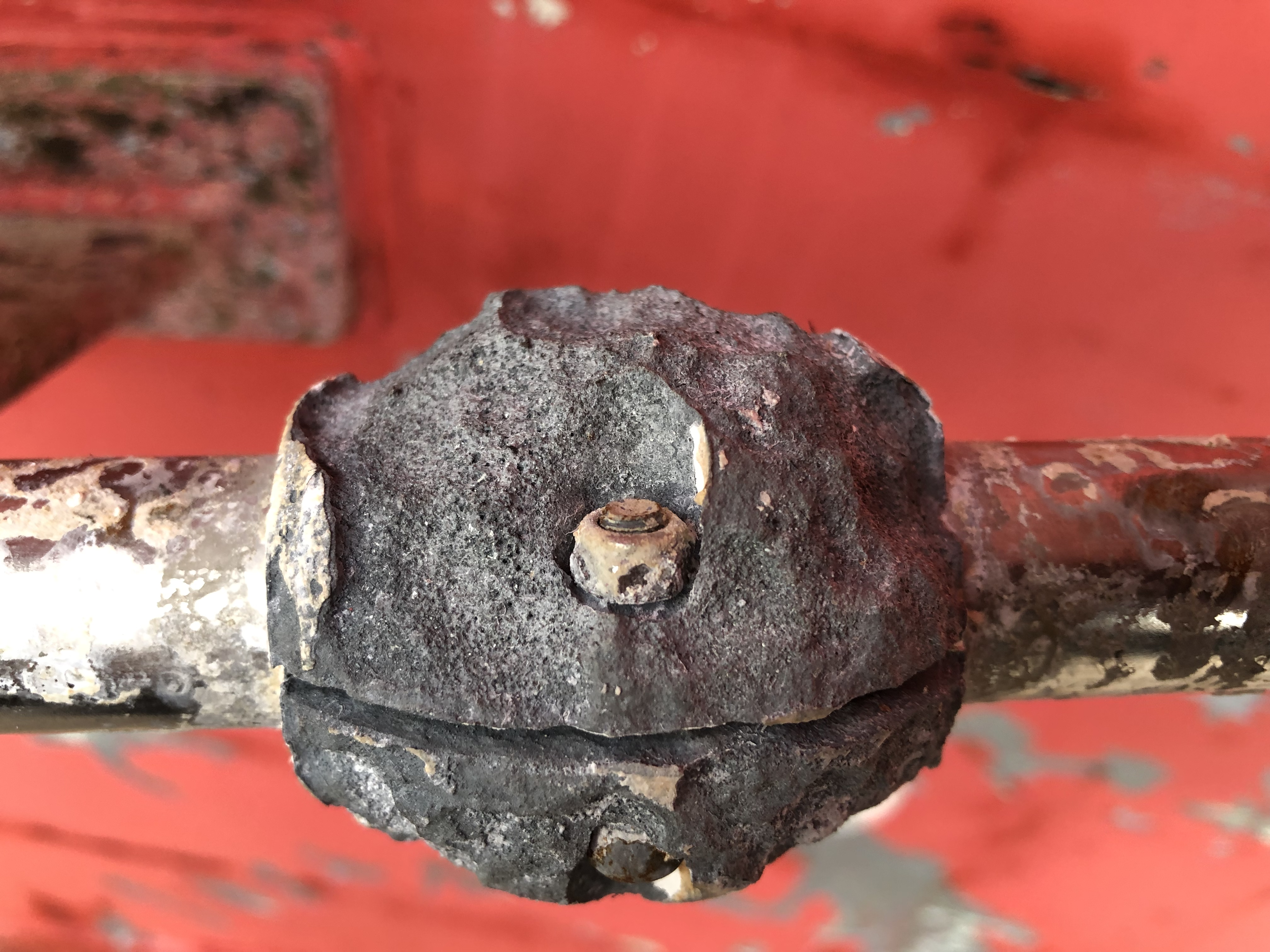
A galvanic anode (sacrificial anode) on a yacht's propeller shaft

As the anode materials used are generally more costly than iron, using this method to protect ferrous metal structures may not appear to be particularly cost effective. However, consideration should also be given to the costs incurred to repair a corroded hull or to replace a steel pipeline or tank because their structural integrity has been compromised by corrosion.

However, there is a limit to the cost effectiveness of a galvanic system. On larger structures, such as long pipelines, so many anodes may be needed that it would be more cost-effective to install impressed current cathodic protection.

== Production of sacrificial anodes ==
The basic method is to produce sacrificial anodes through a casting process. However, two casting methods can be distinguished.

The high pressure die-casting process for sacrificial anodes is widespread. It is a fully automated machine process. In order for the manufacturing process to run reliably and in a repeatable manner, a modification of the processed sacrificial anode alloy is required. Alternatively, the gravity casting process is used for the production of the sacrificial anodes. This process is performed manually or partially automated. The alloy does not have to be adapted to the manufacturing process, but is designed for 100% optimum corrosion protection.

== See also ==
- Galvanic corrosion
