= Cathodic protection =

Corrosion prevention technique

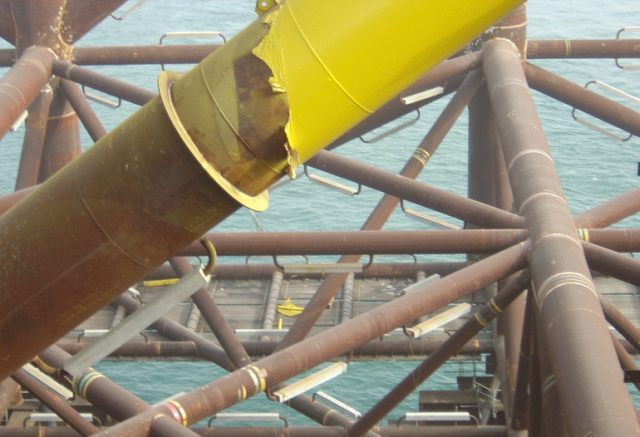
Aluminium sacrificial anodes (light colored rectangular bars) mounted on a steel jacket structure

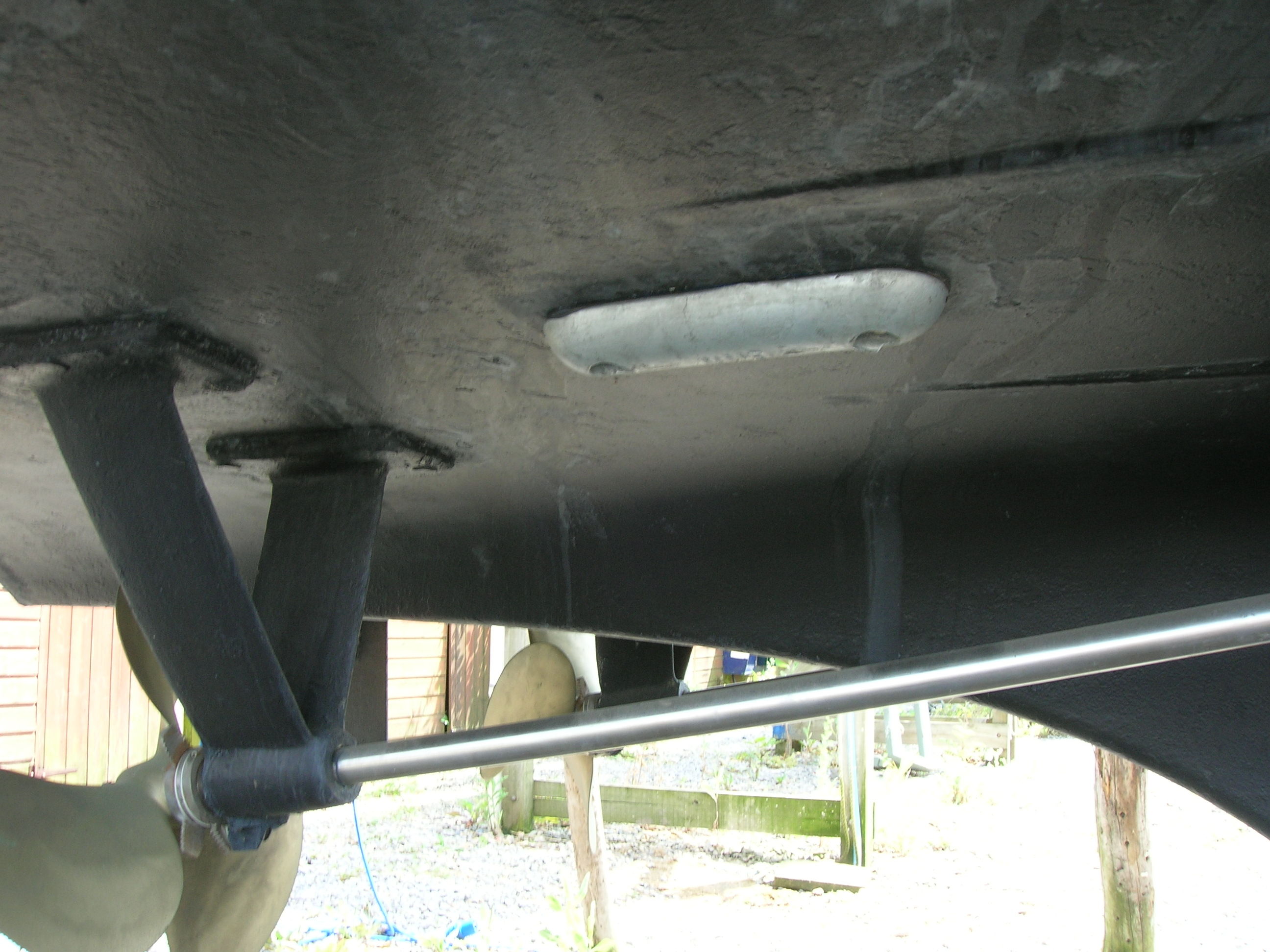
Zinc sacrificial anode (rounded object) screwed to the underside of the hull of a small boat

Cathodic protection (CP; /kæˈθɒdɪk/) is a technique used to control the corrosion of a metal surface by making it the cathode of an electrochemical cell. A simple method of protection connects the metal to be protected to a more easily corroded "sacrificial metal" to act as the anode. The sacrificial metal then corrodes instead of the protected metal. For structures such as long pipelines, where passive galvanic cathodic protection is not adequate, an external DC electrical power source is used to provide sufficient current.

Cathodic protection systems protect a wide range of metallic structures in various environments. Common applications are: steel water or fuel pipelines and steel storage tanks such as home water heaters; steel pier piles; ship and boat hulls; offshore oil platforms and onshore oil well casings; offshore wind farm foundations and metal reinforcement bars in concrete buildings and structures. Another common application is in galvanized steel, in which a sacrificial coating of zinc on steel parts protects them from rust.

Cathodic protection can, in some cases, prevent stress corrosion cracking.

== History ==
Cathodic protection was first described by Sir Humphry Davy in a series of papers presented to the Royal Society in London in 1824. The first application was to HMS Samarang in 1824. Sacrificial anodes made from iron attached to the copper sheath of the hull below the waterline dramatically reduced the corrosion rate of the copper. However, a side effect of cathodic protection was the increase in marine growth. Usually, copper when corroding releases copper ions which have an anti-fouling effect. Since excess marine growth affected the performance of the ship, the Royal Navy decided that it was better to allow the copper to corrode and have the benefit of reduced marine growth, so cathodic protection was not used further.

Davy was assisted in his experiments by his pupil Michael Faraday, who continued his research after Davy's death. In 1834, Faraday discovered the quantitative connection between corrosion weight loss and electric current and thus laid the foundation for the future application of cathodic protection.

Thomas Edison experimented with impressed current cathodic protection on ships in 1890, but was unsuccessful due to the lack of a suitable current source and anode materials. It would be 100 years after Davy's experiment before cathodic protection was used widely on oil pipelines in the United States—cathodic protection was applied to steel gas pipelines beginning in 1928 and more widely in the 1930s.

== Types ==
=== Galvanic ===
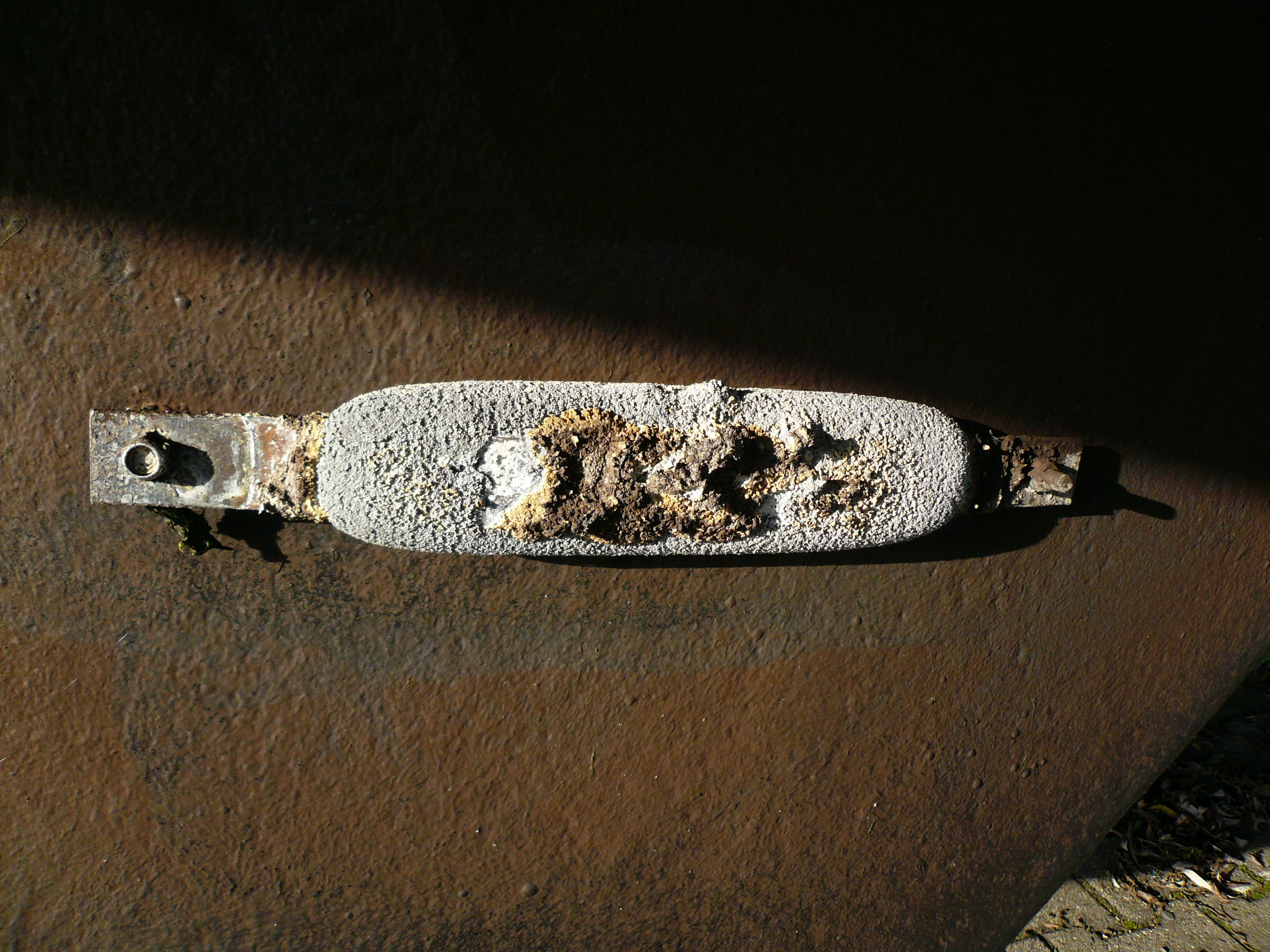
Galvanic sacrificial anode attached to the hull of a ship, showing corrosion

In the application of passive cathodic protection, a galvanic anode, a piece of a more electrochemically "active" metal (more negative electrode potential), is attached to the vulnerable metal surface where it is exposed to an electrolyte. Galvanic anodes are selected because they have a more "active" voltage than the metal of the target structure (typically steel).

Concrete has a pH around 13. In this environment the steel reinforcement has a passive protective layer and remains largely stable. Galvanic systems are "constant potential" systems that aim to restore the concrete's natural protective environment by providing a high initial current to restore passivity. It then reverts to a lower sacrificial current, while harmful negative chloride ions migrate away from the steel and towards the positive anode. The anodes remain reactive through their lifetime (10–20 years typically), increasing current when the resistivity decreases due to corrosion hazards such as rainfall, temperature increases, or flooding. The reactive nature of these anodes makes them an efficient choice.

Unlike impressed current cathodic protection (ICCP) systems, steel constant polarization is not the goal, rather the restoration of the environment. Polarization of the target structure is caused by the electron flow from the anode to the cathode, so the two metals must have a good electrically conductive contact. The driving force for the cathodic protection current is the difference in electrode potential between the anode and the cathode. During the initial phase of high current, the potential of the steel surface is polarized (pushed) more negative protecting the steel which hydroxide ion generation at the steel surface and ionic migration restore the concrete environment.

Over time the galvanic anode continues to corrode, consuming the anode material until eventually it must be replaced.

Galvanic or sacrificial anodes are made in various shapes and sizes using alloys of zinc, magnesium, and aluminium. ASTM International publishes standards on the composition and manufacturing of galvanic anodes.

In order for galvanic cathodic protection to work, the anode must possess a lower (that is, more negative) electrode potential than that of the cathode (the target structure to be protected). The table below shows a simplified galvanic series which is used to select the anode metal. The anode must be chosen from a material that is lower on the list than the material to be protected.

Potential with respect to a Cu:CuSO_{4} reference electrode in neutral pH environment
Metal	Potential (volts)
Carbon, Graphite, Coke	+0.3
Platinum	0 to −0.1
Mill scale on Steel	−0.2
High Silicon Cast Iron	−0.2
Copper, brass, bronze	−0.2
Mild steel in concrete	−0.2
Lead	−0.5
Cast iron (not graphitized)	−0.5
Mild steel (rusted)	−0.2 to −0.5
Mild steel (clean)	−0.5 to −0.8
Commercially pure aluminium	−0.8
Aluminium alloy (5% zinc)	−1.05
Zinc	−1.1
Magnesium alloy (6% Al, 3% Zn, 0.15% Mn)	−1.6
Commercially Pure Magnesium	−1.75

=== Impressed current cathodic protection (ICCP) ===
Simple impressed current cathodic protection system. A source of DC electric current is used to help drive the protective electrochemical reaction.

In some cases, impressed current cathodic protection (ICCP) systems are used. These consist of anodes connected to a DC power source, often a transformer-rectifier connected to AC power. In the absence of an AC supply, alternative power sources may be used, such as solar panels, wind power or gas powered thermoelectric generators.

Anodes for ICCP systems are available in a variety of shapes and sizes. Common anodes are tubular and solid rod shapes or continuous ribbons of various materials. These include high silicon, cast iron, graphite, mixed metal oxide (MMO), platinum and niobium coated wire and other materials.

For pipelines, anodes are arranged in groundbeds either distributed or in a deep vertical hole depending on several design and field condition factors including current distribution requirements.

Cathodic protection transformer-rectifier units are often custom manufactured and equipped with a variety of features, including remote monitoring and control, integral current interrupters and various type of electrical enclosures. The output DC negative terminal is connected to the structure to be protected by the cathodic protection system. The rectifier output DC positive cable is connected to the anodes. The AC power cable is connected to the rectifier input terminals.

The output of the ICCP system should be optimized to provide enough current to provide protection to the target structure. Some cathodic protection transformer-rectifier units are designed with taps on the transformer windings and jumper terminals to select the voltage output of the ICCP system. Cathodic protection transformer-rectifier units for water tanks and used in other applications are made with solid state circuits to automatically adjust the operating voltage to maintain the optimum current output or structure-to-electrolyte potential. Analog or digital meters are often installed to show the operating voltages (DC and sometimes AC) and current output. For shore structures and other large complex target structures, ICCP systems are often designed with multiple independent zones of anodes with separate cathodic protection transformer-rectifier circuits.

=== Hybrid systems ===
Hybrid systems use a combination of the aforementioned systems to achieve some of the benefits of both, utilizing the restorative capabilities of ICCP systems but maintaining the reactive, lower cost, and easier-to-maintain nature of a galvanic anode.

The system is made up of wired galvanic anodes in arrays typically 400 millimetres (16 in) apart, which are then initially powered for a short period to restore the concrete and to power ionic migration. The power supply is then taken away and the anodes are simply attached to the steel as a galvanic system. More powered phases can be administered if needed. Like galvanic systems, corrosion rate monitoring from polarization tests and half-cell potential mapping can be used to measure corrosion. Polarization is not the goal for the life of the system.

== Applications ==
=== Water heaters ===
This technology is also used to protect water heaters. The electrons sent by the imposed current anode (composed of titanium and covered with MMO) prevent the inside of the tank from rusting.

In order to be recognized as effective, these anodes must comply with certain standards: A cathodic protection system is considered efficient when its potential reaches or exceeds the limits established by the cathodic protection criteria. The cathode protection criteria used come from the standard NACE SP0388-2007 (formerly RP0388-2001) of the NACE National Association of Corrosion Engineers.

=== Pipelines ===
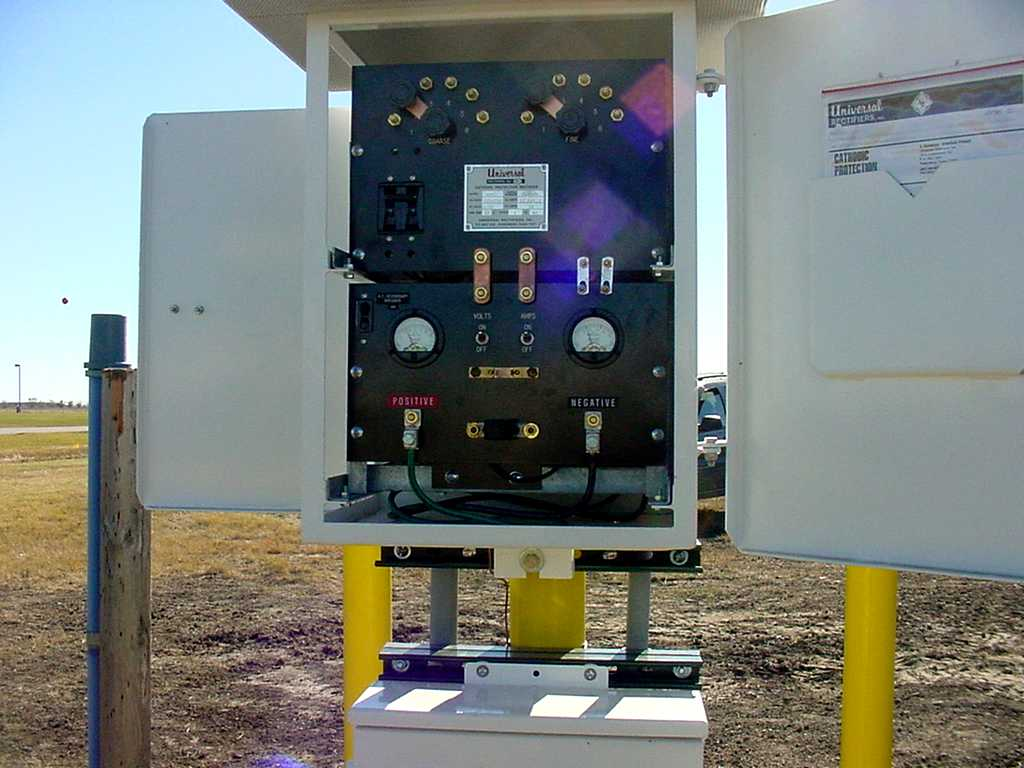
An air cooled cathodic protection rectifier connected to a pipeline

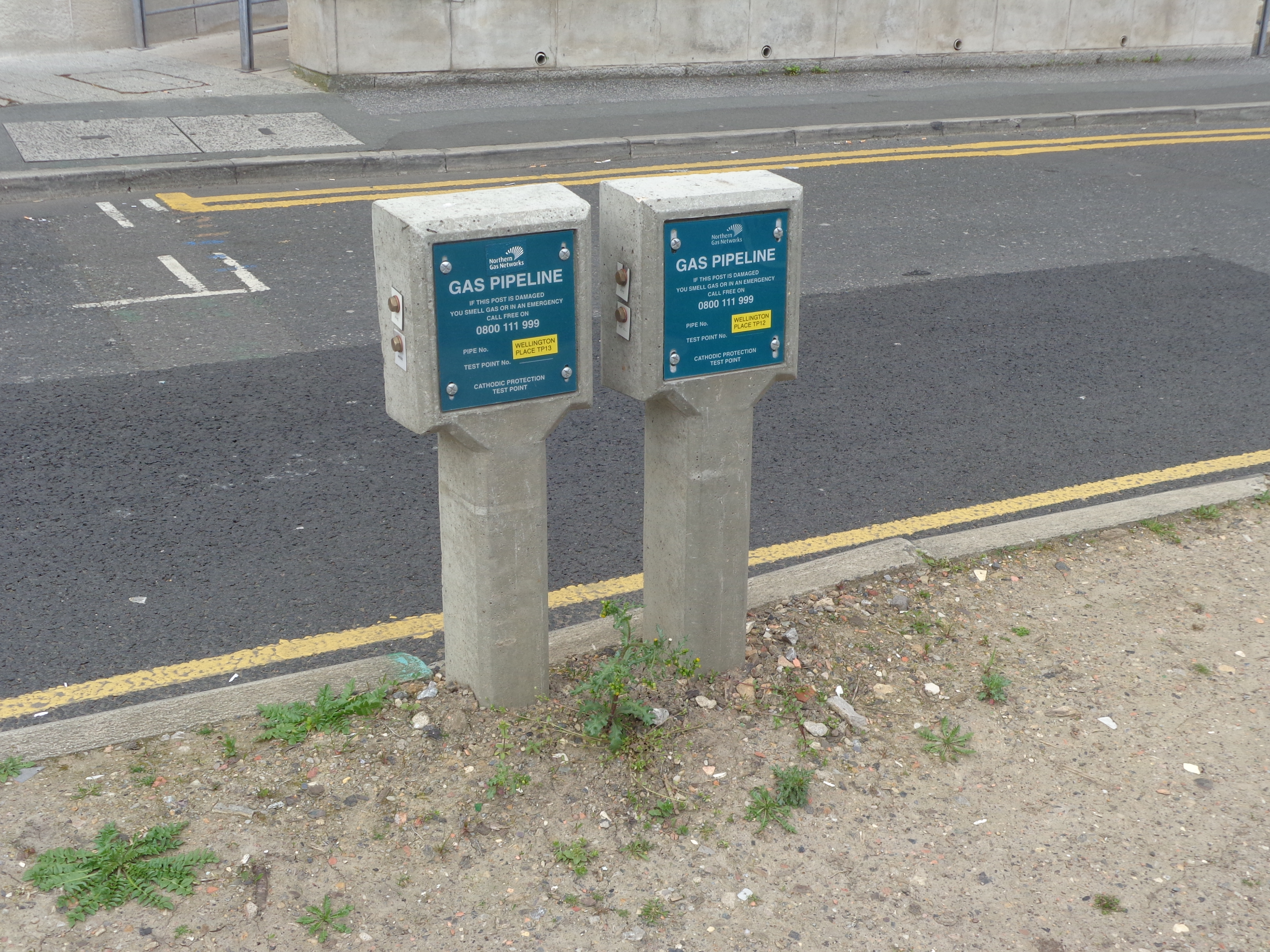
Cathodic protection markers over a gas pipeline in Leeds, West Yorkshire, England

Hazardous product pipelines are routinely protected by a coating supplemented with cathodic protection. An impressed current cathodic protection system (ICCP) for a pipeline consists of a DC power source, often an AC powered transformer rectifier and an anode, or array of anodes buried in the ground (the anode groundbed).

The DC power source would typically have a DC output of up to 50 amperes and 50 volts, but this depends on several factors, such as the size of the pipeline and coating quality. The positive DC output terminal would be connected via cables to the anode array, while another cable would connect the negative terminal of the rectifier to the pipeline, preferably through junction boxes to allow measurements to be taken.

Anodes can be installed in a groundbed consisting of a vertical hole backfilled with conductive coke (a material that improves the performance and life of the anodes) or laid in a prepared trench, surrounded by conductive coke and backfilled. The choice of groundbed type and size depends on the application, location and soil resistivity.

The DC cathodic protection current is then adjusted to the optimum level after conducting various tests including measurements of pipe-to-soil potentials or electrode potential.

When designing the system, and periodically after installation, engineers will conduct a baseline measurement campaign, during which all existing active protection systems in the area will be switched off (or as many as possible) and the native or natural pipe-to-electrode potential is recorded. This measurement will provide clues about how the pipeline can be sectioned into electrical systems, how many anodes and rectifiers will be needed and where they should be placed.

It is sometimes more economically viable to protect a pipeline using galvanic (sacrificial) anodes. This is often the case on smaller diameter pipelines of limited length. Galvanic anodes rely on the galvanic series potentials of the metals to drive cathodic protection current from the anode to the structure being protected.

Water pipelines of various pipe materials are also provided with cathodic protection where owners determine the cost is reasonable for the expected pipeline service life extension attributed to the application of cathodic protection.

=== Ships and boats ===
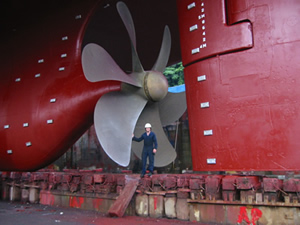
The white patches visible on the ship's hull are zinc block sacrificial anodes.

Cathodic protection on ships is often implemented by galvanic anodes attached to the hull and ICCP for larger vessels. Since ships are regularly removed from the water for inspections and maintenance, it is a simple task to replace the galvanic anodes.

Galvanic anodes are generally shaped to reduced drag in the water and fitted flush to the hull to also try to minimize drag.

Smaller vessels, with non-metallic hulls, such as yachts, are equipped with galvanic anodes to protect areas such as outboard motors. As with all galvanic cathodic protection, this application relies on a solid electrical connection between the anode and the item to be protected.

For ICCP on ships, the anodes are usually constructed of a relatively inert material such as platinized titanium. A DC power supply is provided within the ship and the anodes mounted on the outside of the hull. The anode cables are introduced into the ship via a compression seal fitting and routed to the DC power source. The negative cable from the power supply is simply attached to the hull to complete the circuit. Ship ICCP anodes are flush-mounted, minimizing the effects of drag on the ship, and located a minimum 5 ft below the light load line in an area to avoid mechanical damage. The current density required for protection is a function of velocity and considered when selecting the current capacity and location of anode placement on the hull.

Some ships may require specialist treatment, for example aluminium hulls with steel fixtures will create an electrochemical cell where the aluminium hull can act as a galvanic anode and corrosion is enhanced. In cases like this, aluminium or zinc galvanic anodes can be used to offset the potential difference between the aluminium hull and the steel fixture. If the steel fixtures are large, several galvanic anodes may be required, or even a small ICCP system.

=== Marine ===
Marine cathodic protection covers many areas, jetties, harbors, offshore structures. The variety of different types of structure leads to a variety of systems to provide protection. Galvanic anodes are favored, but ICCP can also often be used. Because of the wide variety of structure geometry, composition, and architecture, specialized firms are often required to engineer structure-specific cathodic protection systems. Sometimes marine structures require retroactive modification to be effectively protected

=== Steel in concrete ===
The application to concrete reinforcement is slightly different in that the anodes and reference electrodes are usually embedded in the concrete at the time of construction when the concrete is being poured. The usual technique for concrete buildings, bridges and similar structures is to use ICCP, but there are systems available that use the principle of galvanic cathodic protection as well, although in the UK at least, the use of galvanic anodes for atmospherically exposed reinforced concrete structures is considered experimental.

For ICCP, the principle is the same as any other ICCP system. However, in a typical atmospherically exposed concrete structure such as a bridge, there will be many more anodes distributed through the structure as opposed to an array of anodes as used on a pipeline. This makes for a more complicated system and usually an automatically controlled DC power source is used, possibly with an option for remote monitoring and operation. For buried or submerged structures, the treatment is similar to that of any other buried or submerged structure.

Galvanic systems offer the advantage of being easier to retrofit and do not need any control systems as ICCP does.

For pipelines constructed from pre-stressed concrete cylinder pipe (PCCP), the techniques used for cathodic protection are generally as for steel pipelines except that the applied potential must be limited to prevent damage to the prestressing wire.

The steel wire in a PCCP pipeline is stressed to the point that any corrosion of the wire can result in failure. An additional problem is that any excessive hydrogen ions as a result of an excessively negative potential can cause hydrogen embrittlement of the wire, also resulting in failure. The failure of too many wires will result in catastrophic failure of the PCCP. To implement ICCP therefore requires very careful control to ensure satisfactory protection. A simpler option is to use galvanic anodes, which are self-limiting and need no control.

=== Internal cathodic protection ===
Vessels, pipelines and tanks (including ballast tanks) which are used to store or transport liquids can also be protected from corrosion on their internal surfaces by the use of cathodic protection. ICCP and galvanic systems can be used. A common application of internal cathodic protection is water storage tanks and power plant shell and tube heat exchangers.

=== Galvanized steel ===
Galvanizing generally refers to hot-dip galvanizing which is a way of coating steel with a layer of metallic zinc or tin. Lead or antimony are often added to the molten zinc bath, and also other metals have been studied. Galvanized coatings are quite durable in most environments because they combine the barrier properties of a coating with some of the benefits of cathodic protection. If the zinc coating is scratched or otherwise locally damaged and steel is exposed, the surrounding areas of zinc coating form a galvanic cell with the exposed steel and protect it from corrosion. This is a form of localized cathodic protection - the zinc acts as a sacrificial anode.

Galvanizing, while using the electrochemical principle of cathodic protection, is not actually cathodic but sacrificial protection. In the case of galvanizing, only areas very close to the zinc are protected. Hence, a larger area of bare steel would only be protected around the edges.

=== Automobiles ===
Several companies market electronic devices claiming to mitigate corrosion for automobiles and trucks. Corrosion control professionals find they do not work. There is no peer reviewed scientific testing and validation supporting the use of the devices. In 1996 the FTC ordered David McCready, a person that sold devices claiming to protect cars from corrosion, to pay restitution and banned the names "Rust Buster" and "Rust Evader".

Under section 74.01(1) (b) of the Competition Act Canada, no performance claims about a product or its effectiveness can be done unless it can be proven that they are based on adequate and proper tests. The Competition Bureau Canada proceeded to investigate several companies selling electronic corrosion devices in Canada. Some were forced to withdraw their product from the market as they could not support their claims scientifically.

== Testing ==
Electrode potential is measured with reference electrodes. Copper–copper sulphate electrodes are used for structures in contact with soil or fresh water. Silver/silver chloride/seawater electrodes or pure zinc electrodes are used for seawater applications. The methods are described in EN 13509:2003 and NACE TM0497 along with the sources of error in the voltage that appears on the display of the meter. Interpretation of electrode potential measurements to determine the potential at the interface between the anode of the corrosion cell and the electrolyte requires training and cannot be expected to match the accuracy of measurements done in laboratory work.

== Problems ==
=== Production of hydrogen ===
A side effect of improperly applied cathodic protection is the production of atomic hydrogen, leading to its absorption in the protected metal and subsequent hydrogen embrittlement of welds and materials with high hardness. Under normal conditions, the atomic hydrogen will combine at the metal surface to create hydrogen gas, which cannot penetrate the metal. Hydrogen atoms, however, are small enough to pass through the crystalline steel structure, and can lead in some cases to hydrogen embrittlement.

=== Cathodic disbonding ===
This is a process of disbondment of protective coatings from the protected structure (cathode) due to the formation of hydrogen ions over the surface of the protected material (cathode). Disbonding can be exacerbated by an increase in alkali ions and an increase in cathodic polarization. The degree of disbonding is also reliant on the type of coating, with some coatings affected more than others. Cathodic protection systems should be operated so that the structure does not become excessively polarized, since this also promotes disbonding due to excessively negative potentials. Cathodic disbonding occurs rapidly in pipelines that contain hot fluids because the process is accelerated by heat flow.

=== Cathodic shielding ===
Effectiveness of cathodic protection (CP) systems on steel pipelines can be impaired by the use of solid film backed dielectric coatings such as polyethylene tapes, shrinkable pipeline sleeves, and factory applied single or multiple solid film coatings. This phenomenon occurs because of the high electrical resistivity of these film backings. Protective electric current from the cathodic protection system is blocked or shielded from reaching the underlying metal by the highly resistive film backing. Cathodic shielding was first defined in the 1980s as being a problem, and technical papers on the subject have been regularly published since then.

A 1999 report concerning a 20,600 bbl (3,280 m^{3}) spill from a Saskatchewan crude oil line contains an excellent definition of the cathodic shielding problem:

The triple situation of disbondment of the (corrosion) coating, the dielectric nature of the coating and the unique electrochemical environment established under the exterior coating, which acts as a shield to the electrical CP current, is referred to as CP shielding. The combination of tenting and disbondment permits a corrosive environment around the outside of the pipe to enter into the void between the exterior coating and the pipe surface. With the development of this CP shielding phenomenon, impressed current from the CP system cannot access exposed metal under the exterior coating to protect the pipe surface from the consequences of an aggressive corrosive environment. The CP shielding phenomenon induces changes in the potential gradient of the CP system across the exterior coating, which are further pronounced in areas of insufficient or sub-standard CP current emanating from the pipeline's CP system. This produces an area on the pipeline of insufficient CP defense against metal loss aggravated by an exterior corrosive environment.

Cathodic shielding is referenced in a number of the standards listed below. Newly issued USDOT regulation Title 49 CFR 192.112, in the section for Additional design requirements for steel pipe using alternative maximum allowable operating pressure requires that "The pipe must be protected against external corrosion by a non-shielding coating" (see coatings section on standard). Also, the NACE SP0169:2007 standard defines shielding in section 2, cautions against the use of materials that create electrical shielding in section 4.2.3, cautions against use of external coatings that create electrical shielding in section 5.1.2.3, and instructs readers to take "appropriate action" when the effects of electrical shielding of cathodic protection current are detected on an operating pipeline in section 10.9.

== Certification ==
In many countries, having a related CP certificate is recommended or, in some cases, mandatory for doing a CP job, from field test to design. There are different certification bodies and evaluation methods, but two of them are more common: AMPP certification and ISO 15257.

AMPP cathodic protection certification has four levels: Tester, Technician, Technologist, and Specialist.

ISO 15257 has five levels: Four levels close to the AMPP definition, plus another level for those who have made a scientific contribution.

=== Countries ===
==== France ====
The main center for cathodic protection certification in France and some French language countries is CEFRACOR.

==== Germany ====
fkks cert GmbH (owned by fkks: Fachverband Kathodischer Korrosionsschutz e.V., trans. German Professional Association for Cathodic Protection specialists) is an accredited certification scheme in the field of cathodic corrosion protection.

==== Italy ====
Three different bodies will provide cathodic protection certificates based on ISO 15257: APCERT, CICPND, and RINA.

==== UK ====
Institute of Corrosion (ICorr), Corrosion Prevention Association (CPA), and TWI offer a Cathodic Protection, Training, Assessment, and Certification Scheme that evaluates the competence levels of cathodic protection personnel.

==== US ====
AMPP is the main certification body. Moreover, AMPP is highly active and known in the Middle East.

== Standards ==
- 49 CFR 192.451 - Requirements for Corrosion Control - Transportation of natural and other gas by pipeline: US minimum federal safety standards
- 49 CFR 195.551 - Requirements for Corrosion Control - Transportation of hazardous liquids by pipelines: US minimum federal safety standards
- AS 2832 - Australian Standards for Cathodic Protection
- ASME B31Q 0001-0191
- ASTM G 8, G 42 - Evaluating Cathodic Disbondment resistance of coatings
- DNV-RP-B401 - Cathodic Protection Design - Det Norske Veritas
- EN 12068:1999 - Cathodic protection. External organic coatings for the corrosion protection of buried or immersed steel pipelines used in conjunction with cathodic protection. Tapes and shrinkable materials
- EN 12473:2000 - General principles of cathodic protection in sea water
- EN 12474:2001 - Cathodic protection for submarine pipelines
- EN 12495:2000 - Cathodic protection for fixed steel offshore structures
- EN 12499:2003 - Internal cathodic protection of metallic structures
- EN 12696:2012 - Cathodic protection of steel in concrete
- EN 12954:2001 - Cathodic protection of buried or immersed metallic structures. General principles and application for pipelines
- EN 13173:2001 - Cathodic protection for steel offshore floating structures
- EN 13174:2001 - Cathodic protection for "Harbour Installations".
- EN 13509:2003 - Cathodic protection measurement techniques
- EN 13636:2004 - Cathodic protection of buried metallic tanks and related piping
- EN 14505:2005 - Cathodic protection of complex structures
- EN 15112:2006 - External cathodic protection of well casing
- EN 15280-2013 - Evaluation of a.c. corrosion likelihood of buried pipelines
- EN 50162:2004 - Protection against corrosion by stray current from direct current systems
- BS 7361-1:1991 - Cathodic Protection
- NACE SP0169:2013 - Control of External Corrosion on Underground or Submerged Metallic Piping Systems
- NACE TM 0497 - Measurement Techniques Related to Criteria for Cathodic Protection on Underground or Submerged Metallic Piping Systems

== See also ==
- Anodic protection
- Cathodic modification
- Corrosion engineering
- Redox
- Wetting voltage

== Publications and further reading ==
- A.W. Peabody, Peabody's Control of Pipeline Corrosion, 2nd Ed., 2001, NACE International. ISBN 1-57590-092-0
- Davy, H., Phil. Trans. Roy. Soc., 114,151,242 and 328 (1824)
- Ashworth V., Corrosion Vol. 2, 3rd Ed., 1994, ISBN 0-7506-1077-8
- Baeckmann, Schwenck & Prinz, Handbook of Cathodic Corrosion Protection, 3rd Edition 1997. ISBN 0-88415-056-9
- Scherer, L. F., Oil and Gas Journal, (1939)
- ASTM B843 - 07 Standard Specification for Magnesium Alloy Anodes for Cathodic Protection
- ASTM B418 - 09 Standard Specification for Cast and Wrought Galvanic Zinc Anodes
- Roberge, Pierre R, Handbook of Corrosion Engineering 1999 ISBN 0-07-076516-2
- NACE International Paper 09043 Coatings Used in Conjunction with Cathodic Protection - Shielding vs Non-shielding Coatings
- NACE International TM0497-2002, Measurement Techniques Related to Criteria for Cathodic Protection on Underground or Submerged Metallic Piping Systems
- Transportation Safety Board of Canada, Report Number P99H0021, 1999
- Covino, Bernard S, et al., Performance of Zinc Anodes for Cathodic Protection of Reinforced Concrete Bridges, Oregon Dept of Transport & Federal Highway Administration, March 2002
- UK Highways Agency BA 83/02; Design Manual for Roads and Bridges, Vol.3, Sect.3, Part 3, Cathodic Protection For Use In Reinforced Concrete Highway Structures. Archived 2015-09-24 at the Wayback Machine (Retrieved 2011-01-04)
- Daily, Steven F, Using Cathodic Protection to Control Corrosion of Reinforced Concrete Structures in Marine Environments (published in Port Technology International)
- Gummow, RA, Corrosion Control of Municipal Infrastructure Using Cathodic Protection. NACE Conference Oct 1999, NACE Materials Performance Feb 2000
- EN 12473:2000 - General principles of cathodic protection in sea water
- EN 12499:2003 - Internal cathodic protection of metallic structures
- NACE RP0100-2000 Cathodic Protection of Prestressed Concrete Cylinder Pipelines
- BS 7361-1:1991 - Cathodic Protection
- SAE International Paper No. 912270 Robert Baboian, State of the Art in Automobile Cathodic Protection, Proceedings of the 5th Automotive Corrosion and Prevention Conference, P-250, Warrendale, PA, USA, August 1991
- US Army Corps of Engineers, Engineering manual 1110-2-2704, 12 July 2004
