= Galvanic series =

Method to determine the nobility of metals and semi-metals

The galvanic series (or electropotential series) determines the nobility of metals and semi-metals. When two metals are submerged in an electrolyte, while also electrically connected by some external conductor, the less noble (base) will experience galvanic corrosion. The rate of corrosion is determined by the electrolyte, the difference in nobility, and the relative areas of the anode and cathode exposed to the electrolyte. The difference can be measured as a difference in voltage potential: the less noble metal is the one with a lower (that is, more negative) electrode potential than the nobler one, and will function as the anode (electron or anion attractor) within the electrolyte device functioning as described above (a galvanic cell). Galvanic reaction is the principle upon which batteries are based.

See the table of standard electrode potentials for more details.

== Galvanic series (most noble at top) ==
The following is the galvanic series for stagnant (that is, low oxygen content) seawater. The order may change in different environments.

- Graphite
- Palladium
- Platinum
- Gold
- Silver
- Titanium
- Stainless steel 316 (passivated)
- Stainless steel 304 (passivated)
- Silicon bronze
- Stainless steel 316 (active)
- Monel 400
- Phosphor bronze
- Admiralty brass
- Cupronickel
- Molybdenum
- Red brass
- Brass plating
- Yellow brass
- Naval brass 464
- Uranium 8% Mo
- Niobium 1% Zr
- Tungsten
- Tin
- Lead
- Stainless steel 304 (active)
- Tantalum
- Chromium plating
- Nickel (passive)
- Copper
- Nickel (active)
- Cast iron
- Steel
- Indium
- Aluminum
- Uranium (pure)
- Cadmium
- Beryllium
- Zinc plating (see galvanization)
- Magnesium

== Visual Representation ==
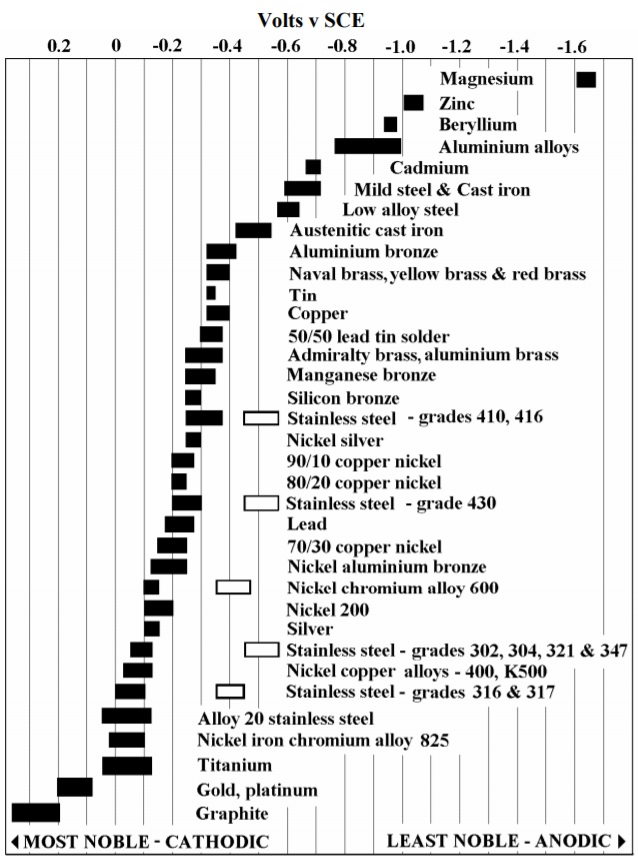

The unshaded bars indicate the location on the chart of those steels when in acidic/stagnant water.

== See also ==
- Cathodic protection
- Anodic index
- Galvanic corrosion
- Noble metal
