= 2023 United Kingdom reinforced autoclaved aerated concrete crisis =

Building safety crisis in the UK

The 2023 United Kingdom reinforced autoclaved aerated concrete crisis relates to increased safety concerns over reinforced autoclaved aerated concrete (RAAC), commonly used historically in roofing and wall construction within the public sector, having gained popularity in the mid-1950s as a cheaper and more lightweight alternative to conventional reinforced concrete.

Structural issues involving RAAC began surfacing publicly in the United Kingdom in the 1990s. Concerns were amplified in 2023 following reports of an earlier roofing collapse at a British primary school, which fell without warning in 2018. The material is still present in the UK in public buildings such as schools and hospitals. The material's nature makes it difficult to identify these issues before collapse, leading to the Department for Education issuing emergency closures to a number of schools due to the risk to pupils.

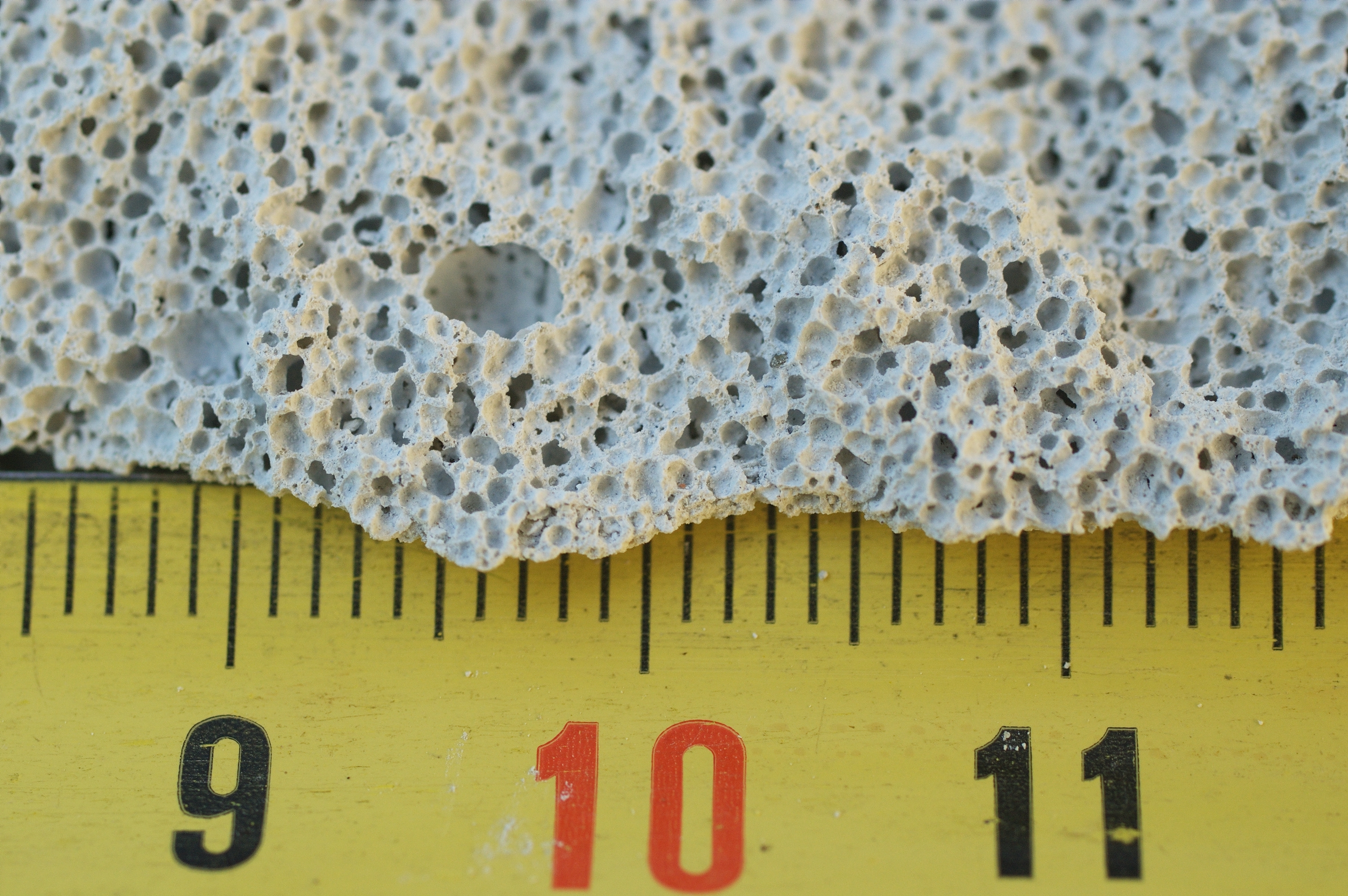
Detail of air bubbles in aerated autoclaved concrete component of RAAC, which reduce the material's density. Note, no reinforcing steel is shown.

== Background ==
RAAC has been shown to have limited structural reinforcement bar (rebar) integrity in 40 to 50 year-old RAAC roof panels, which began to be observed in the 1990s. The material is liable to fail without visible deterioration or warning. The material is not the root cause, rather inadequate roof maintenance, which permits water infiltration, and decisions by building owners as to repair or the replacement of existing roofs, which is a part of cost-benefit analysis.

Professional engineering concern was publicly raised in 1995 about the structural performance of RAAC following inspections of cracked units in British school roofs. Structural deficiencies and signs of corrosion were observed in 1996. It was then recommended that owners of buildings, including schools, arrange for RAAC roofs to be inspected. Concern regarding the material was subsequently raised in July 2018, following a roof collapse at Singlewell primary school in Gravesend, Kent. In August 2022, the UK Government Property Agency stated that "RAAC is now life-expired and liable to collapse".

In 2023, the UK government raised concerns about the structural integrity of buildings containing RAAC, and ordered remedial action to be taken.

In May 2023, the Secretary of State for Health and Social Care, Steve Barclay, confirmed seven hospitals in England, which were constructed largely with RAAC, were not safe to operate beyond 2030. The hospitals were surveyed in 2022. His list included Airedale General Hospital in West Yorkshire, for which a rebuild was approved that month, as 83 per cent of the hospital was constructed of RAAC, with the ceiling held up by jack posts (props).

== School closures and spread of concerns ==
In August 2023, more than 100 school buildings in England were ordered to be closed while safety measures were installed, after a beam collapsed at a school. The figure was later revised to 174. The Health and Safety Executive warned that RAAC could "collapse with little or no notice". Other public buildings such as Harrow Crown Court (which opened in 1991) and Royal & Derngate theatre in Northampton were also closed indefinitely. A number of other theatres have subsequently been found to have RAAC. The Scottish Government subsequently confirmed that RAAC had been found in 35 of Scotland's council-run schools. This figure was later revised to 40 following continued inspection, with the First Minister, Humza Yousaf, confirming that fire stations and NHS buildings were also affected. In Wales, RAAC had been found at four schools by 14 September: two in Anglesey, one in Denbighshire and one in Conwy. One of the Anglesey schools had reopened following inspection, while the other three were closed while they underwent inspection.

On 3 September, Jeremy Hunt said the UK government would "spend what it takes" to put right defective concrete in schools, but conceded that structural problems could be identified in more schools and other public buildings. On the same day, Neil Gray, Scotland's Wellbeing Economy Secretary, said there was no immediate risk to schools in Scotland. On 4 September, and after confirming that more schools could be affected, Education Secretary Gillian Keegan was recorded on camera by ITV News criticising "others" for being "sat on their arses" while suggesting the UK government should be thanked for their response. She later apologised for her use of language and said her comments were "off the cuff" and "unnecessary". On the same day, the UK government ordered an urgent investigation into court buildings built in the 1990s to determine whether they contained defective concrete. On 6 September, a team of experts from Loughborough University recommended safety checks should be carried out on tens of thousands of publicly and privately owned buildings for RAAC. On 7 September, it was reported that a number of theatres had closed temporarily as a precautionary measure after crumbling concrete was found at venues in Dartford, Cardiff, Northampton and Carlisle, and while structural tests were carried out. Buildings at 13 UK universities told the BBC some buildings had been closed as a result of RAAC being discovered on campus, with nine reported to be in Scotland. On 8 September, both Heathrow and Gatwick Airports said they were monitoring porous concrete after discovering RAAC in buildings on site. On 11 September, it emerged that the reopening of Preston Guild Hall, closed for renovation since 2019, would be delayed while inspections were carried out to see it RAAC was present in its roof panels. On 20 September, Bridgend Indoor Market in the town's Rhiw Shopping Centre was closed with immediate effect after RAAC was discovered in the roof.

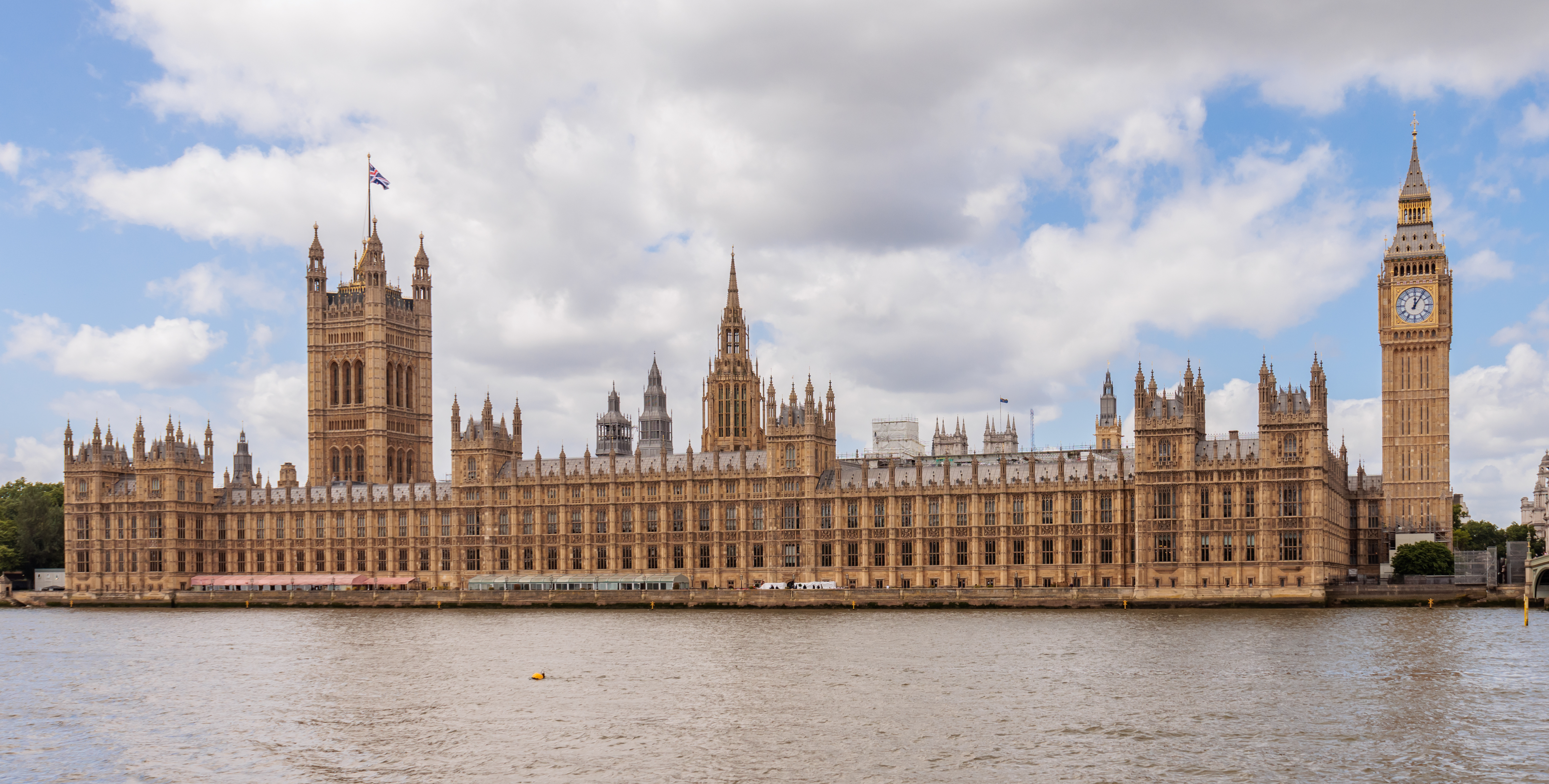
In September 2023, RAAC was discovered at the Houses of Parliament

On 4 September, Jonathan Slater, a former civil servant, claimed that British Prime Minister Rishi Sunak reduced the funds available for school repairs during his tenure as Chancellor of the Exchequer. On 5 September, a BBC News investigation found that at least 13 schools affected by defective concrete had funding for rebuilding withdrawn in 2010. That number was later revised to 17. On 6 September, the Opposition Labour Party unsuccessfully attempted to force a parliamentary vote that would force the government to publish documents relating to school funding while Sunak was Chancellor.

On 12 September 2023, it was reported that RAAC had been discovered in the Palace of Westminster. A parliamentary spokesperson claimed there was no ‘immediate risk’ to life. On 3 October, Aberdeen City Council said that RAAC was likely to have been used in hundreds of properties in the city. Sheffield City Council announced that 40,000 properties would be examined for possible RAAC. On 19 October, the UK government published an updated list of 214 schools and colleges in England affected by reinforced autoclaved aerated concrete. This included a number in the East of England. Three more schools in Surrey were added to the list. RAAC was discovered in a further 18 hospitals.

On 29 November, the first case of RAAC to be discovered in Northern Ireland was found at a South Belfast primary school. On 29 February 2024, it was reported that Aberdeen City Council were in the process of rehoming tenants in around 500 properties following the discovery of reinforced autoclaved aerated concrete in some of the buildings. On 11 March, the occupants of around forty houses in Hirwaun, South Wales, managed by Trivallis Housing Association, were advised to evacuate the properties following the discovery of reinforced autoclaved aerated concrete.

== Repairs ==
On 8 February 2024, the UK government confirmed that more than 100 school buildings containing RAAC would be rebuilt or refurbished. On 21 August, Aberdeen City Council announced that several hundred properties in Aberdeen affected by RAAC would be demolished and rebuilt at a cost of £150m.

== Legacy ==
On 3 January 2024, a BBC News article reported that students at schools affected by RAAC had been forced to change the subjects they were studying at GCSE because they did not have access to facilities such as laboratories or design and technology rooms. The article said that some students were concerned about poor exam results as they had been required to change subjects at the eleventh hour.

On 11 January 2024 York Museums Trust supplied a report to York City Council on the discovery of RAAC in the York Castle Museum. It is one of three museums in the UK with RAAC and the only listed building. YMT reported that the closure to the Castle Museum because of RAAC during 2023 resulted in a loss of earnings of over £400,000 and forced the Trust to use £80,000 from their financial reserves to cover the cost of repairs.

On 2 May 2024, the BBC reported that RAAC built council homes had been sold by the government under the Right to Buy scheme, after the 1995 industry assessment of its hazards, with no warning to the buyers, some even as recently as 2018.

In February 2025, RAAC was discovered at the Dolphin Shopping Centre in Poole.

In April 2026, The Tab reported on the discovery of RAAC panels in April 2024 within the Manchester Metropolitan University library building. The building was closed to students in September 2024 and subsequently demolished, replacing plans to retain the structure as part of an expanded library.

== See also ==
- Concrete cancer
- Reinforced concrete structures durability
