= Basalt fiber =

Structural fibres spun from molten basalt

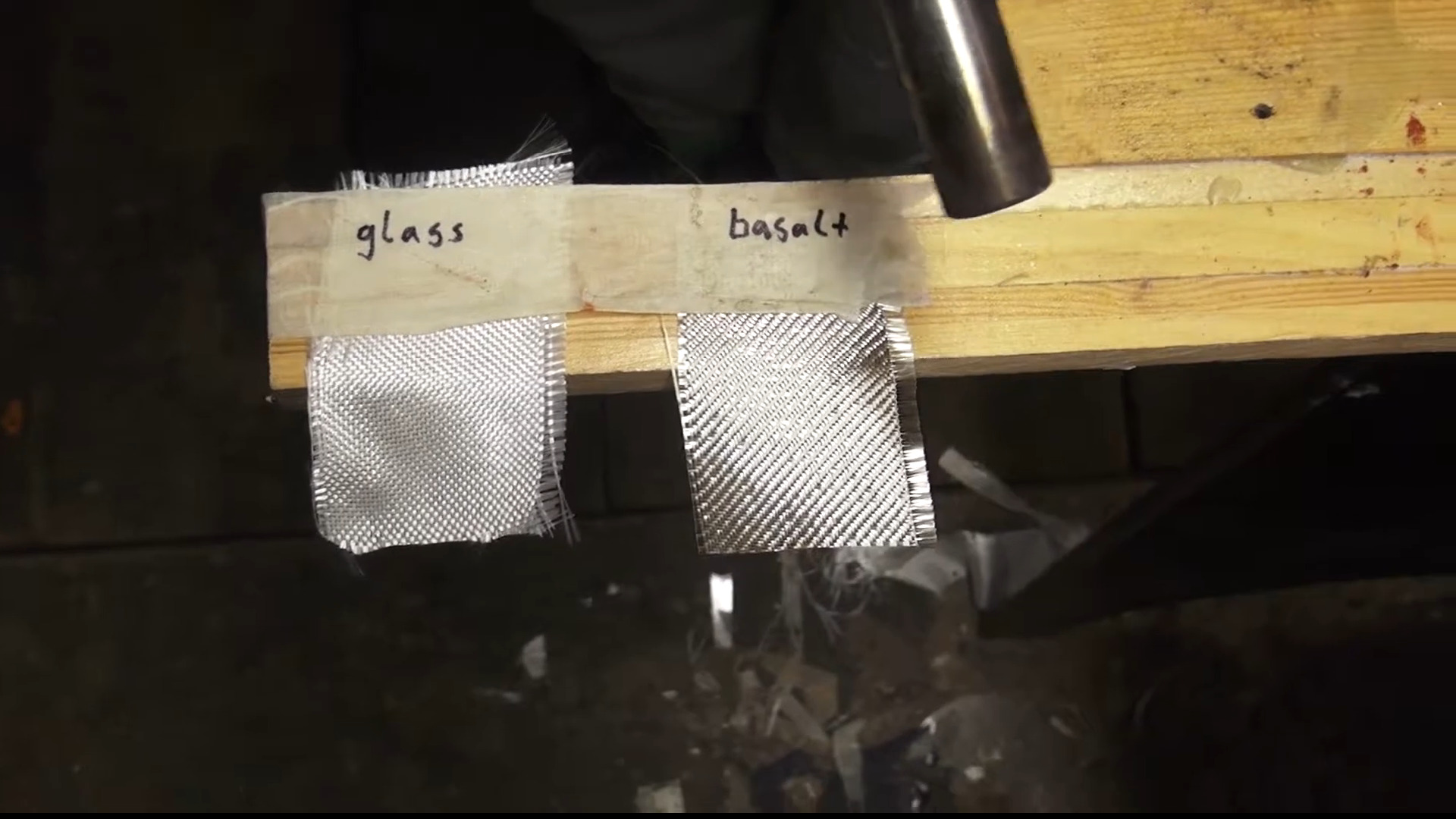
Basalt fiber (right) compared to glass fiber (left)

Basalt fibers are made from basalt by melting it and then turning the melt into fibers. Basalt is an igneous rock formed from magma that cools rapidly, leading to the formation of very small crystals. Three types of basalt fibers can be distinguished:

- Basalt continuous fibers (BCF), used for producing reinforcing materials, composite products, fabrics, and non-woven materials,
- Basalt staple fibers for manufacturing thermal insulation materials, and,
- Basalt superthin fibers (BSTF) for producing high-quality heat- and sound-insulating, fireproof materials.

== Manufacturing process ==
The technology for producing basalt continuous fiber (BCF) is a one-stage process: melting, basalt homogenization, and fiber extraction. Basalt is heated only once. Further processing of BCF into materials is carried out using "cold technologies" with low energy costs.

Basalt fiber is made from a single material, crushed basalt, from a carefully chosen quarry source. Basalt of high acidity (over 46% silica content) and low iron content is considered desirable for fiber production. Unlike with other composites, such as glass fiber, essentially no materials are added during its production. The basalt is washed and then melted.

The manufacture of basalt fiber requires the melting of the crushed and washed basalt rock at about 1,500 °C (2,730 °F). The molten rock is then extruded through small nozzles to produce continuous basalt fiber filaments.

The basalt fibers typically have a filament diameter of between 10 and 20 μm, which is far enough above the respiratory limit of 5 μm to make basalt fiber a suitable replacement for asbestos. They also have a high elastic modulus, resulting in high specific strength—three times that of steel. Thin fiber is usually used for textile applications mainly for production of woven fabric. Thicker fibers are used in filament winding, for example, to produce compressed natural gas (CNG) cylinders or pipes. The thickest fibers are used for pultrusion, geogrid production, unidirectional and multiaxial fabric production, and as chopped strand for concrete reinforcement.

As of 2018, one potential application of continuous basalt fibers was to produce reinforcement bars that could replace traditional carbon-steel rebars, which are susceptible to corrosion in reinforced concrete after pH decreases due to concrete cover carbonation caused by atmospheric CO_{2}. However, such a challenging application would necessarily require the use of low-alkali cement (LAC) when making concrete to prevent the harmful alkali–silica reaction from developing, which could otherwise dissolve at high pH the amorphous silica from basalt fibers, leading to the formation of damaging swelling silicagel that induces tensile stress in high-pH concrete.

== Properties ==
The table refers to the continuous basalt fiber specific producer. Data from all the manufacturers are different, the difference is sometimes very large values.

| Property | Value |
|---|---|
| Tensile strength | 2.8–3.1 GPa (410–450 ksi) |
| Elastic modulus | 85–87 GPa (12,300–12,600 ksi) |
| Elongation at break | 3.15% |
| Density | 2.67 g/cm^{3} (0.096 lb/cu in) |

Comparison:

| Material | Density (g/cm^{3}) | Tensile strength (GPa) | Specific strength | Elastic modulus (GPa) | Specific modulus |
|---|---|---|---|---|---|
| Steel rebar | 7.85 | 0.5 | 0.0637 | 210 | 26.8 |
| A-glass | 2.46 | 2.1 | 0.854 | 69 | 28 |
| C-glass | 2.46 | 2.5 | 1.02 | 69 | 28 |
| E-glass | 2.60 | 2.5 | 0.962 | 76 | 29.2 |
| S-2 glass | 2.49 | 4.83 | 1.94 | 97 | 39 |
| Silicon | 2.16 | 0.206–0.412 | 0.0954–0.191 | | |
| Quartz | 2.2 | 0.3438 | 0.156 | | |
| Carbon fiber (large) | 1.74 | 3.62 | 2.08 | 228 | 131 |
| Carbon fiber (medium) | 1.80 | 5.10 | 2.83 | 241 | 134 |
| Carbon fiber (small) | 1.80 | 6.21 | 3.45 | 297 | 165 |
| Kevlar K-29 | 1.44 | 3.62 | 2.51 | 41.4 | 28.7 |
| Kevlar K-149 | 1.47 | 3.48 | 2.37 | | |
| Polypropylene | 0.91 | 0.27–0.65 | 0.297–0.714 | 38 | 41.8 |
| Polyacrylonitrile | 1.18 | 0.50–0.91 | 0.424–0.771 | 75 | 63.6 |
| Basalt fiber | 2.65 | 2.9–3.1 | 1.09–1.17 | 85–87 | 32.1–32.8 |

| Material type | Elastic modulus (E) | Yield stress (fy) | Tensile strength (fu) |
|---|---|---|---|
| 13-mm-diameter steel bars | 200 GPa (29,000 ksi) | 375 MPa (54.4 ksi) | 560 MPa (81 ksi) |
| 10-mm-diameter steel bars | 200 GPa (29,000 ksi) | 360 MPa (52 ksi) | 550 MPa (80 ksi) |
| 6-mm-diameter steel bars | 200 GPa (29,000 ksi) | 400 MPa (58 ksi) | 625 MPa (90.6 ksi) |
| 10-mm-diameter BFRP bars | 48.1 GPa (6,980 ksi) | - | 1,113 MPa (161.4 ksi) |
| 6-mm-diameter BFRP bars | 47.5 GPa (6,890 ksi) | - | 1,345 MPa (195.1 ksi) |
| BFRP sheet | 91 GPa (13,200 ksi) | - | 2,100 MPa (300 ksi) |

== History ==
The first attempts to produce basalt fiber were made in the United States in 1923 by Paul Dhe who was granted U.S. patent 1,462,446. These were further developed after World War II by researchers in the US, Europe and the Soviet Union especially for military and aerospace applications. Since declassification in 1995 basalt fibers have been used in a wider range of civilian applications.

=== Schools ===
1. RWTH Aachen University. Every two year RWTH Aachen University's Institut für Textiltechnik hosts the International Glass Fibers Symposium where basalt fiber is devoted a separate section. The university conducts regular research to study and improve basalt fiber properties. Textile concrete is also more corrosion-resistant and more malleable than conventional concrete. Replacement of carbon fibers with basalt fibers can significantly enhance the application fields of the innovative composite material that is textile concrete, says Andreas Koch.
2. The Institute for Lightweight Design Materials Science at the University of Hannover
3. The German Plastics Institute (DKI) in Darmstadt
4. The Technical University of Dresden had contributed in the studying of basalt fibers. Textile reinforcements in concrete construction - basic research and applications. The Peter Offermann covers the range from the beginning of fundamental research work at the TU Dresden in the early 90s to the present. The idea that textile lattice structures made of high-performance threads for constructional reinforcement could open up completely new possibilities in construction was the starting point for today's large research network. Textile reinforcements in concrete construction - basic research and applications. As a novelty, parallel applications to the research with the required approvals in individual cases, such as the world's first textile reinforced concrete bridges and the upgrading of shell structures with the thinnest layers of textile concrete, are reported.
5. University of Applied Sciences Regensburg, Department of Mechanical Engineering. Mechanical characterization of basalt fibre reinforced plastic with different fabric reinforcements – Tensile tests and FE-calculations with representative volume elements (RVEs). Marco Romano, Ingo Ehrlich.

== Uses ==
- Heat protection
- Friction materials
- Windmill blades
- Lamp posts
- Ship hulls
- Car bodies
- Sports equipment
- Speaker cones
- Cavity wall ties
- Rebar for concrete
- Load-bearing profiles
- CNG cylinders and pipes
- Absorbent for oil spills
- Chopped strand for concrete reinforcement
- High-pressure vessels (e.g., tanks and gas cylinders)
- Pultruded rebar for concrete reinforcement (e.g., for bridges and buildings)
- Corrosion & radiation resistant cloth

== Design codes ==
=== Russia ===
Since October 18, 2017, JV 297.1325800.2017 "Fibreconcrete constructions with nonmetallic fiber has been put into operation. Design rules, "which eliminated the legal vacuum in the design of basalt reinforced fiber reinforced concrete. According to paragraph 1.1. the standard extends to all types of non-metallic fibers (polymers, polypropylene, glass, basalt and carbon). When comparing different fibers, it can be noted that polymer fibers are inferior to mineral strengths, but their use makes it possible to improve the characteristics of building composites.

== See also ==
- Pele's hair
- Mineral wool
- Glass wool
- Beta cloth

== Bibliography ==
- Lauterborn, E., "Dokumentation Ultraschalluntersuchung Eingangsprüfung", Internal Report wiweb Erding, Erding, October (2011).
- Moser, K., "Faser-Kunststoff-Verbund – Entwurfs- und Berechnungsgrundlagen". VDI-Verlag, Düsseldorf (1992).
- Naik, N.K., "Woven Fabric Composites". Technomic Publishing Co., Lancaster (PA) (1994).
- Bericht 2004-1535 – Prüfung eines Sitzes nach BS 5852:1990, Section 5 – ignition source crib 7, für die Fa. Franz Kiel GmbH & Co. KG. Siemens AG, A&D SP, Frankfurt am Main (2004).
- DIN EN 2559 – Luft- und Raumfahrt – Kohlenstoffaser-Prepregs – Bestimmung des Harz- und Fasermasseanteils und der flächenbezogenen Fasermasse. Normenstelle Luftfahrt (NL) im DIN Deutsches Institut für Normung e.V., Beuth Verlag, Berlin (1997).
- Epoxidharz L, Härter L – Technische Daten. Technical Data Sheet by R&G (2011).
- Quality Certificates for Fabrics and Rovings. Incotelogy Ltd., Bonn, January (2012).
- Nolf, Jean Marie (2003). "Basalt Fibres-Fire Blocking Textiles". Technical Usage Textile. 49 (3): 38–42.
- Ozgen, Banu; Gong, Hugh (May 2011). "Yarn geometry in woven fabrics". Textile Research Journal. 81 (7): 738–745. doi:10.1177/0040517510388550. S2CID 138546738.
- Papula, L., "Mathematische Formelsammlung für Naturwissenschaftler und Ingenieure". 10. Auflage, Vieweg+Teubner, Wiesbaden (2009).
- Saravanan, D. (2006). "Spinning the rocks-basalt fibres". IE (I) Journal-TX. 86: 39–45.
- Schmid, Vinzent; Jungbauer, Bastian; Romano, Marco; Ehrlich, Ingo; Gebbeken, Norbert (June 2012). The influence of different types of fabrics on the fibre volume content and porosity in basalt fibre reinforced plastics. Applied Research Conference. pp. 162–165.
- Osnos, S., Osnos, M. (2021). "BCF: Developing industrial production for reinforcement materials and composites". JEC Composites Magazine, N° 139, 19–24.
- Osnos, S., Rozhkov, I. (2022). "Application of basalt rock-based materials in the automotive industry". JEC Composites Magazine, N° 147, 33–36.
