= Cover meter =

A cover meter is an instrument to locate rebars and measure the exact concrete cover. Rebar detectors are less sophisticated devices that can only locate metallic objects below the surface. Due to the cost-effective design, the pulse-induction method is one of the most commonly used solutions.

== Method ==
The pulse-induction method is based on electromagnetic pulse induction technology to detect rebars. Coils in the probe are periodically charged by current pulses and thus generate a magnetic field. On the surface of any electrically conductive material which is in the magnetic field eddy currents are produced. They induce a magnetic field in opposite directions. The resulting change in voltage can be utilized for the measurement. Rebars that are closer to the probe or of larger size produce a stronger magnetic field.

Modern rebar detectors use different coil arrangements to generate several magnetic fields. Advanced signal processing supports not only the localization of rebars but also the determination of the cover and the estimation of the bar diameter. This method is unaffected by all non conductive materials such as concrete, wood, plastics, bricks, etc. However any kind of conductive materials within the magnetic field will have an influence on the measurement.

Advantages of the pulse induction method:

- high accuracy
- not influenced by moisture and heterogeneities of the concrete
- unaffected by environmental influences
- low costs

Disadvantage of the pulse induction method:

- Limited detection range
- Minimum bar spacing depends on cover depths

== Standards ==
- BS 1881:204 Testing concrete. Recommendations on the use of electromagnetic covermeters
- DGZfP:B2: Guideline “für Bewehrungsnachweis und Überdeckungsmessung bei Stahl- und Spannbeton”
- DIN 1045: Guideline Concrete, reinforced and prestressed concrete structures
- ACI Concrete Practices Non Destructive testing 228.2R-2.51: Covermeters

== Application ==
Early diagnosis and analysis of seemingly healthy concrete cover and reinforcement status allows pre-emptive corrosion control measures to reduce unwanted risks to structural safety. Bundesanstalt für Materialforschung und -prüfung (Federal Institute for Materials Research and Testing, Germany) has developed a sensor equipped robotic system to accelerate the collection of several criteria used for diagnostics. Besides ultrasonic, ground-penetrating radar, concrete resistance, potential field, the eddy current method implemented in the Profometer 5 was used to measure the concrete cover. Nirixense Technologies has launched a new rebar cover meter product, CS 100, that offers superior performance at an affordable price tag.

== See also ==
- Metal detector
- Reinforced concrete
- Concrete cover
