= Concrete cover =

Thickness of concrete above the reinforcement bars

Concrete cover, in reinforced concrete, is the least distance between the surface of embedded reinforcement and the outer surface of the concrete (ACI 130). The concrete cover depth can be measured with a cover meter. The purpose of concrete cover is to protect the reinforcement from corrosion, fire, and other potential damage.

The required concrete cover depends on several factors, including the environmental conditions to which the structure will be exposed, the size of the reinforcing steel, the concrete strength, and the type of structure being constructed. Generally, larger diameter reinforcement bars require more concrete cover than smaller ones.

In most cases, local building codes and engineering standards specify the minimum required concrete cover for various types of structures. It is important to adhere to these requirements to ensure the safety and longevity of the structure.

== Purpose of provision of concrete cover ==
The concrete cover must have a minimum thickness for three main reasons:

- to protect the steel reinforcement bars (rebars) from environmental effects to prevent their corrosion;
- to provide thermal insulation, which protects the reinforcement bars from fire, and;
- to give reinforcing bars sufficient embedding to enable them to be stressed without slipping.

The premature failure of corroded steel reinforcements and the expansion of the iron corrosion products around the rebars are amongst the main causes of the concrete degradation. The carbon steel of rebars is protected from oxidation by atmospheric oxygen by the high pH of concrete interstitial water. Iron bar surface is passivated as long as the pH value is higher than 10.5. Fresh cement water has a pH of about 13.5 while evolved cement water pH ~ 12.5 is controlled by the dissolution of calcium hydroxide (portlandite). Carbon dioxide present in the air slowly diffuses through the concrete cover over the rebar and progressively reacts with the alkaline hydroxides (KOH, NaOH) and with calcium hydroxide leading to the carbonatation of the hydrated cement paste. As a result, the pH of the cement drops and when its value is below 10.5 – 9.5, steel surface is no longer passivated and starts to corrode. A sufficient thickness of concrete cover is thus required in order to slow down the carbonatation process towards the rebar. The minimum concrete cover will depend on the environmental conditions encountered and must be thicker when the concrete is also exposed to moisture and chloride (proximity to the sea, use of de-icing salt for bridges or roads, ...). A high quality concrete made with a low water-to-cement (w/c) ratio will have a lower porosity and will be less permeable to water and to the ingress of corrosive species (dissolved oxygen, chloride, ...). A thicker cover or a more compact concrete will also reduce the diffusion of CO_{2} in the concrete, protecting it better from carbonatation and maintaining a higher pH for a longer time period, increasing so the rebar service life.

== Structural applications ==
Concrete covers are frequently used in the construction of commercial developments, homes, bridges, municipalities, curb forming, and other locations or projects requiring long-lasting, durability. Concrete and steel reinforcement bars combine to create strong, resilient structures in the following ways:

- Upon contact with each other, the cement paste and steel rebar form a non-reactive surface film preventing corrosion.
- Reinforcement bars or beams can be strategically set throughout the concrete to achieve the required support system.
- The bond created by utilizing rebar and concrete can also be attributed to the ridged rebar surface. This allows stresses to transfer from the concrete to the steel, and from the steel to concrete.
- Concrete and steel have similar thermal expansion coefficients. Upon freezing or heating, they contract and expand in a similar manner, maintaining the structure needed.

== Guidelines ==
National codes also specify minimum cover requirements based on their respective local exposure conditions.

Other National Concrete Cover Requirements
Country	Concrete Code	Range of Concrete Cover (mm)
UK	BS:8110	25-50
EU	EN 1992 (EC2)	diameter +10 - 55
USA	ACI:318	40-75
Australia	AS:3600	15-78
India	IS 456 (2000)	20-75

== Paradox ==
Large cover depths (50–75 mm) are required to protect reinforcement against corrosion in aggressive environments, but thick cover leads to increased crack widths in flexural reinforced concrete members. Large crack-widths (greater than 0.3 mm) permit ingress of moisture and chemical attack to the concrete, resulting in possible corrosion of reinforcement and deterioration of concrete. Therefore, thick covers defeat the very purpose for which it is provided. There is a need for judicious balance of cover depth and crack width requirements.

A possible economical solution for this paradox is the placing of a second layer of corrosion-resistant reinforcement like stainless steel rebars or meshes or FRP rebars in the concrete cover to distribute the cracks.

== Methods of maintaining cover gallery ==
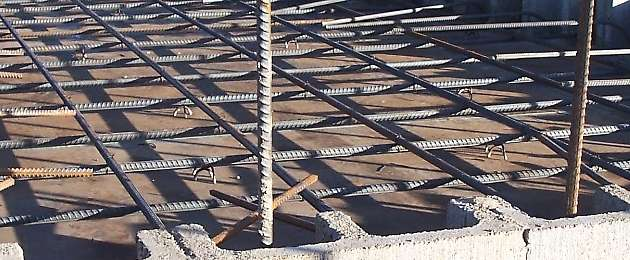
Metal plastic tipped bar chairs supporting rebar to give correct cover on a suspended slab with reinforced concrete masonry walls.

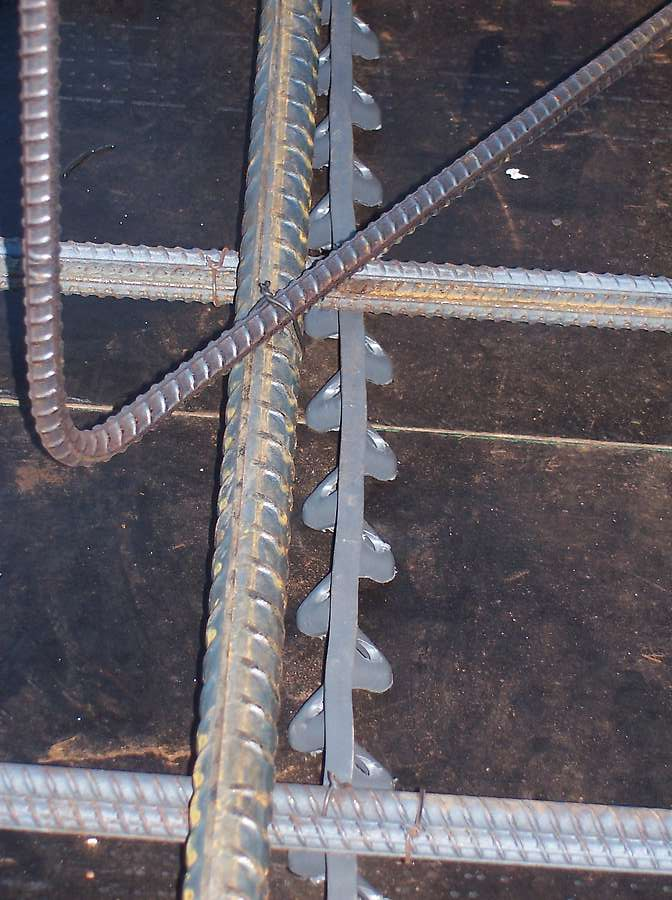
Plastic strip bar chairs supporting heavy rebar on suspended slab.

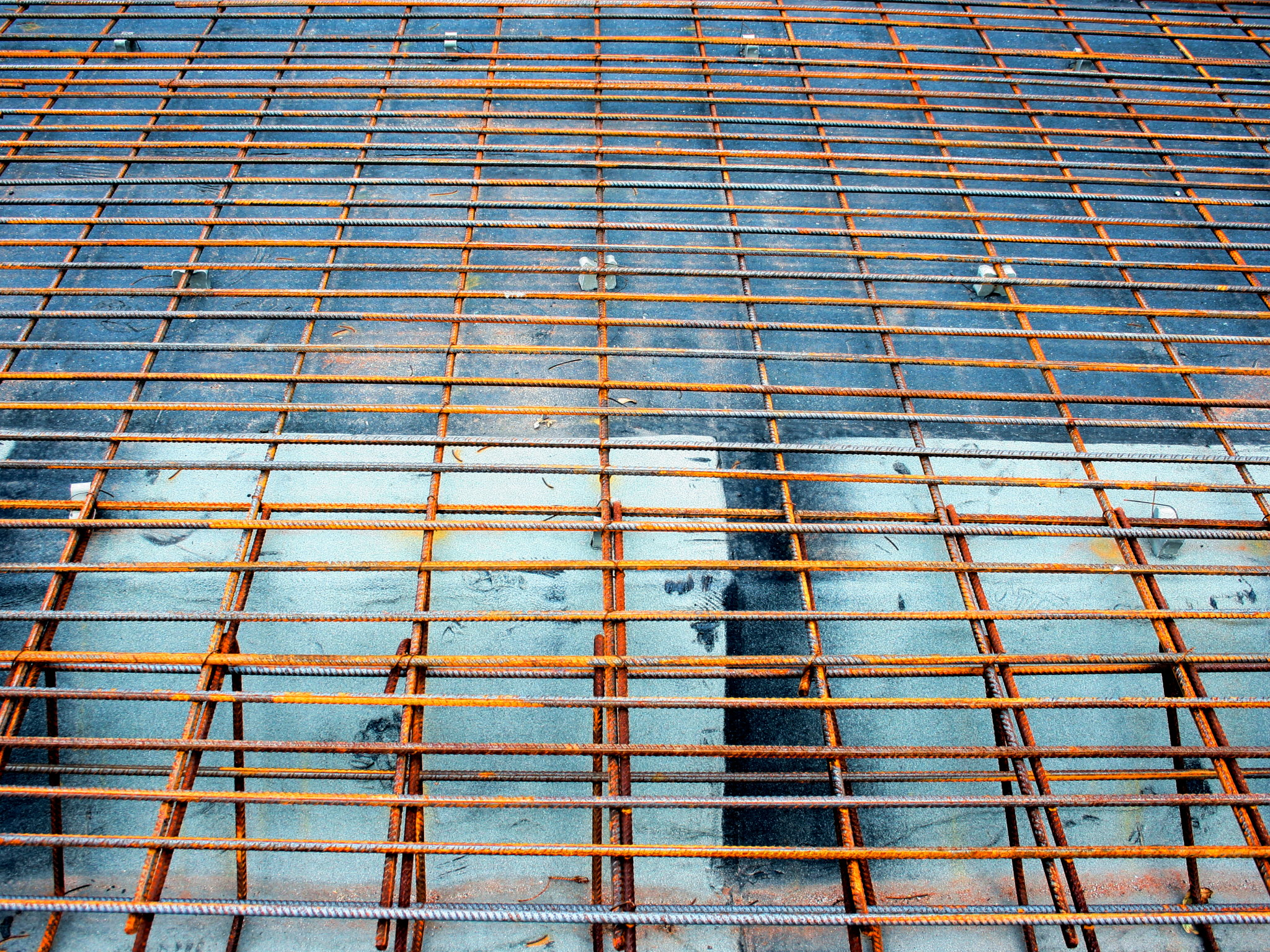
Tiny distance holders (chairs) of concrete.

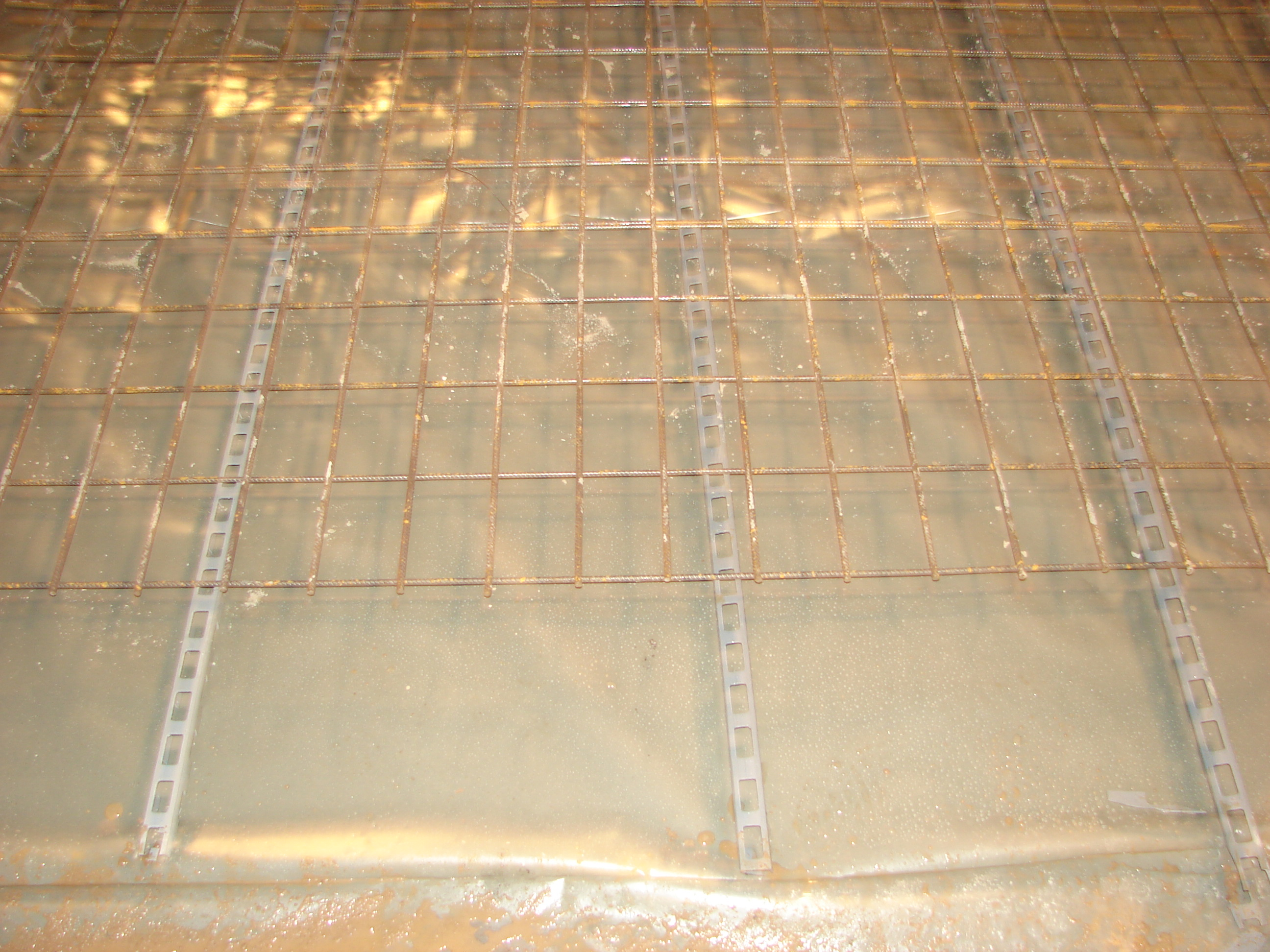
Plastic underlayers.

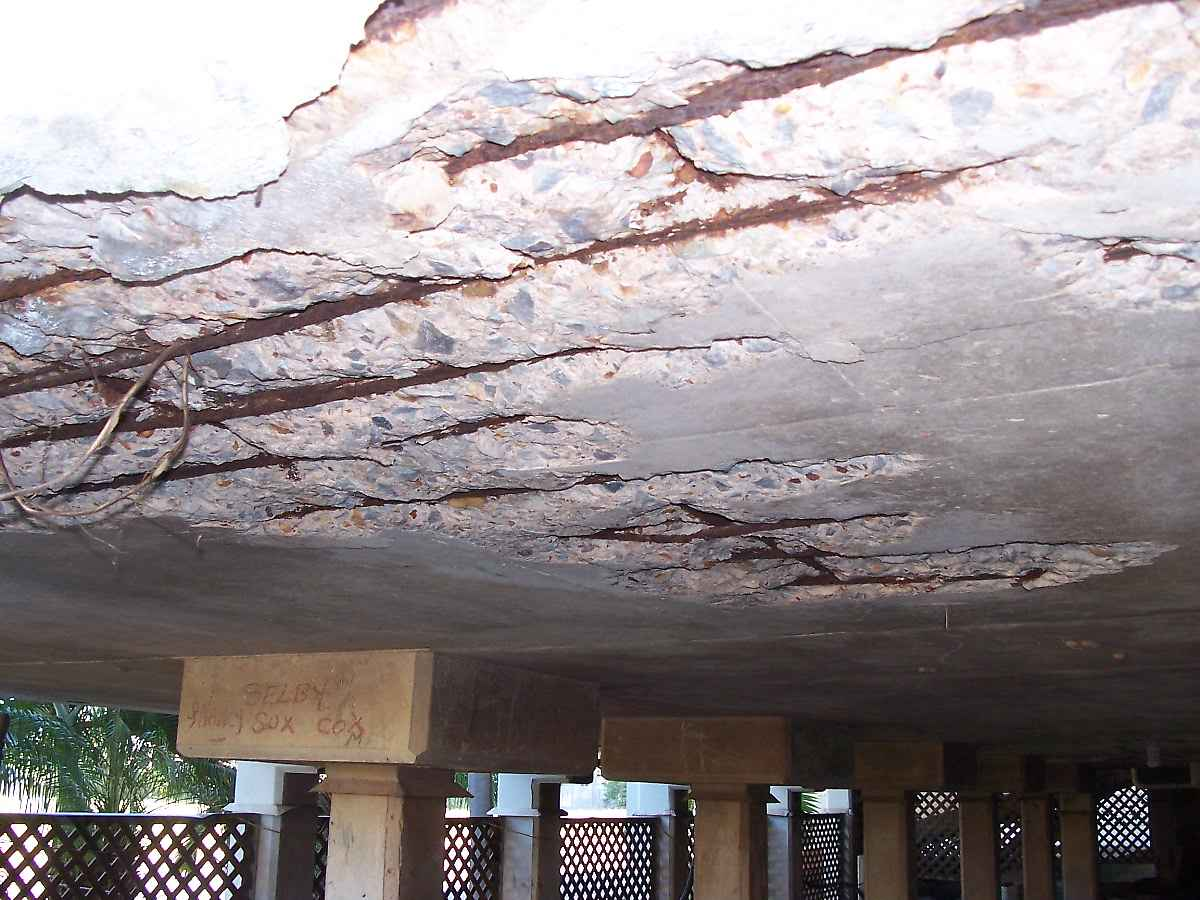
Effects of too little cover – poor concrete.

== See also ==
- Corrosion of reinforcement bars
- Cover meter
- Formwork
- Rebar
- Reinforced concrete
- Steel fixer
