= Durability of reinforced concrete structures =

The durability design of reinforced concrete structures has been recently introduced in national and international regulations. It is required that structures are designed to preserve their characteristics during the service life, avoiding premature failure and the need of extraordinary maintenance and restoration works. Considerable efforts have therefore made in the last decades in order to define useful models describing the degradation processes affecting reinforced concrete structures, to be used during the design stage in order to assess the material characteristics and the structural layout of the structure.. {{concrete Structures, properly designed and constructed, are long lasting and should require little maintenance. The durability of the concrete is influenced by 1- the exposure conditions; 2- the cement type; 3- the concrete quality; 4- cover to the reinforcement; 5- the width of any cracks.}}

== Service life of a reinforced concrete structure ==
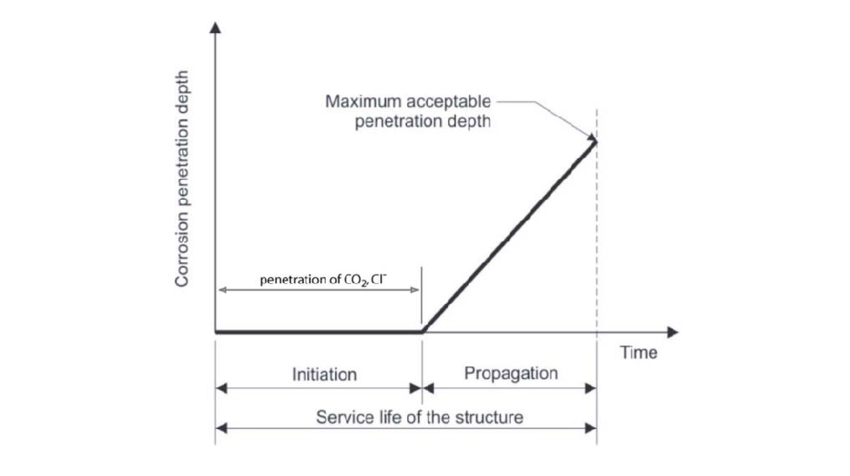
Initiation and propagation periods of steel rebar corrosion in a reinforced concrete structure (Tutti diagram).

Initially, the chemical reactions that normally occur in the cement paste, generate an alkaline environment, bringing the solution in the cement paste pores to pH values around 13. In these conditions, passivation of steel rebar occurs, due to a spontaneous generation of a thin film of oxides able to protect the steel from corrosion. Over time, the thin film can be damaged, and corrosion of steel rebar starts. The corrosion of steel rebar is one of the main causes of premature failure of reinforced concrete structures worldwide, mainly as a consequence of two degradation processes, carbonation and penetration of chlorides. With regard to the corrosion degradation process, a simple and accredited model for the assessment of the service life is the one proposed by Tuutti, in 1982. According to this model, the service life of a reinforced concrete structure can be divided into two distinct phases.

- $t_{i}$, initiation time: from the moment the structure is built, to the moment corrosion initiates on steel rebar. More in particular, it is the time required for aggressive agents (carbon dioxide and chlorides) to penetrate the concrete cover thickness, reach the embedded steel rebar, alter the initial passivation condition on steel surface and cause corrosion initiation.
- $t_{p}$, propagation time: which is defined as the time from the onset of active corrosion until an ultimate limit state is reached, i.e. corrosion propagation reaches a limit value corresponding to unacceptable structural damage, such as cracking and detachment of the concrete cover thickness.

The identification of initiation time and propagation time is useful to further identify the main variables and processes influencing the service life of the structure which are specific of each service life phase and of the degradation process considered.

=== Carbonation-induced corrosion ===
The initiation time is related to the rate at which carbonation propagates in the concrete cover thickness. Once that carbonation reaches the steel surface, altering the local pH value of the environment, the protective thin film of oxides on the steel surface becomes instable, and corrosion initiates involving an extended portion of the steel surface. One of the most simplified and accredited models describing the propagation of carbonation in time is to consider penetration depth proportional to the square root of time, following the correlation

$x=K \sqrt{t}$

where $x$ is the carbonation depth, $t$ is time, and $K$ is the carbonation coefficient. The corrosion onset takes place when the carbonation depth reaches the concrete cover thickness, and therefore can be evaluated as

$t_{i}=\left( \frac{c}{K} \right)^2$

where $c$ is the concrete cover thickness.

$K$ is the key design parameter to assess initiation time in the case of carbonation-induced corrosion. It is expressed in mm/year^{1/2} and depends on the characteristics of concrete and the exposure conditions. The penetration of gaseous CO_{2} in a porous medium such as concrete occurs via diffusion. The humidity content of concrete is one of the main influencing factors of CO_{2} diffusion in concrete. If concrete pores are completely and permanently saturated (for instance in submerged structures) CO_{2} diffusion is prevented. On the other hand, for completely dry concrete, the chemical reaction of carbonation cannot occur. Another influencing factor for CO_{2} diffusion rate is concrete porosity. Concrete obtained with higher w/c ratio or obtained with an incorrect curing process presents higher porosity at hardened state, and is therefore subjected to a higher carbonation rate. The influencing factors concerning the exposure conditions are the environmental temperature, humidity and concentration of CO_{2}. Carbonation rate is higher for environments with higher humidity and temperature, and increases in polluted environments such as urban centres and inside close spaces as tunnels.

To evaluate propagation time in the case of carbonation-induced corrosion, several models have been proposed. In a simplified but commonly accepted method, the propagation time is evaluated as function of the corrosion propagation rate. If the corrosion rate is considered constant, t_{p} can be estimated as:

$t_{p}= \frac{p_{lim}}{v_{corr}}$

where $p_{lim}$ is the limit corrosion penetration in steel and $v_{corr}$ is the corrosion propagation rate. $p_{lim}$ must be defined in function of the limit state considered. Generally for carbonation-induced corrosion the concrete cover cracking is considered as limit state, and in this case a $p_{lim}$ equal to 100 μm is considered. $v_{corr}$ depends on the environmental factors in proximity of the corrosion process, such as the availability of oxygen and water at concrete cover depth. Oxygen is generally available at the steel surface, except for submerged structures. If pores are constantly fully saturated, a very low amount of oxygen reaches the steel surface and corrosion rate can be considered negligible. For very dry concretes $v_{corr}$ is negligible due to the absence of water which prevents the chemical reaction of corrosion. For intermediate concrete humidity content, corrosion rate increases with increasing the concrete humidity content. Since the humidity content in a concrete can significantly vary along the year, it is general not possible to define a constant $v_{corr}$. One possible approach is to consider a mean annual value of $v_{corr}$.

=== Chloride-induced corrosion ===
The presence of chlorides to the steel surface, above a certain critical amount, can locally break the protective thin film of oxides on the steel surface, even if concrete is still alkaline, causing a very localized and aggressive form of corrosion known as pitting. Current regulations forbid the use of chloride contaminated raw materials, therefore one factor influencing the initiation time is chloride penetration rate from the environment. This is a complex task, because chloride solutions penetrate in concrete through the combination of several transport phenomena, such as diffusion, capillary effect and hydrostatic pressure. Chloride binding is another phenomenon affecting the kinetic of chloride penetration. Part of the total chloride ions can be absorbed or can chemically react with some constituents of the cement paste, leading to a reduction of chlorides in the pore solution (free chlorides that are steel able to penetrate in concrete). The ability of a concrete to chloride binding is related to the cement type, being higher for blended cements containing silica fume, fly ash or furnace slag.

Being the modelling of chloride penetration in concrete particularly complex, a simplified correlation is generally adopted, which was firstly proposed by Collepardi in 1972

$C(x,t)=C_{s}\left[1- \mathrm{erf} \left( \frac{x}{2\sqrt{Dt}}\right) \right]$

Where $C_{s}$ is the chloride concentration at the exposed surface, x is the chloride penetration depth, D is the chloride diffusion coefficient, and t is time.

This equation is a solution of Fick's II law of diffusion in the hypothesis that chloride initial content is zero, that $C_{s}$ is constant in time on the whole surface, and D is constant in time and through the concrete cover. With $C_{s}$ and D known, the equation can be used to evaluate the temporal evolution of the chloride concentration profile in the concrete cover and evaluate the initiation time as the moment in which critical chloride threshold ($C_{cl}$) is reached at the depth of steel rebar.

However, there are many critical issues related to the practical use of this model. For existing reinforced concrete structures in chloride-bearing environment $C_{s}$ and D can be identified calculating the best-fit curve for measured chloride concertation profiles. From concrete samples retrieved on field is therefore possible to define the values of C_{s} and D for residual service life evaluation. On the other hand, for new structures it is more complicated to define $C_{s}$ and D. These parameters depend on the exposure conditions, the properties of concrete such as porosity (and therefore w/c ratio and curing process) and type of cement used. Furthermore, for the evaluation of long-term behaviour of structure, a critical issue is related to the fact that $C_{s}$ and D can not be considered constant in time, and that the transport penetration of chlorides can be considered as pure diffusion only for submerged structures. A further issue is the assessment of $C_{cl}$. There are various influencing factors, such as are the potential of steel rebar and the pH of the solution included in concrete pores. Moreover, pitting corrosion initiation is a phenomenon with a stochastic nature, therefore also $C_{cl}$ can be defined only on statistical basis.

== Corrosion prevention ==
The durability assessment has been implemented in European design codes at the beginning of the 90s. It is required for designers to include the effects of long-term corrosion of steel rebar during the design stage, in order to avoid unacceptable damages during the service life of the structure. Different approaches are then available for the durability design.

=== Standard approach ===
It is the standardized method to deal with durability, also known as deem-to-satisfy approach, and provided by current european regulation EN 206. It is required that the designer identifies the environmental exposure conditions and the expected degradation process, assessing the correct exposure class. Once this is defined, design code gives standard prescriptions for w/c ratio, the cement content, and the thickness of the concrete cover.

This approach represents an improvement step for the durability design of reinforced concrete structures, it is suitable for the design of ordinary structures designed with traditional materials (Portland cement, carbon steel rebar) and with an expected service life of 50 years. Nevertheless, it is considered not completely exhaustive in some cases. The simple prescriptions do not allow to optimize the design for different parts of the structures with different local exposure conditions. Furthermore, they do not allow to consider the effects on service life of special measures such as the use of additional protections.

=== Performance-based approach ===
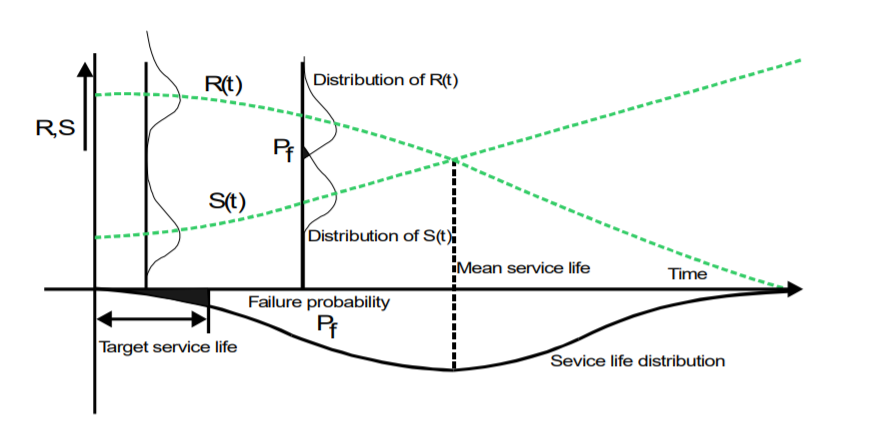
Figure 2 - Failure probability and target service life in performance-based service life models for reinforced concrete structures

Performance-based approaches provide for a real design of durability, based on models describing the evolution in time of degradation processes, and the definition of times at which defined limit states will be reached. To consider the wide variety of service life influencing factors and their variability, performance-based approaches address the problem from a probabilistic or semiprobabilistic point of view.

The performance-based service life model proposed by the European project DuraCrete, and by FIB Model Code for Service Life Design, is based on a probabilistic approach, similar to the one adopted for structural design. Environmental factors are considered as loads S(t), while material properties such as chloride penetration resistance are considered as resistances R(t) as shown in Figure 2. For each degradation process, design equations are set to evaluate the probability of failure of predefined performances of the structure, where acceptable probability is selected on the basis of the limit state considered. The degradation processes are still described with the models previously defined for carbonation-induced and chloride-induced corrosion, but to reflect the statistical nature of the problem, the variables are considered as probability distribution curves over time. To assess some of the durability design parameters, the use of accelerated laboratory test is suggested, such as the so called Rapid Chloride Migration Test to evaluate chloride penetration resistance of concrete '. Through the application of corrective parameters, the long-term behaviour of the structure in real exposure conditions may be evaluated.

The use of probabilistic service life models allows to implement a real durability design that could be implemented in the design stage of structures. This approach is of particular interest when an extended service life is required (>50 years) or when the environmental exposure conditions are particularly aggressive. Anyway, the applicability of this kind of models is still limited. The main critical issues still concern, for instance, the individuation of accelerated laboratory tests able to characterize concrete performances, reliable corrective factors to be used for the evaluation of long-term durability performances and the validation of these models based on real long-term durability performances.

== See also ==
- Concrete
- Concrete degradation
- Reinforced concrete
